= Wangenheim Palace =

Building in Hanover, Germany

- Wangenheimpalais
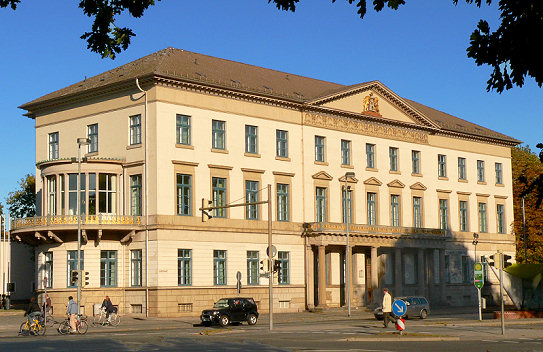
- Interactive map of the Wangenheim Palace area

General information
- Location: Hanover, Germany
- Coordinates: 52°22′9″N 9°44′5″E
- Construction started: 1829; 197 years ago

Wangenheim Palace (German: Wangenheimpalais) is a building in the Mitte district of Hanover, the capital of Lower Saxony, Germany. From 1863 to 1913, it was the town hall and seat of the city's administration. Today it is the seat of the Lower Saxon Ministry of Economic Affairs.

== History ==
The palace was built in the years 1829–1832 to plans by the Hanoverian court builder Georg Ludwig Friedrich Laves. Georg Moller is believed to have had an advisory role in the design of the building. Georg Christian von Wangenheim commissioned the construction of building and used it as a residence until his death. A winter garden was also added to the building by Laves in 1844.

In 1851, George V of Hanover ascended the throne. Subsequently, the building was acquired by the crown and made into a residence palace. George V lived in the palace for a period of ten years.

In 1862, the building was acquired by the City of Hanover, which hired Ludwig Droste to oversee a reconstruction project for the building. The following year, the city administration left the Old Town Hall and moved into the palace. It was used as the town hall and seat of the city administration until 1913, when the town hall moved into the newly created New Town Hall diagonally opposite from the palace.

During the Second World War, the palace was destroyed in one of the air raids on Hanover in 1943. It burned down, but was rebuilt a few years later and used for city purposes. After the demolition of the old Brückmühle water mill, which had been in use since the Middle Ages, the city coat of arms from the mill was installed in the gable of the facade of the Wangenheim Palace.

The Lower Saxon Ministry of Economic Affairs has used the palace as its headquarters since 1957. From 1994 to 2013, there was a bus stop opposite the palace designed by Italian designer Massimo Iosa Ghini in the shape of a sailboat, which was a part of the BUSSTOPS art project. This was moved to the opposite side of the street in front of the August Kestner Museum in 2013.

== Gallery ==
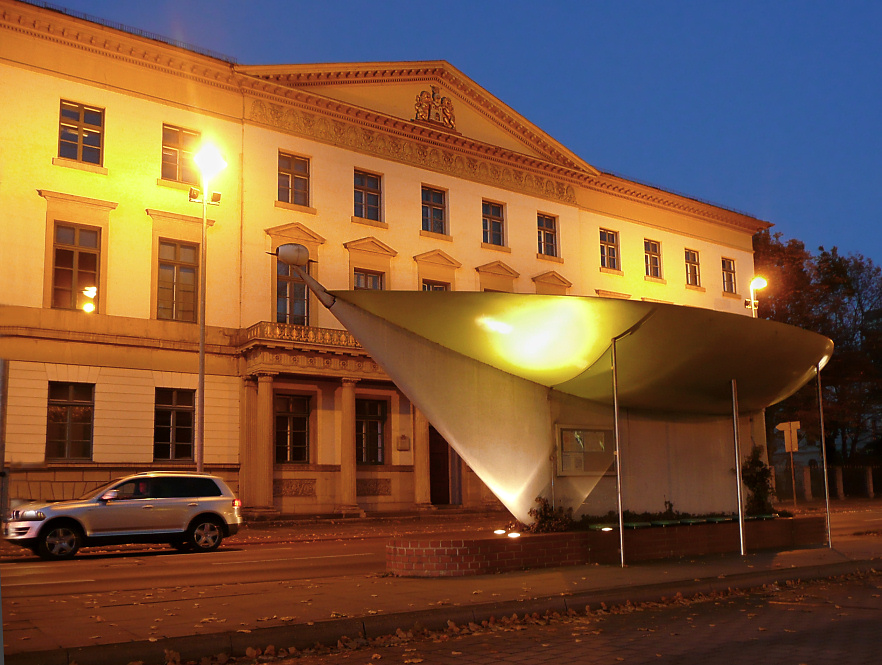
Wangenheim Palace at night with bus stop from the art project BUSSTOPS in front of the palace.

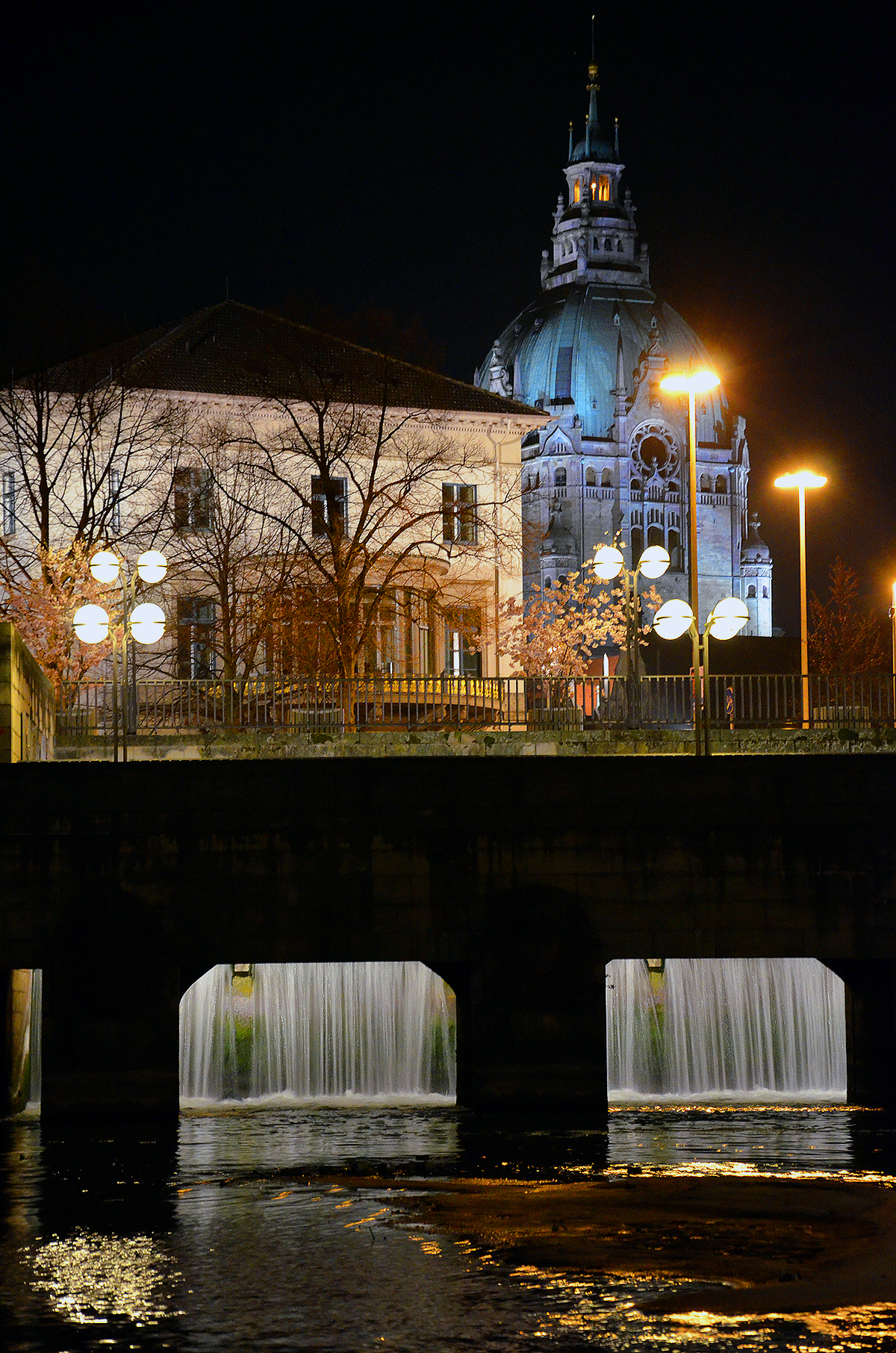
The palace at night in the spring, seen from the banks of the Leine at the Leineschloss.

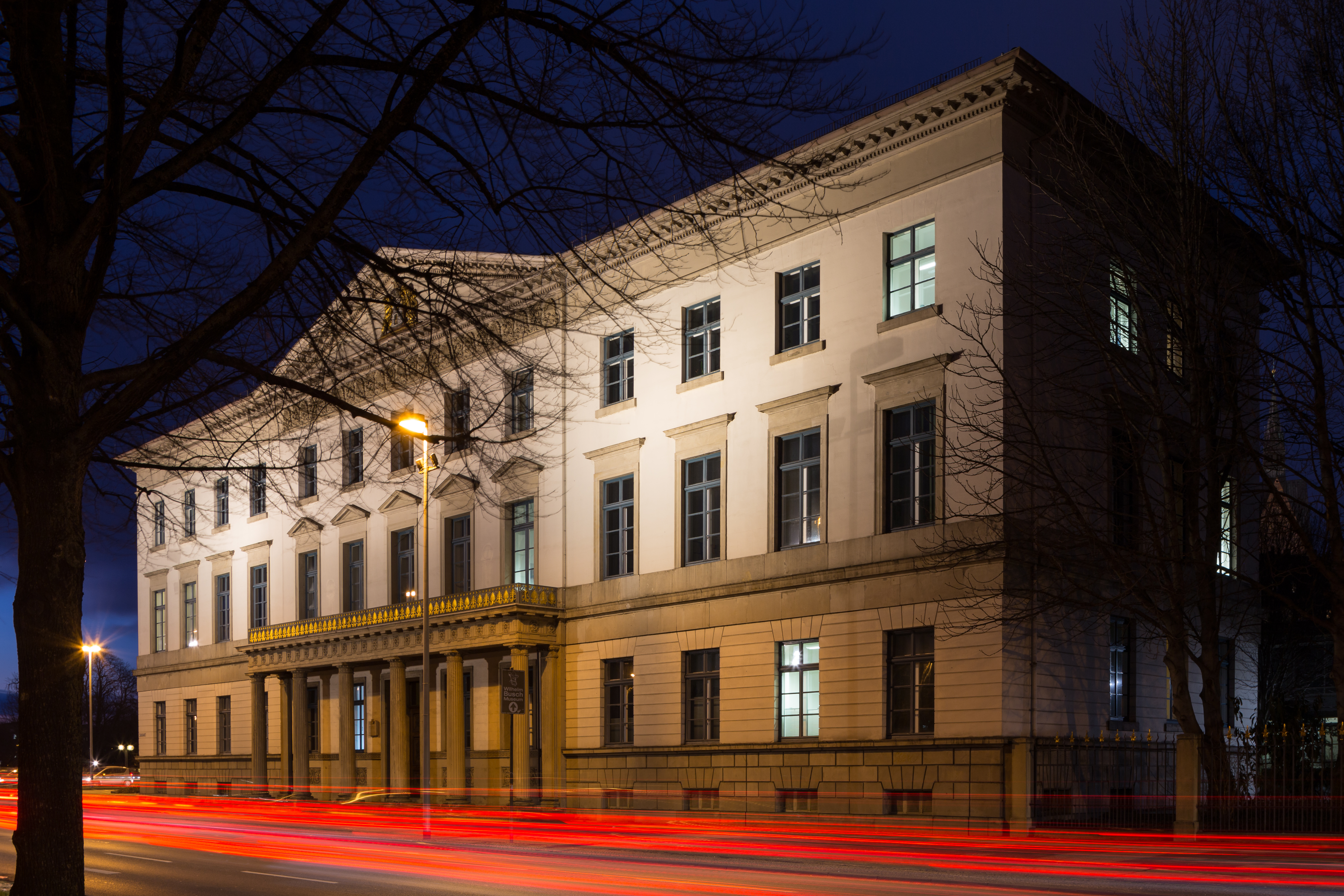
The palace at night.
