= Old Town Hall (Hanover) =

Former town hall in Hanover, Germany

- Altes Rathaus
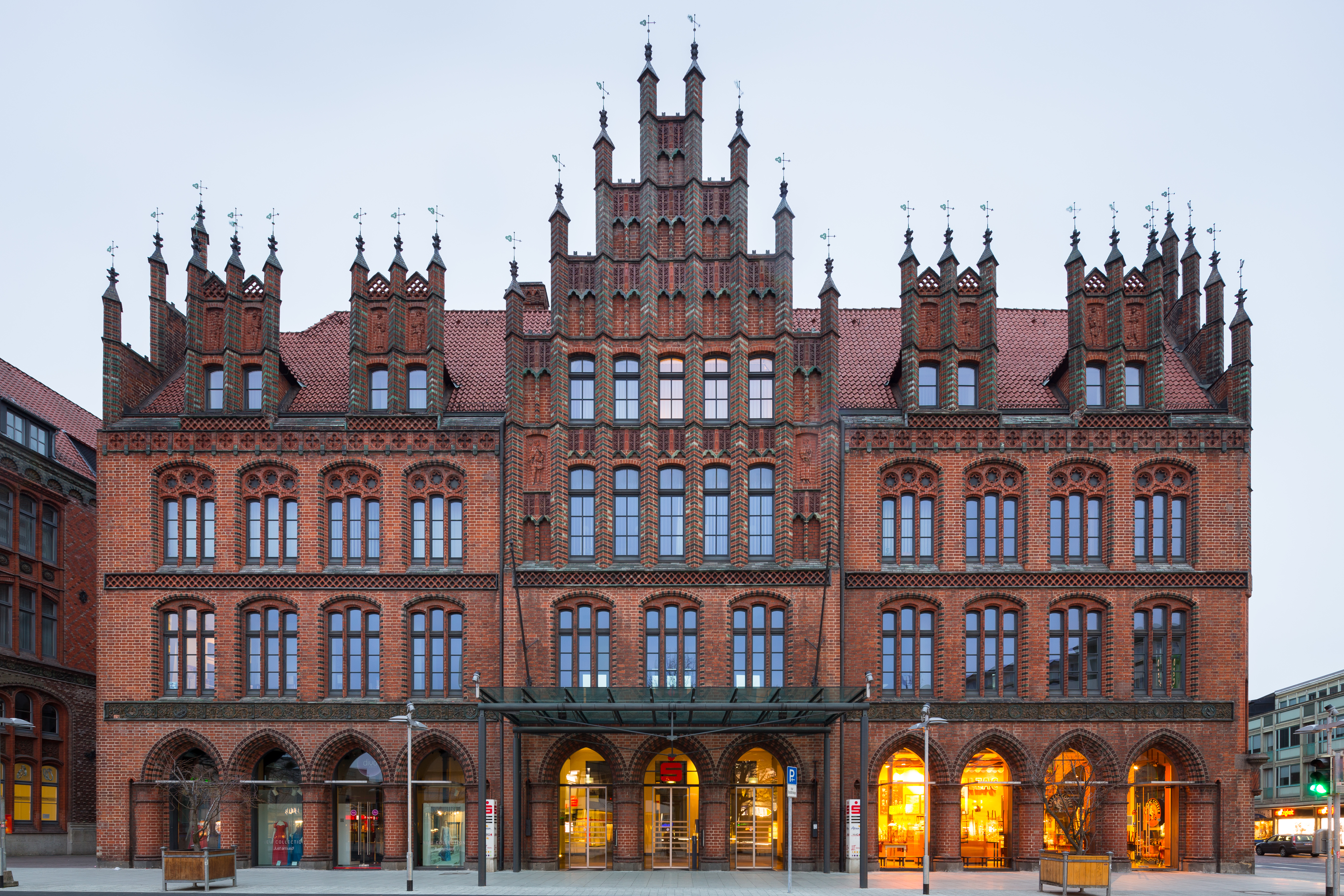
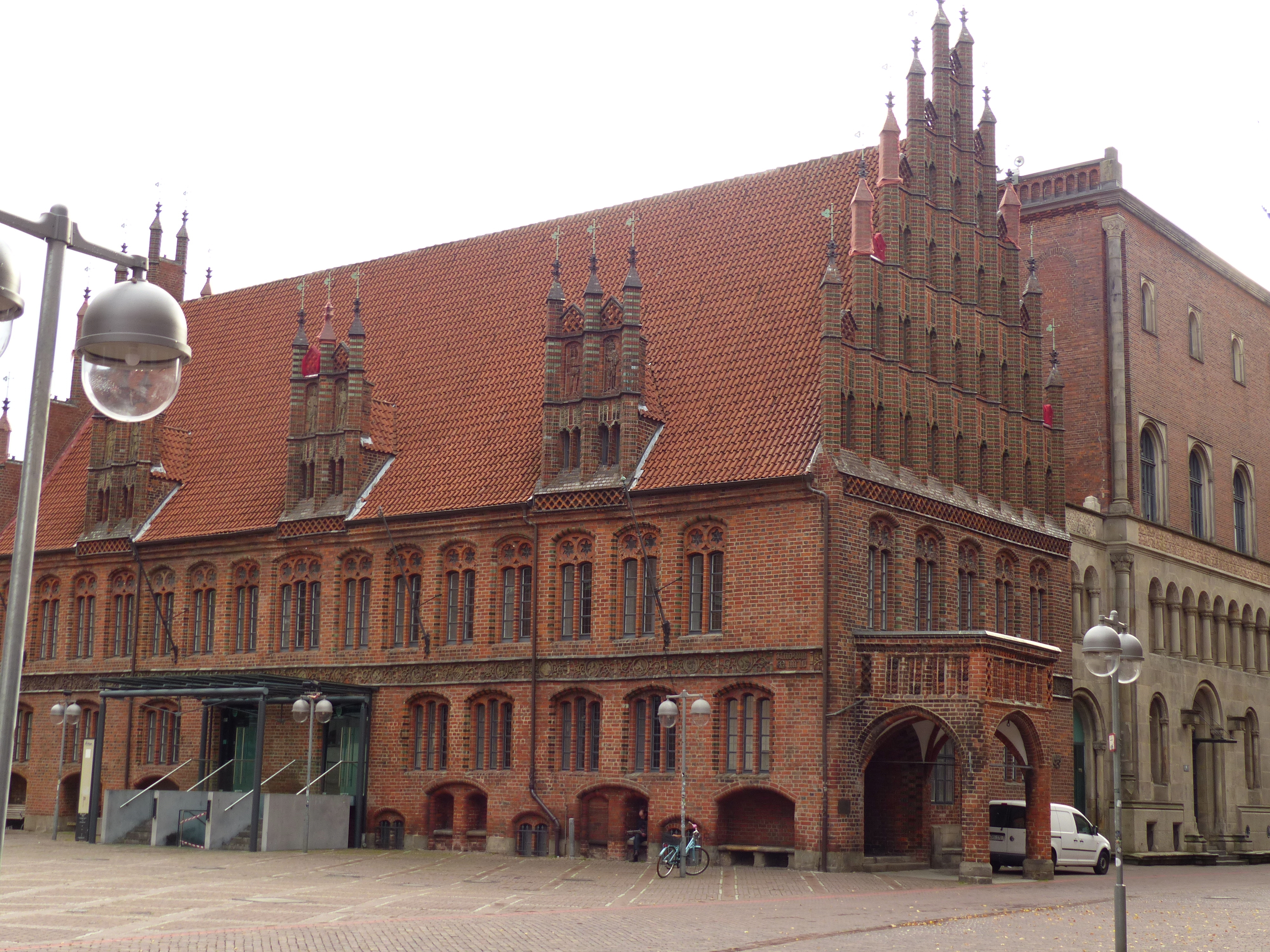
- Top: Newest part of building facing Karmarschstraße; Bottom: Oldest part of building, near Market Church
- Old Town Hall and the approximate location of the former 13th-century defensive wall encircling the old town (●) that grew around the market place and Market Church next to it

General information
- Location: Köbelingerstraße 4, Hanover, Germany
- Coordinates: 52°22′16″N 9°44′10″E
- Construction started: 1410; 616 years ago

Website
- www.hrg-hannover.de/immobilienverwaltung/altes-rathaus/

The Old Town Hall (German: Altes Rathaus) is a former, and the first, town hall in Hanover, Germany. Originally built in the old city district in 1410, replaced by the New Town Hall in 1913, and extensively restored in 1953 and 1964 after heavy bomb damage in the Second World War, it is the oldest secular building in the city. The market façade in the Brick Gothic style with distinctive lucarnes has been preserved and partly restored in its medieval shape. Some elements of it were copied on other wings of the building.

== History ==
Prior to the construction of the town hall, the Council of the City of Hanover met in various places around the city. It is documented that between 1303 and 1410, the council met in the city's theatre, in the market yard, and at the courthouse.

The first part of the building, facing the Market Church, was erected in the Brick Gothic style with distinctive lucarnes in 1410. The building was extended along Schmiedestraße between 1409 and 1413 and then extended on Köbelingerstraße to create a half-timbered building known as the apothecary wing between 1566 and 1567. According to the Hanover Chronicle, two new prisons were set up in the town hall in 1607. In 1844, a renovation of the wings took place and the apothecary wing was demolished and replaced by a municipal court designed in the Italian Renaissance style by August Heinrich Andreae: it was referred to as the Doge's Palace.

In 1863, the city administration left the Old Town Hall and moved into the Wangenheim Palace, before later moving to the New Town Hall. After the old town hall was slated to be demolished at the end of the 19th century, a citizens' initiative was formed and the building was ultimately spared. The architect Conrad Wilhelm Hase oversaw a renovation of the building from 1877 to 1891, restoring it to the condition it was in when it was built, as it was considered a "pure" architectural style in the Hanoverian school of architecture. The windows of the ground floor and the first floor had been rectangular at the time, but building photographs by Ludwig Droste in 1864 and Hase in preparation for the renovation show that both floors on the north-west facade and the ground floor on the north-east facade originally had segmental arched windows. In 1881, Hase had a new wing added, in the Gothic Revival style, on Karmarschstraße.

Following the air raids on Hanover, which led to the partial destruction of the complex in October 1943 during the Second World War, the building was restored in the early 1950s.

On 19 June 2001, a young child was killed by a statue, which accidentally toppled in a restaurant.

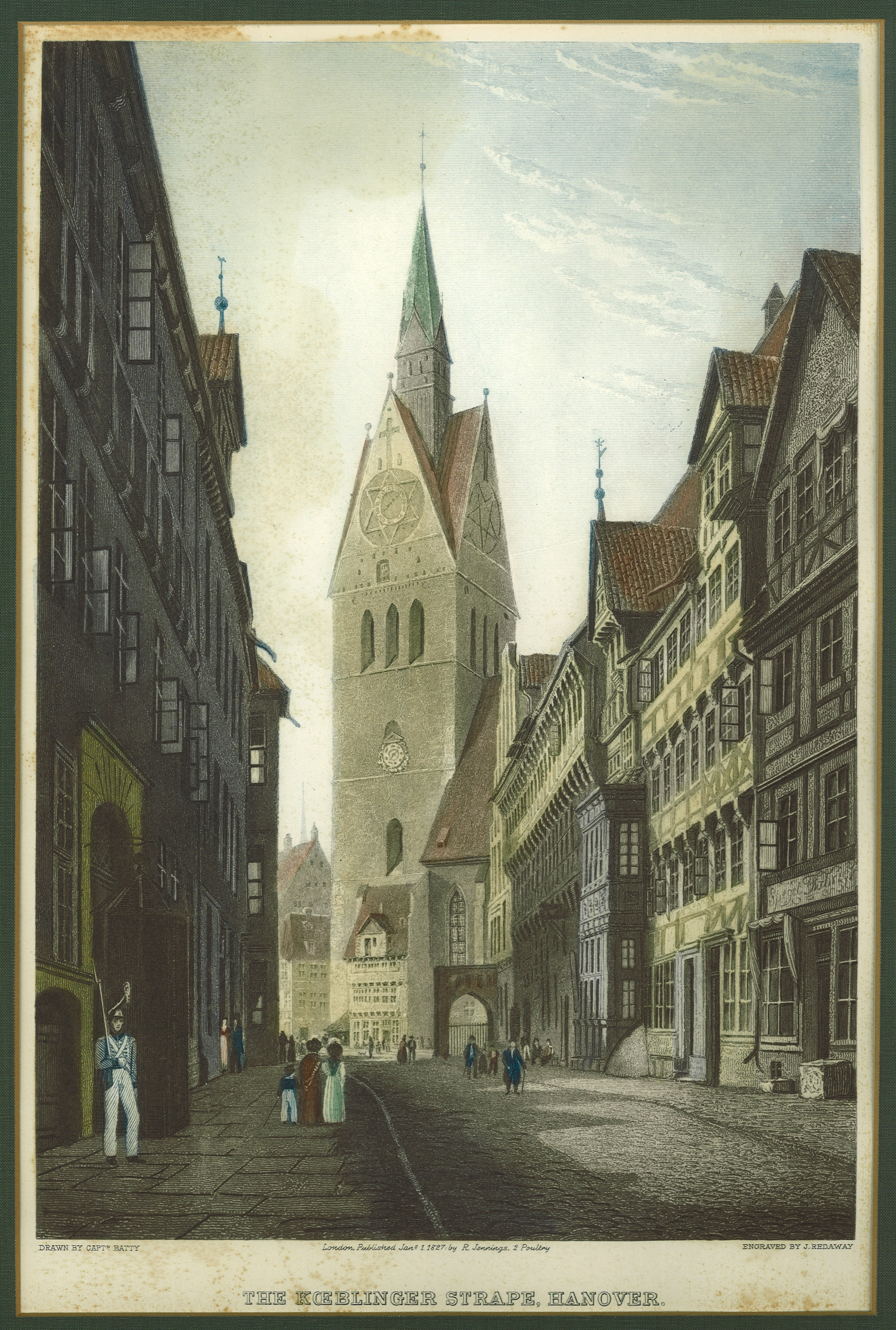
Old Town Hall seen on right of Köbelingerstraße obscuring Market Church in back-right, drawn before 1827

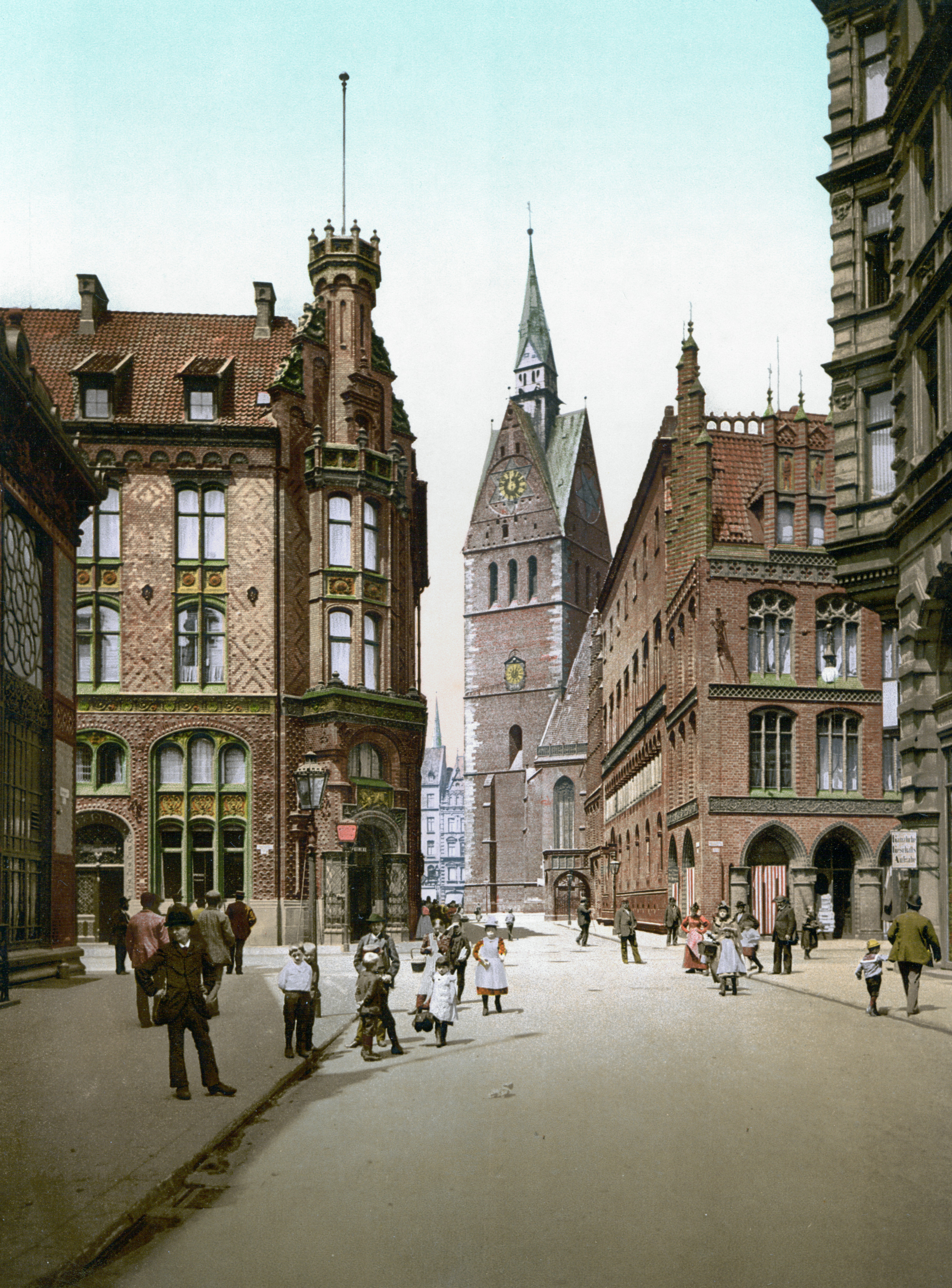
Old Town Hall c. 1890–1905 with Grupenstraße (now Karmarschstraße) built after Pharmacist wing (Apothekerflügel) was demolished in 1844

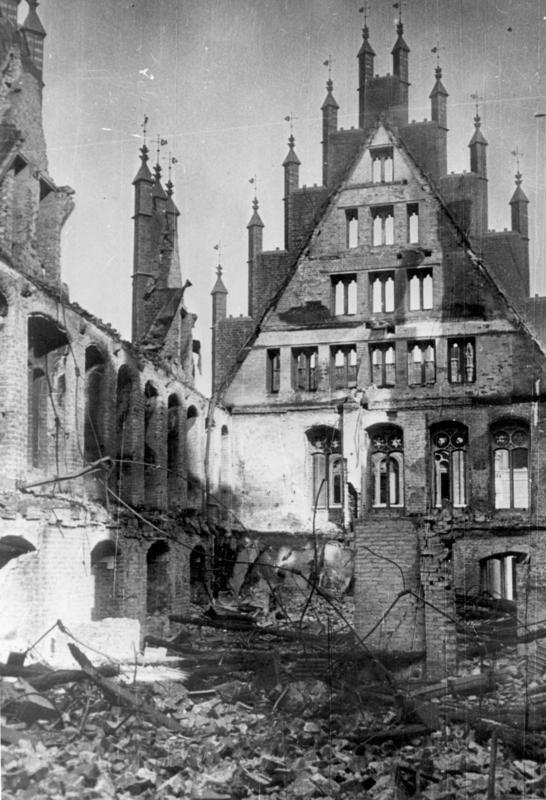
Interior bomb damage during the Second World War
