= August Heinrich Andreae =

German architect, painter, and etcher

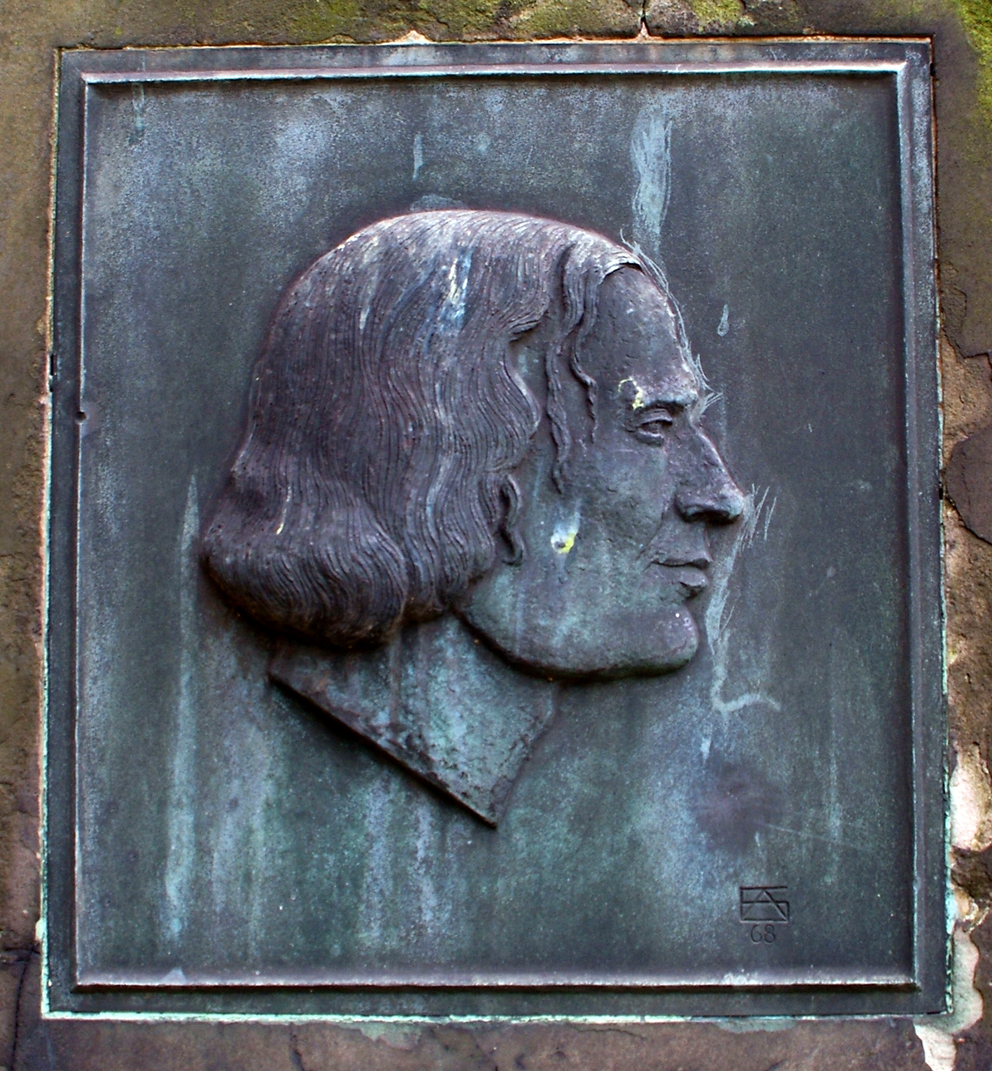
- Born: 4 December 1804
- Died: 6 January 1846 (aged 41)
- Known for: Architecture; painting; etching

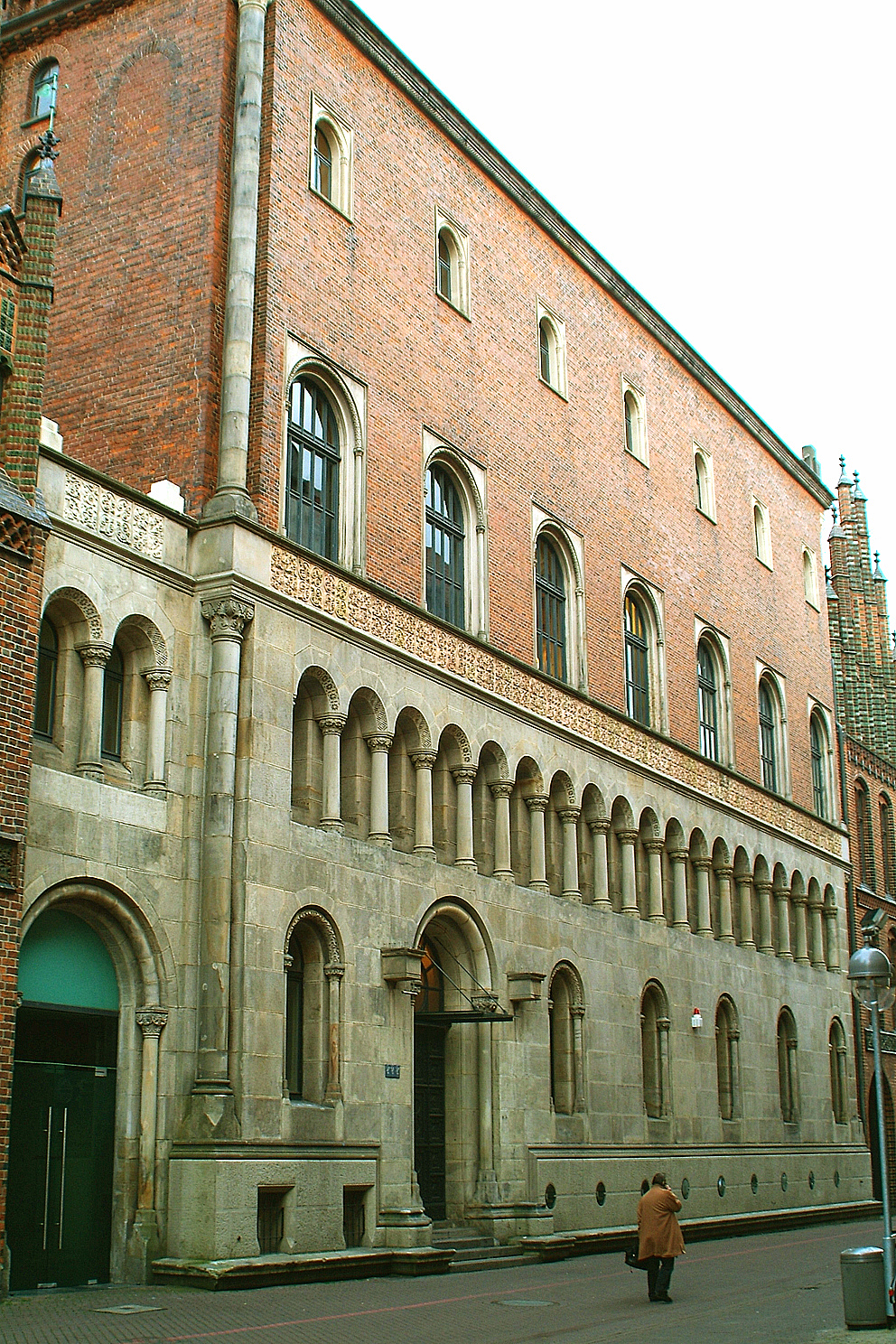
The court wing of the Altes Rathaus, Hannover

August Heinrich Andreae (4 December 1804, Garbsen – 6 January 1846, Hanover) was a German architect, painter, and etcher.

== Biography ==
His father was a pastor. He first studied architecture with Diederich Christian Ludwig Witting in Hanover. This was followed by studies with Friedrich Weinbrenner in Karlsruhe (1823), and Georg Moller in Darmstadt (1826). Soon after, he applied for a position with the Royal Hanoverian Court Building Office, but was rejected. Instead, he volunteered at the War Chancellery, and became a construction supervisor.

When he had gained some experience, he took and passed the state examination, and created several apartments in Hanover, which established his reputation. In 1829, he succeeded Justus Gerhard Kahle (retired) as Hannover's Master Builder. His first major project was the new city hospital, which occupied him until 1832. His design incorporated elements from Italian Renaissance architecture. The building was heavily remodeled twice, in 1858 and 1933, and ultimately destroyed by an air raid during World War II.

In 1835, he designed the replacement building for the Altes Rathaus (old town hall). The prison wing was built from 1839 to 1841, but the court wing was not completed until 1850, four years after his death. During construction of the prison wing, he visited southern Germany and Venice. In 1845, he built a water tower for the waterworks.

In recognition of his work, the city provided him with a house and garden. Shortly after moving in, he married a woman from Oldenburg. Only a few months later, he fell ill with consumption.

He died the following year, and was interred at the Old St. Nicholas Cemetery. A street was named after him in 1847, but it was torn up in 1865 to make room for a storage facility.
