= Broyhan House =

Half-timbered building in Hanover, Germany

- Native name: Broyhanhaus (German)
- Industry: Restaurant
- Key people: Cord Broyhan
- Building details
- Broyhanhaus (German)
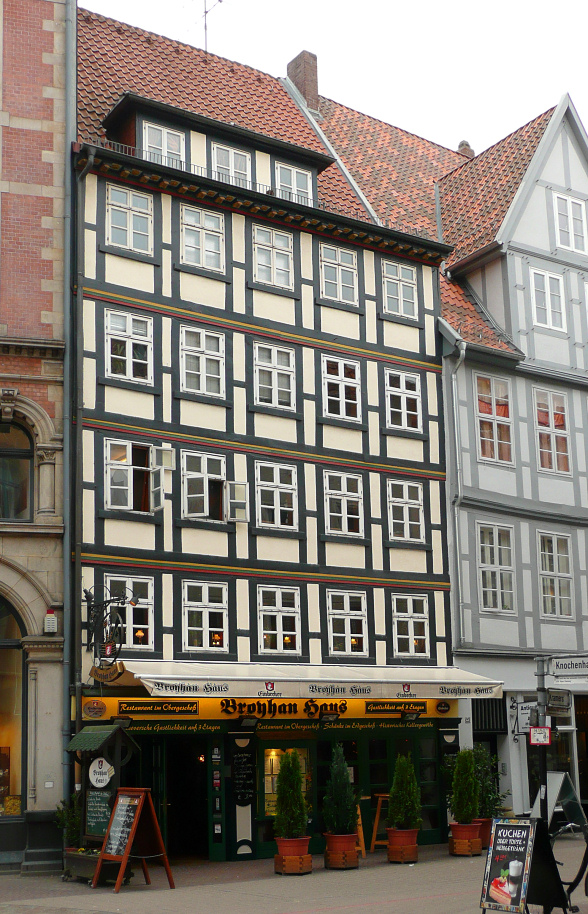
- Broyhan House in 2011. The façade dates to 1830, and does not correspond in form nor colour with its original appearance.

General information
- Location: 50 m (160 ft) west of Market Church, 24 Merchant Street (Kramerstraße 24), Hanover, Germany
- Coordinates: 52°22′18″N 9°44′03″E
- Construction started: 1576; 450 years ago
- Website: www.broyhanhaus.de

Broyhan House (German: Broyhanhaus) is a residential and commercial building constructed in 1576 in Hanover's historic old town (Altstadt). It is the second-oldest preserved half-timbered building in Hanover, and stands on the cellar walls of an earlier building dating to the 14th century. The house is named after Cord Broyhan, a brewer who lived in an earlier building from 1537 until 1561. (Note: Cord Broyhan, who had trained in Hamburg but was originally from Stöcken about 6.5 kilometres (4.0 mi) northwest of Broyhan House, brewed the first Broyhan beer in Hanover at the end of May 1526 in the brewery (Brauhaus) of Hans von Sode at Leinstraße. Broyhan died in Hanover in 1570, before the current building was constructed.)

The beer that Broyhan is credited to have invented and that is named after him had a profoundly positive economic impact on Hanover. Broyhan beer ceased being brewed in 1919, but the Gilde Brewery that resulted from the brewers guild formed in 1546, in part by Broyhan, is still operating as of 2024.

== Location and description ==
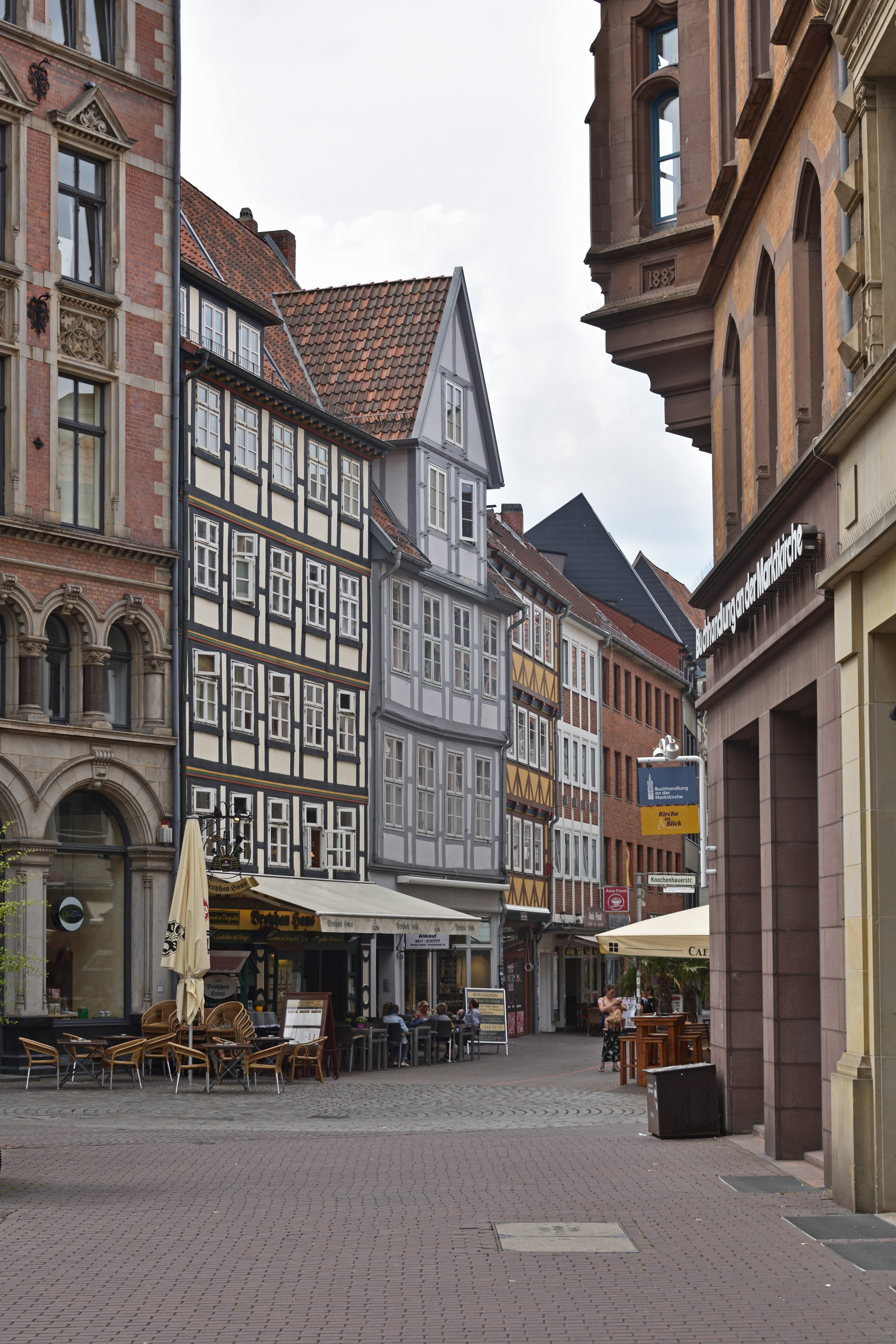
Merchant Street as seen from the market place in the east. Broyhan House is at number 24, the second building on the left, on the southern side of Merchant Street.

Broyhan House is located at 24 Merchant Street (Kramerstraße) amidst a row of historic half-timbered buildings just west of Market Church, in Hanover's old town. Ownership records for the residential and commercial building typical for early Hanover date back to 1428. The majority of owners were merchants (Kramer) (Note: Archaic northern German for Krämer.) who conducted their trade within the building.

Following examination in 1984, the building was restored until 1987. As of 2024, it houses a restaurant in the vaulted cellar and on its first two floors, and residents on the upper floors. Broyhan House is a listed architectural monument.

== General references ==
- Frontzek, Wolfgang; Kokkelink, Günther (1985). "Zur Baugeschichte des 'Broyhanhauses', Kramerstraße 24 in Hannover". Hannoversche Geschichtsblätter. Neue Folge 39: 135–168. ISSN 0342-1104. OCLC 231043632.
- Helmut Knocke; Hugo Thielen (2007). Dirk Böttcher; Klaus Mlynek (eds.). Hannover: Kunst- und Kultur-Lexikon (in German) (4th ed.). Springe: zu Klampen Verlag. p. 159. ISBN 3-88746-313-7. OCLC 258561223. OL 26769740M. Wikidata Q1576243.
- Hampson, Tim (2008). The Beer Book. p. 100. ISBN 9780756639822. OCLC 221163644.
- Knocke, Helmut (2009), "Broyhanhaus", in Klaus Mlynek; Waldemar R. Röhrbein (eds.), Hannover City Lexicon. From the beginnings into the present (in German), Hanover: Schlütersche Verlagsgesellschaft, p. 86, OCLC 458691668, OL 45212542M, Wikidata Q2327579
