= Schauspiel Hannover =

Theatre company in Hanover, Germany

Coordinates: 52.37347°N 9.74408°E

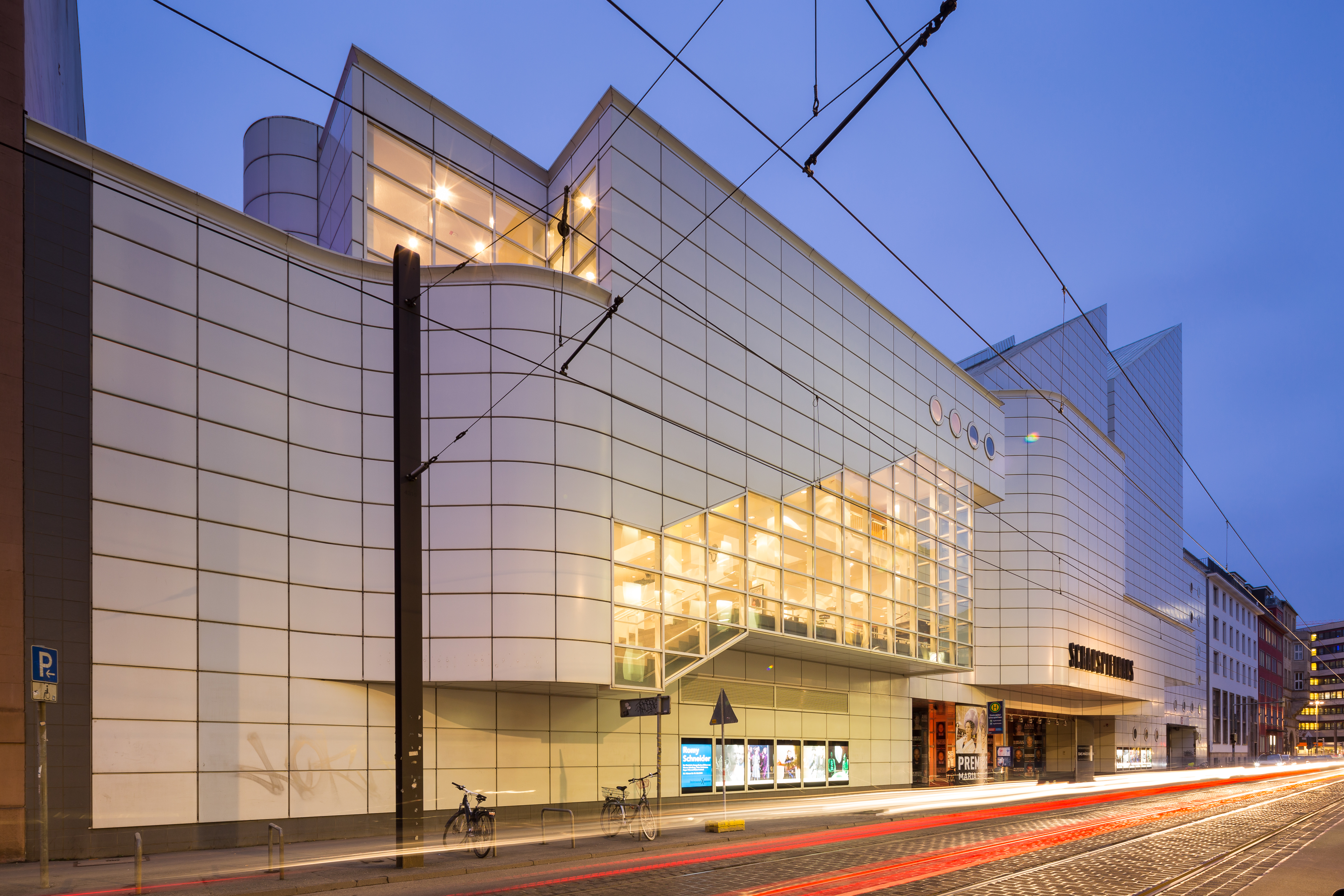
Hanover Playhouse is the main venue of the theatre company.

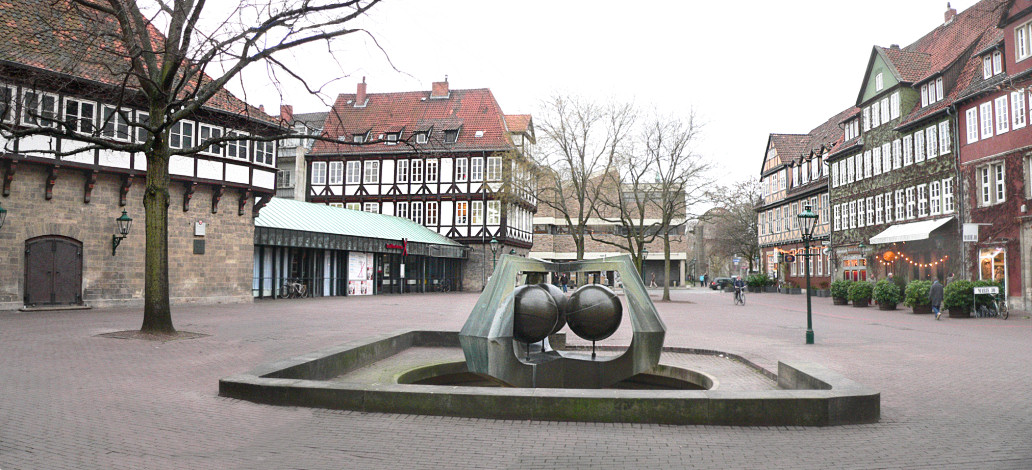
The Ballyard is the other venue.

Hanover Drama (German: Schauspiel Hannover) is a theatre company in Hanover, the state capital of Lower Saxony, Germany. The company is resident at the Hanover Playhouse (Schauspielhaus Hannover) situated approximately 200 metres (660 ft) east of Hanover Opera House, and the Ballyard situated approximately 530 metres (1,740 ft) west-southwest of the opera house in the old town. Collectively these venues have five stages:

- Large stage (Große Bühne)
- Cumberland stage (Cumberlandsche Bühne)
- Cumberland gallery (Cumberlandsche Galerie)
- Ballyard One (Ballhof Eins)
- Ballyard Two (Ballhof Zwei)

Hanover Drama is part of the publicly-funded umbrella performing arts organisation Hanover State Theatre of Lower Saxony (Niedersächsisches Staatstheater Hannover), or simply Hanover State Theatre (Staatstheater Hannover). This organisation comprises the following divisions that put on operas, stage productions, and concert programs, in addition to maintaining a theatre museum, with seasons running from September through to June:

1. Hanover Drama
2. Hanover State Opera (German: Staatsoper Hannover)
3. Hanover State Ballet (Staatsballett Hannover)
4. Hanover State Symphony Orchestra (Staatsorchester Hannover)
5. Hanover Theatre Museum (Theatermuseum Hannover)

== Venues ==
Hanover Playhouse, the main venue, was built in 1992 close to the main railway station, and is a complex that incorporates the parts of the Cumberland gallery that survived the aerial bombings of Hanover during World War II. Designed by the Swiss architect Claude Paillard, the large stage is situated on the second floor and – seating 630 people – is typically the location of the opening of a new season. Two smaller stages are located in adjacent buildings; the Cumberland gallery, a heritage-listed building with a large staircase, is used for events with up to 85 spectators, and the Cumberland stage, a former rehearsal stage, for events with up to 198 spectators.

The complex also houses Hanover Theatre Museum, which presents temporary exhibitions and documentation of the history of the theatre.

Since the turn of the millennia, Ballyard One and Ballyard Two, which were the main stages for plays in the city for a long time, are used for youth theatre and opera.

== General references ==
- Frerking, Johann (1963). Augenblicke des Theaters: Aus vier Jahrzehnten hannoverscher Bühnengeschichte (in German). Velber bei Hannover: Friedrich.
- Helmut Knocke; Hugo Thielen (1994). "Prinzenstraße 9". In Dirk Böttcher; Klaus Mlynek (eds.). Hannover: Kunst- und Kultur-Lexikon (in German). Hanover: Schäfer. p. 183. ISBN 3-88746-313-7. OCLC 258561223. OL 26769740M. Wikidata Q1576243.
- Lange, Rudolf (1994). "Kleiner Spaziergang durch Hannovers Theatergeschichte". Prinzenstraße – Hannoversche Hefte zur Theatergeschichte (in German). 2. Hannover: Revonnah. ISBN 3931266109. ISSN 0949-4049. OCLC 609913751.
- Lindau, Friedrich (2001). Hannover: Wiederaufbau und Zerstörung; die Stadt im Umgang mit ihrer bauhistorischen Identität (in German) (2nd ed.). Hannover: Schlüter. pp. 253–290. ISBN 3-87706-659-3. OCLC 216497383.
- Meyer-Arlt, Ronald (25 November 2012). ""Hannovers schönstes U-Boot": Schauspielhaus wird 20". Hannoversche Allgemeine Zeitung. Verlagsgesellschaft Madsack. Archived from the original on 10 December 2012.
- Rahlfs, Heinz (1928). Die städtischen Bühnen zu Hannover und ihre Vorläufer in wirtschaftlicher und sozialer Hinsicht (in German). Hannover: Wirtschaftswissenschaftliche Gesellschaft zum Studium Niedersachsens. OCLC 1962597.
- Thielen, Hugo (2009). "Schauspielhaus". In Klaus Mlynek; Waldemar R. Röhrbein (eds.). Hannover City Lexicon. From the beginnings into the present (in German). Hanover: Schlütersche Verlagsgesellschaft. p. 538. ISBN 978-3-89993-662-9. OCLC 458691668. OL 45212542M. Wikidata Q2327579.
