= Lenelotte von Bothmer =

German politician and writer

Helene-Charlotte (Lenelotte) von Bothmer née Wepfer (27 October 1915, Bremen – 19 June 1997, Isernhagen near Hanover), was a German politician (SPD) and writer.

== Biography ==
=== Family, education and profession ===
Bothmer was the daughter of geologist Emil Wepfer and Anna-Maria Meyer. She married the teacher Hermann von Bothmer in 1939 (1912–1987), son of the landowner Thorwald von Bothmer.

She studied German Studies, English Studies and History at the Berlin and Tübingen universities. She worked as a teacher at a women's technical school. After the war she worked as an interpreter for the military government in the British sector and as a museum teacher for the city of Hanover.

=== Politics ===
Bothmer joined the SPD in 1945. She was a member of the sub-district executive of the SPD Peine-Burgdorf for eight years. She chaired the sub-district women's committee and the district women's committee of the SPD and was a member of the SPD district executive committee in Hanover and the party council of the federal SPD.

She was a member of the Lower Saxony State Parliament from 1966 to 1967 and of the German Bundestag from 1969 to 1980. She was a member of the Bundestag Committees on Education and Science and on Foreign Affairs, among others. She was particularly committed to peace policy and the fight against apartheid in South Africa.

From 1971 to 1983, Bothmer was chairwoman of the Bund für Naturschutz und Landschaftspflege in Niedersachsen (today BUND). She was the founder of the German-Arab Parliamentary Society and its president from 1976 to 1981.

On 14 October 1970, she caused a scandal because she was the first woman to give a speech in the Bundestag in a trouser suit. On 15 April 1970, she had already appeared in the plenary in a trouser suit. Prior to this, the vice-president of the Bundestag Richard Jaeger (CSU) had stated that he would not allow any woman to enter the plenary in trousers, let alone step up to the lectern. Provoked by this statement, she bought a light-coloured trouser suit and entered the Bundestag. She then received a large number of anonymous letters, some of which insulted her severely.

After withdrawing from politics, she became a writer and wrote several books and plays. At the Writers' Congress in Berlin (14/15 May 1986), she was elected to the Federal Executive Committee of the Verband deutscher Schriftsteller (VS), now part of ver.di, and held this office until September 1987.

== Writings ==
- Lieselotte Berger, Lenelotte von Bothmer, Helga Schuchardt: Frauen ins Parlament? Von den Schwierigkeiten, gleichberechtigt zu sein. (= rororo aktuell, rororo 1946). Rowohlt, Reinbek bei Hamburg 1976, ISBN 3-499-11946-3.
- Projekt Afrika. Hilfe zur Selbsthilfe? Arena, Würzburg 1981, ISBN 3-401-03959-8.
- Ich will nicht Krieg. Erfahrungen und Konsequenzen. Radius, Stuttgart 1982, ISBN 3-87173-614-7.
- Jossi und Abdallah. Erzählung. Weltkreis, Köln 1989, ISBN 3-88142-445-8.
- Mit der Kuh am Strick. Szenen aus den Dienstjahren einer Hinterbänklerin. Antonia, Hamburg 1996, ISBN 3-9804627-2-2.

== Audiobook ==
- Herr Böök begegnet. Geschichten von Lenelotte von Bothmer und Musik von Johann Sebastian Bach. Gesprochen von der Autorin. Ohrbuch, München 1990, ISBN 3-927689-15-7.

== Literature ==
- Klaus Mlynek: Bothmer, Lenelotte von. In: Dirk Böttcher, Klaus Mlynek, Waldemar R. Röhrbein, Hugo Thielen: Hannoversches Biographisches Lexikon. Von den Anfängen bis in die Gegenwart. Schlütersche, Hannover 2002, ISBN 3-87706-706-9, S. 66; online über Google-Bücher
- Genealogisches Handbuch des Adels, Adelige Häuser A Band XXI. S. 52, Band 98 der Gesamtreihe, C. A. Starke Verlag, Limburg (Lahn) 1990, ISSN 0435-2408.
- Barbara Simon: Abgeordnete in Niedersachsen 1946–1994. Biographisches Handbuch. Hrsg. vom Präsidenten des Niedersächsischen Landtages. Niedersächsischer Landtag, Hannover 1996, S. 50.
- Bärbel Clemens (Hrsg.): Frauen machen Politik: Parlamentarierinnen in Niedersachsen. Fackelträger-Verlag, Hannover, 1996, ISBN 3-7716-1585-2, S. 203ff.
- Klaus Mlynek: Bothmer, Lenelotte von. In: Klaus Mlynek, Waldemar R. Röhrbein (Hrsg.) u. a.: Stadtlexikon Hannover. Von den Anfängen bis in die Gegenwart. Schlütersche, Hannover 2009, ISBN 978-3-89993-662-9, S. 77.
