= Friedrich von Spörcken =

Hanoverian general

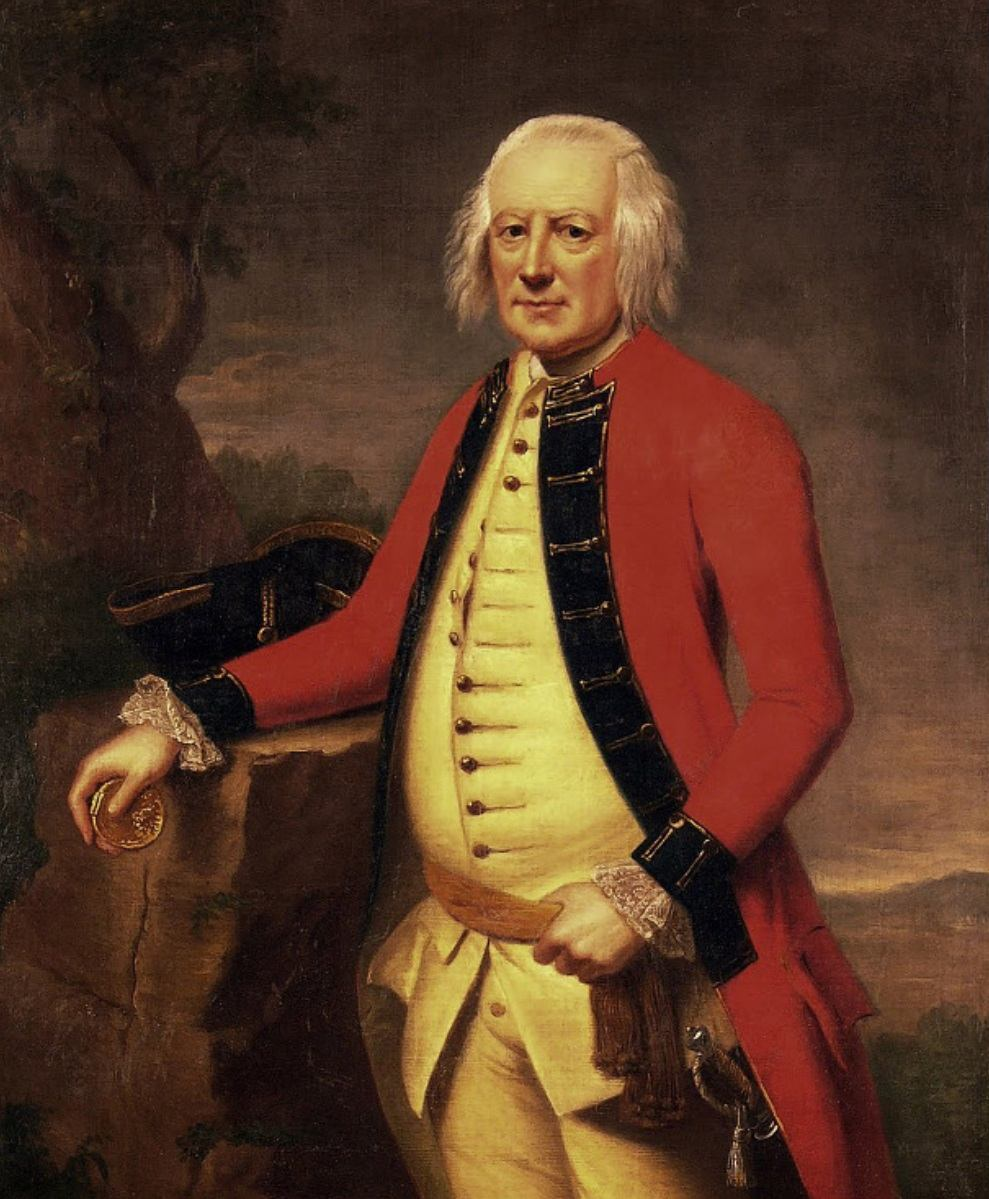
A portrait of von Spörcken

August Friedrich von Spörcken (28 August 1698 – 1776) was a Hanoverian Army officer best known for his service in the Seven Years' War. He served as part of the Hanoverian Army of Observation between 1757 and 1762, leading the Hanoverian contingent at a number of major battles including Krefeld and Minden.

== Early life ==
Spörcken was born on 28 August 1698. In 1715, he joined the Hanoverian Army, he served as part of a volunteer force during the War of the Polish Succession. He later went on to serve as part of the Pragmatic Army during the War of the Austrian Succession.

== Seven Years' War ==
When the Seven Years' War broke out, Spörcken was part of the Hanoverian Army of Observation established to defend Hanover and its neighbours from the French. Following the Battle of Hastenbeck, the Army retreated and was eventually forced to conclude the Convention of Klosterzeven, taking Hanover out of the war. This soon came under fierce attack in Britain and Prussia, with Frederick II of Prussia suggesting that the army should be reformed under the control of Spörcken.

Instead, when the Convention was revoked in late 1757, Ferdinand of Brunswick was given command of the force which launched a successful counter-attack driving the French back across the River Rhine. For the next five years, Spörcken was part of the army that successfully checked several French attempts against Hanover.

=== Battle of Minden ===
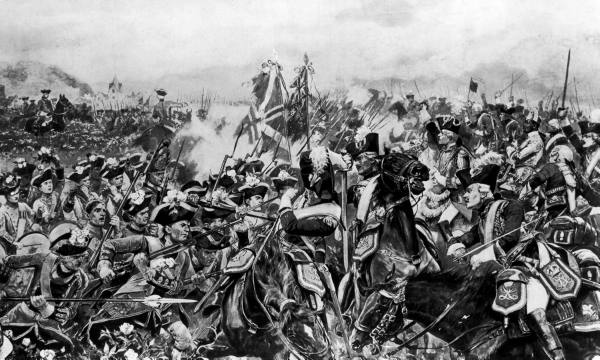
Battle of Minden, 1759.

In 1759, following the defeat at the Battle of Bergen, Brunswick's forces retreated northwards as the French under Contades pushed home a plan to invade Hanover. Deciding to halt them near the town of Minden, Brunswick

During the battle on 1 August 1759, Spörcken's division of mixed British and German infantry advanced without support, leaving them isolated. They were faced with repeated French infantry and cavalry attacks but managed to repulse them until further reinforcements came to their rescue. The Allied army was ultimately able to defeat the French and force them to retreat.

== Later career ==
Spörcken was promoted to Field Marshal in 1764 and placed in command of the regular Hanoverian forces, which were now substantially reduced, as well as the newly formed militia. He died in 1776.

== Bibliography ==
- Szabo, Franz A.J. The Seven Years War in Europe, 1757-1763. Pearson, 2008.

== Sources ==
- Mlynek, Klaus (2002). "Spörcken, August Friedrich". In Böttcher, Dirk; Mlynek, Klaus; Röhrbein, Waldemar R.; Thielen, Hugo (eds.). Hannoversches Biographisches Lexikon: Von den Anfängen bis in die Gegenwart (in German). Hanover: Schlütersche Verlagsgesellschaft. p. 342. ISBN 978-3-87706-706-2. LCCN 2002550672. OCLC 231977507. OL 3663458M. Wikidata Q1301650.
