= Mitte, Hanover =

Mitte
- Borough of Hanover
- Location of Mitte in Hanover
- Interactive map of Mitte
- Location within Germany Location within Lower Saxony
- Coordinates: 52°22′11″N 9°43′37″E
- Country: Germany
- State: Lower Saxony
- City: Hanover
- Subdivisions: 4

Area
  - Total: 10.76 km^{2} (4.15 sq mi)

Population (2020-12-31)
  - Total: 36,645
  - Density: 3,406/km^{2} (8,821/sq mi)
- Time zone: UTC+01:00 (CET)
  - Summer (DST): UTC+02:00 (CEST)
- Postal codes: 30159, 30161, 30167, 30169, 30175
- Dialling codes: 0511

Mitte (German pronunciation: [ˈmɪtə]; English: Middle) is the first borough of Hanover, the state capital of Lower Saxony. As of 2020, it has 36,645 inhabitants and consists of the quarters Mitte (10,554 inh.), Calenberger Neustadt (7,004 inh.), Oststadt (14,135 inh.) and Zoo (4,952 inh.). The district mayor is Cornelia Kupsch (CDU).

== Mitte Quarter ==
The Mitte quarter is located within the Cityring - a series of roads that surround the city center - and extends southwards to the location of the Maschpark and the New Town Hall.

=== Old Town ===
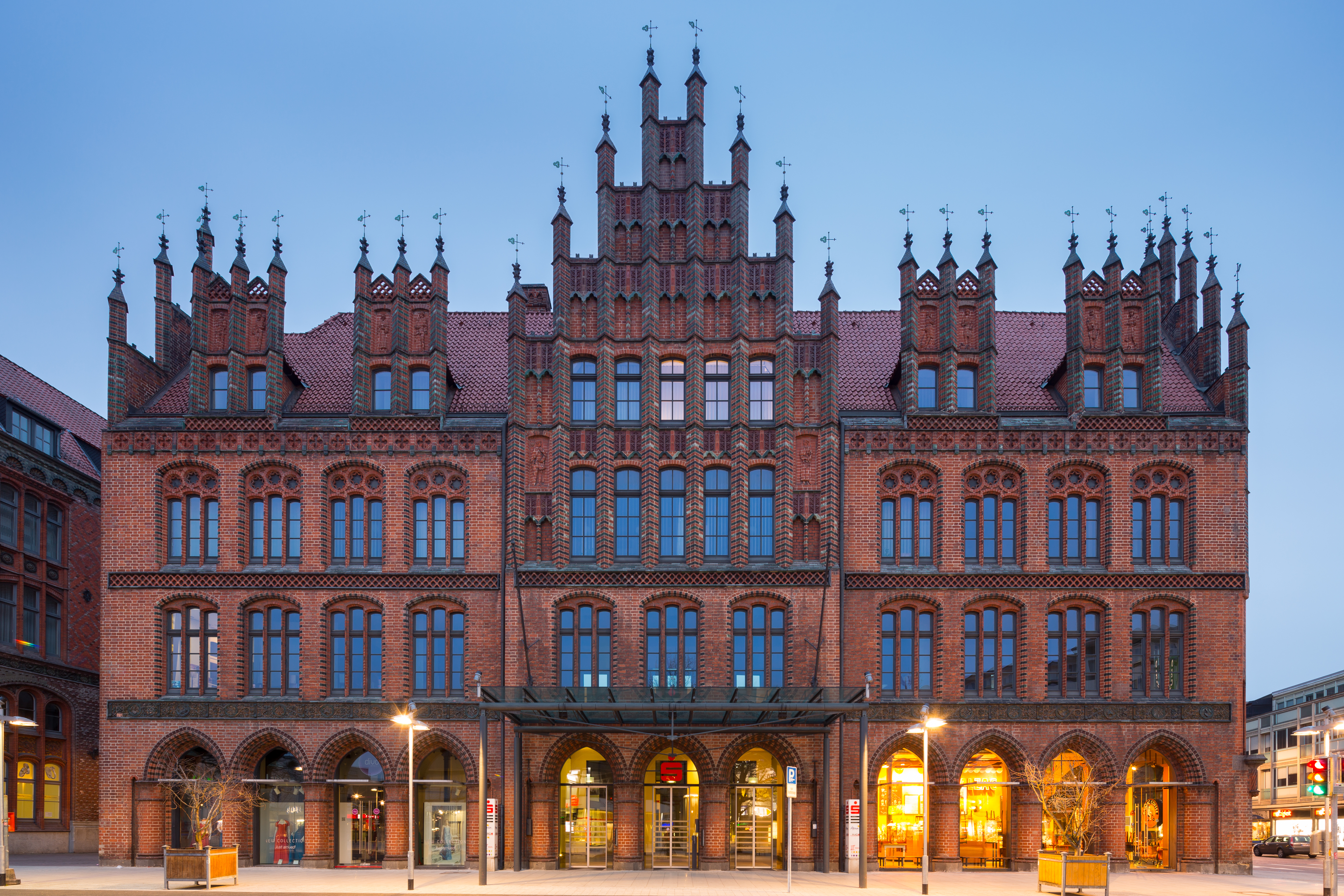
Old Town Hall

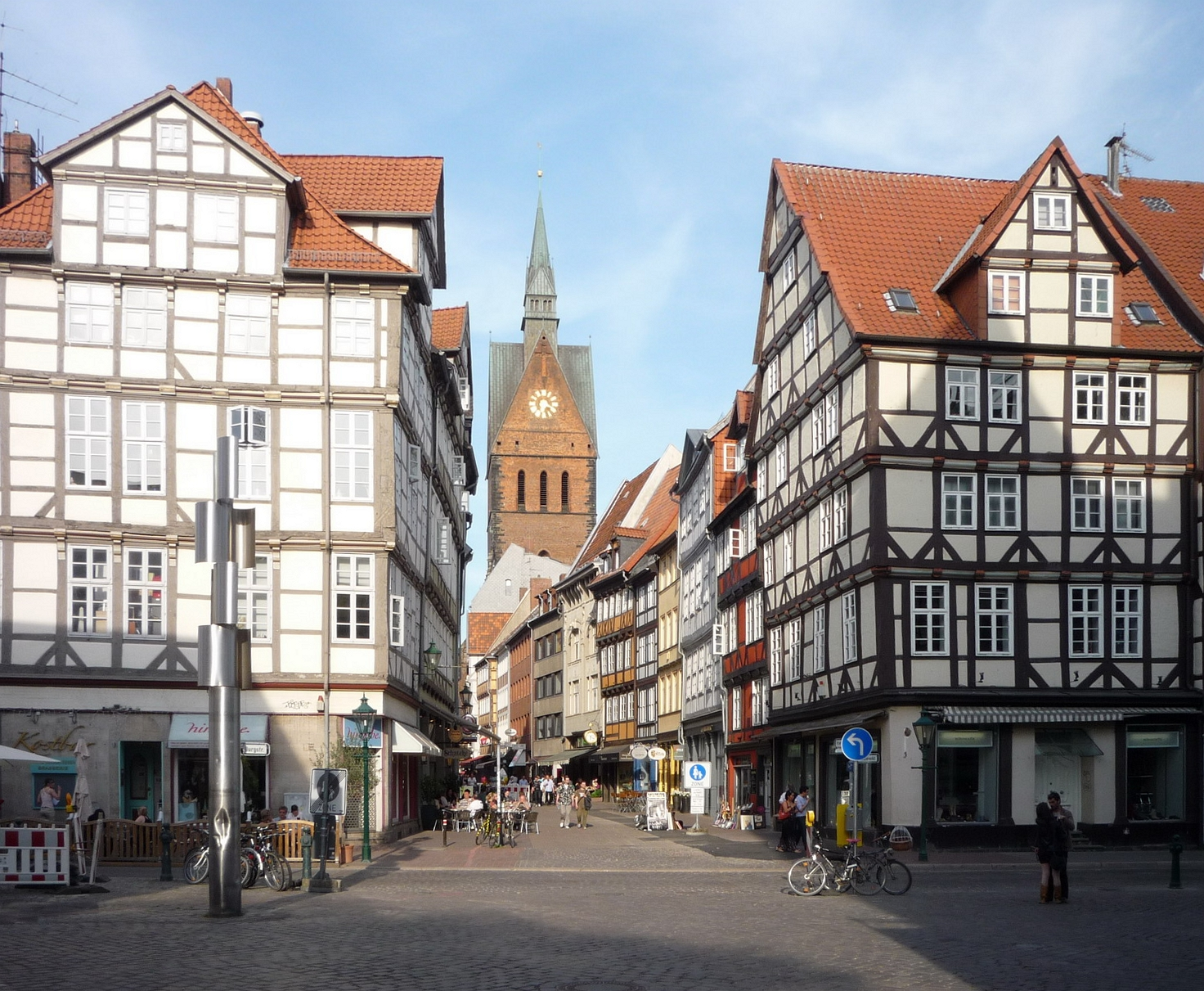
Kramerstraße and Holzmarkt

The historic old town of Hanover is located in the Mitte quarter between the Leine River, Friedrichswall, Georgstraße and Goethestraße. Due to the bombings in the Second World War, the historic old town was almost completely destroyed. Only in the Kramerstraße area (where the Broyhanhaus is located) and Burgstraße area (which contains the oldest half-timbered house in the city) were some half-timbered houses preserved or translocated to here. The Aegidienkirche, which was destroyed in the war, was not rebuilt; its ruins now serves as a memorial to the victims of wars and violence.

Formative historical buildings in the old town include the Marktkirche, the Old Town Hall, the Seilwinderhaus and the Ballhof Theatre. The Landtag of Lower Saxony, the state parliament, resides today in the Leineschloss at Hannah-Arendt-Platz. Remains of the historic city wall and the Beguinage Tower were integrated into the Historisches Museum Hannover, designed in 1966 by architect Dieter Oesterlen.

The Kreuzkirchenviertel around the Kreuzkirche was completely redesigned after the war and built in the style of the 1950s.

The old town is characterized by a variety of gastronomic offers. For over 40 years, the Altstadt-Flohmarkt flea market has taken place on Saturdays on the Hohe Ufer, a waterfront road running along the eastern side of the Leine. The market hall, known as the "belly of Hanover," offers a rich variety of food and gastronomy at 73 stands covering 4,000 square metres (43,000 sq ft).

=== Other neighborhoods ===
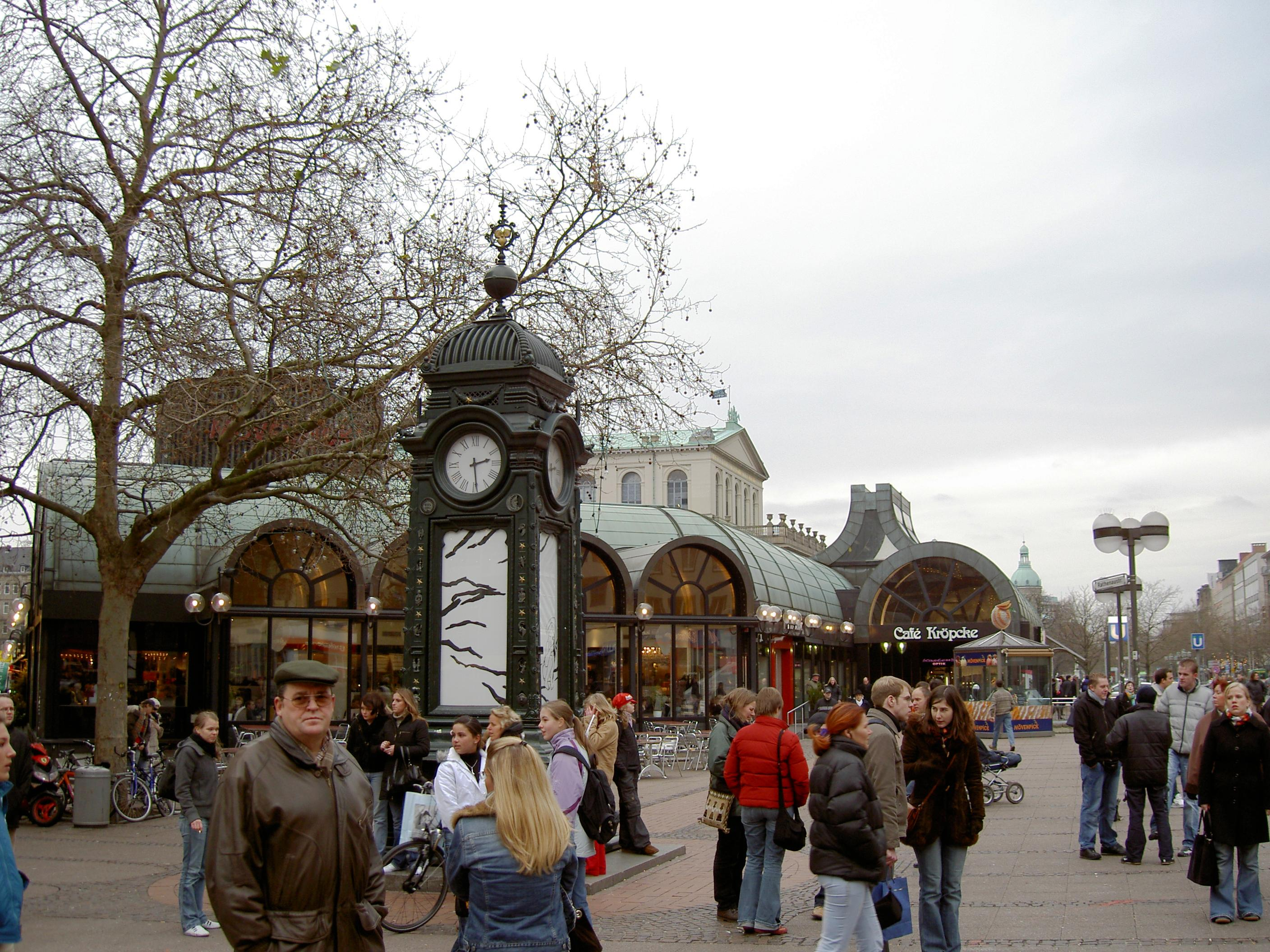
Meeting point Kröpcke

The area between the Georgstraße and the railway was developed in the middle of the 19th century by Georg Laves into the Ernst-August-Stadt, or Ernst August City. As a result of the subway construction, large areas of the city center in the Kröpcke, Georgstraße, Georgsplatz and Bahnhofstraße area became a pedestrian zone. The Kröpcke subway station is the most important station of the Hanover Stadtbahn light rail system. In the immediate vicinity are the Staatsoper Hannover opera house, the Schauspiel Hannover theater and other cultural venues.

The Bahnhofstraße flows into the Ernst-August-Platz plaza, the forecourt of the Hannover Hauptbahnhof, which is the main railway station for the city of Hanover. In October 2008, the Ernst August Gallery, a three-storey ECE shopping center with specialty shops, service and catering establishments, opened northwest of the main station. A smaller shopping center is the Ernst-August-Carrée, which was built from the 2000s in a historic building complex that had long served as an administrative building for the Deutsche Bundesbahn.

At the beginning of the 19th century northwest of the city of Hanover, the Steintor garden community was divided into eight separate villages in 1829. In 1843, it was united together with the six villages of the Aegidientor garden community to form the Vorstadt Hannover, or Hanover Suburbs. It was incorporated into Hanover in 1859.

On the Klagesmarkt town square on 31 March 1979, the largest anti-nuclear demonstration to date and still the largest demonstration in Lower Saxony took place with about 100,000 participants. It was the final rally of the Gorleben-Treck demonstration against the use of nuclear energy, which began a week earlier in Wendland.

The area formerly belonging to the Oststadt between Hamburger Alley and Berliner Alley, as well as the railway was assigned to the Mitte district after the Second World War, became part of the Cityring. In the course of the expansion of the city, the suburbs of Fernrode (the area northwest of the Alte Celler Heerstraße, known today as Lister Mile) and Bütersworth (the area southeast of Fernrode) had emerged. At or near the Raschplatz plaza is the Hanover District Court, a CinemaxX cinema, the cinema at Raschplatz, discos, and bars. The Hanover Central Bus Station was newly built in 2013-14 next to its previous location. The U-Bahn-Station Hauptbahnhof is one of the most important stops of the Hanover U-Bahn.

The Warmbüchenviertel (historical name Kirchwende) is located between the streets Schiffgraben, Marienstraße and Berliner Alley. The district is characterized by insurance and other office buildings, and at the same time it is a residential district close to the city center.

== Calenberger Neustadt ==
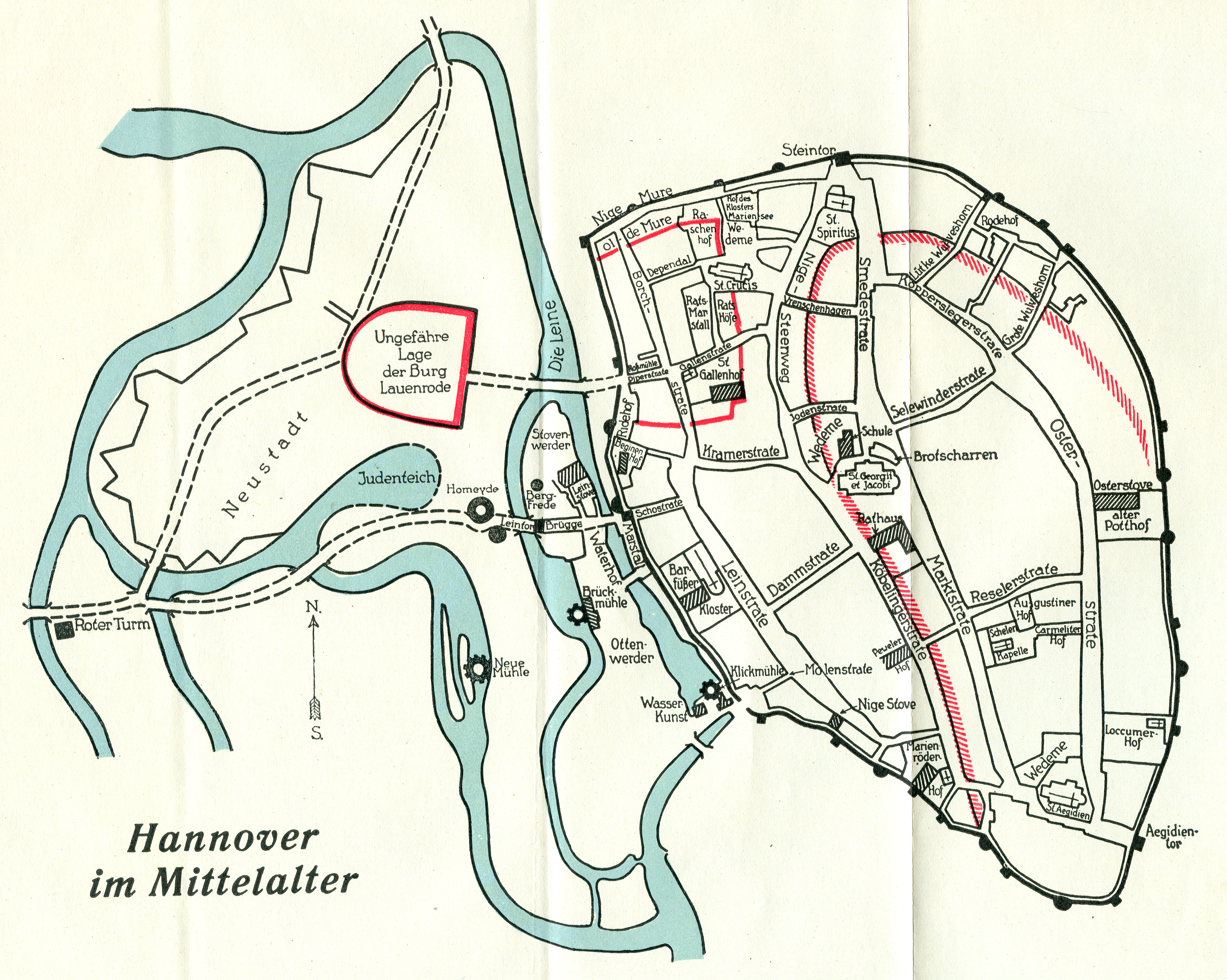
A Hanover city map sketch called "Hannover in the Middle Ages"; the later built Neustadt (left) still had several Leine branches and mills such as the Brückmühle. Drawn by Karl Friedrich Leonhardt in 1924 in his article "Roads and Houses in Old Hanover" in the Hannover History Sheets.

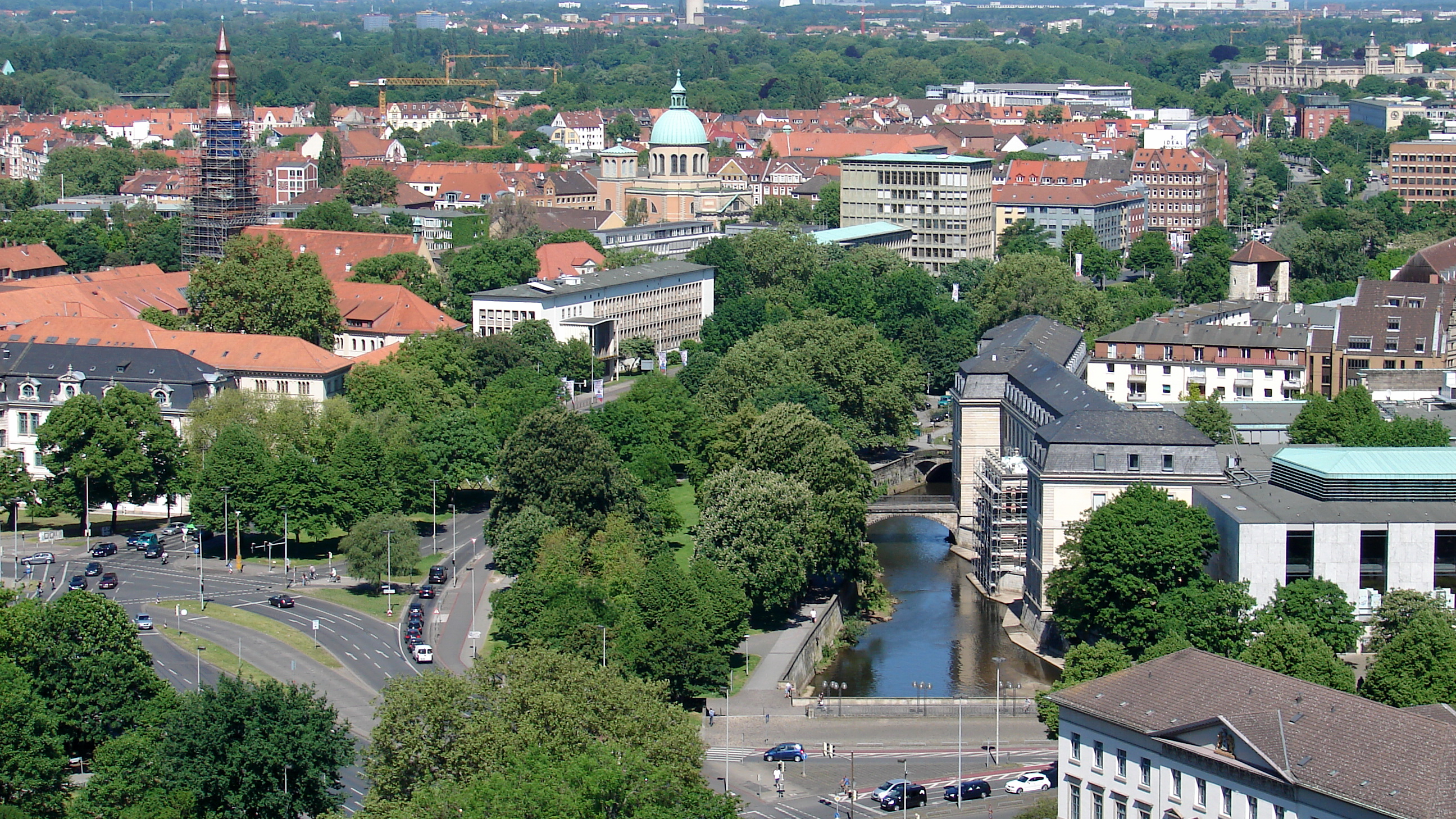
A view of Calenberger Neustadt with the Neustädter Kirche and St. Clement's Basilica.

In addition to the historic Calenberg Neustadt, today's quarter consists of the former villages of Königsworth, Ohe and Glocksee. The Leine, Ihme and Schneller Graben form the district border, rounded off in the north by Brühlstraße and the Bremen Dam as feeder of the Westschnellweg expressway. Along the Leine, the main traffic axis Leibnizufer forms the border with the Mitte district, so that the flea market is completely within its area.

== Oststadt ==
The Oststadt joins the Mitte district northeast. It is bordered by Hamburger Allee, Celler Straße and Wedekindstraße as well as in the east of the Eilenriede. It is the most populous quarter of the Mitte district.

== Zoo ==
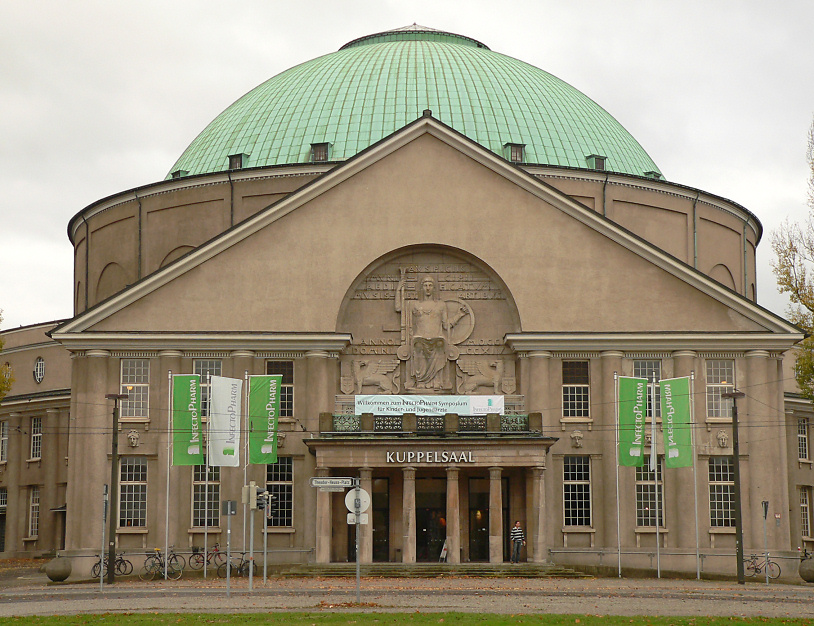
Dome hall of the Stadthalle Hannover.

In the Zoo quarter (also called Zooviertel and rarely called Hindenburgviertel) is the eponymous Hanover Zoo. Located within the quarter is the Stadthalle Hannover and the Stadtpark (city park), which was built on the grounds of the first Bundesgartenschau of 1951. The entire northern part of the Eilenriede belongs to the district. As such, the Lister Tower is also located in the Zoo district and not in the List district. The Hochschule für Musik, Theater und Medien Hannover is headquartered at the Neues Haus plaza.

== Borough Council ==
The council of the Mitte borough has 19 elected members and meets about eleven times a year. In addition to the announcement in the daily newspapers, the dates and the planned consultation points of the meetings open to the public can also be found on the city's website. The distribution of seats, the members of the city district council and their accessibility are presented on the website as well.

== Population ==
Population of Mitte since 2005

The borough's population has been rising steadily since 2005.

== Bibliography ==
- Regine Schramm, In the heart of the city. The old town: housing misery and poverty, in Adelheid von Saldern et al.: Everyday life between Hindenburg and Haarmann. Another city guide through the Hanover of the 1920s, ed.: Geschichtswerkstatt Hannover, Hamburg: VSA-Verlag, 1987, ISBN 3-87975-397-0, p. 63–68.
- Detlef H. O. Kopmann: Hannover-Oststadt. Sutton 2004, ISBN 3-89702-688-0
- Karl Friedrich Leonhardt: The beginnings of Hanover and the Calenberg Neustadt. In: Stadtarchiv Hannover (ed.): Hannoversche Geschichtsblätter. Jg. 30, 1927, pp. 146–240a.
- Wolfgang Neß et al.: Monument topography of the Federal Republic of Germany. Monuments in Lower Saxony. City of Hanover. (Volume 10.1). Edited by Hans-Herbert Möller, Lower Saxony State Administration Office - Publications of the Institute for Monument Conservation, Verlag Friedr. Vieweg & Sohn, Braunschweig/Wiesbaden 1983, ISBN 3-528-06202-9
- Helmut Knocke and Hugo Thielen: Calenberger Neustadt. In: Hannover Kunst- und Kultur-Lexikon. S. 98.
- Klaus Mlynek: Calenberger Neustadt. In: Klaus Mlynek, Waldemar R. Röhrbein (ed.) et al.: Stadtlexikon Hannover. From the beginnings to the present day. Schlütersche, Hanover 2009, ISBN 978-3-89993-662-9, p. 105f.
