= Eilenriede =

Municipal forest in Hanover, Germany

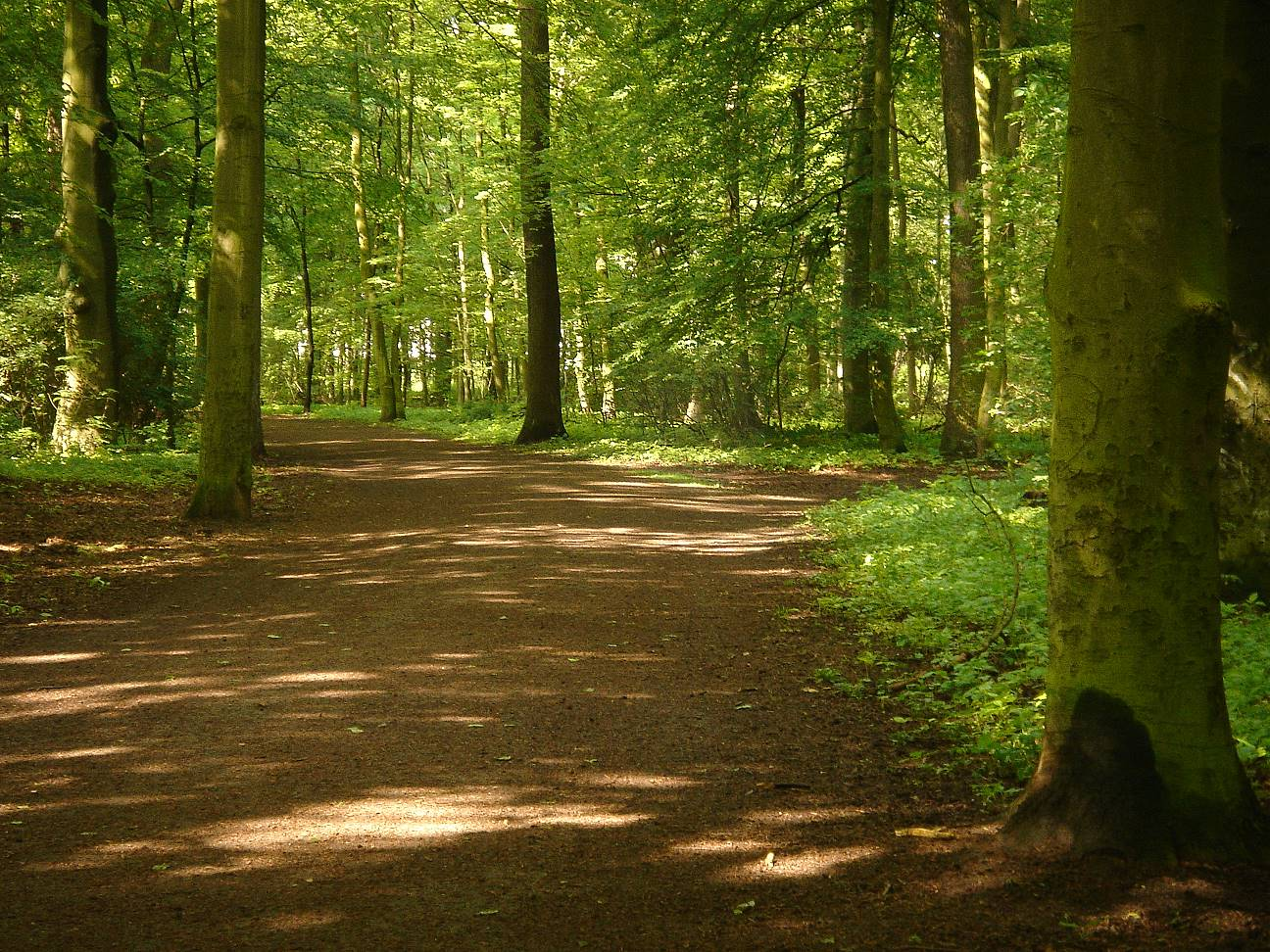
- Walking path in Eilenriede
- Interactive map of Eilenriede
- Location: Hanover, Germany
- Coordinates: 52°22′33″N 9°46′52″E
- Area: 640 ha (1,600 acres)
- Established: 1371; 655 years ago
- Etymology: Marsh populated with alder trees
- Open: Always
- Status: Open
- Camp sites: No
- Paths: 80 km (50 mi) walking; 38 km (24 mi) bicycle; 11 km (6.8 mi) riding

The Eilenriede (literally 'alder marsh' in German, meaning 'marsh populated with alder trees') is a 640-hectare (1,600-acre) municipal forest in Hanover, Germany. It is the largest urban city forest in Germany, one of the largest in Europe, and is nearly twice the size of Central Park in New York. The biggest German urban park in the strict sense of the word, however, is the 375-hectare (930-acre) English Garden in Munich.

== Size comparison ==
In Germany, the Eilenriede is part of a group of inner-city and near-city forest areas, like the Rostock Heath (6,000 hectares or 15,000 acres), the Dresden Heath (5,900 hectares or 15,000 acres), the Frankfurter Stadtwald (4,800 hectares or 12,000 acres) and the Berliner Grunewald (3,000 hectares or 7,400 acres). The Eilenriede is around the same size as the Stadtwald in Duisburg (600 hectares or 1,500 acres) and is nearly twice as large as Central Park (340 hectares or 840 acres) in New York.

== Location ==
Eilenriede encloses the south of the city roughly in the shape of a mirror-inverted letter 'C', extending about 6 kilometres (3.7 mi) from north to south. Reaching in its southwest to the Masch Lake, the Eilenriede is traversed by a network of 80 kilometres (50 mi) of walking, 38 kilometres (24 mi) of bicycle, and 11 kilometres (6.8 mi) of riding paths.

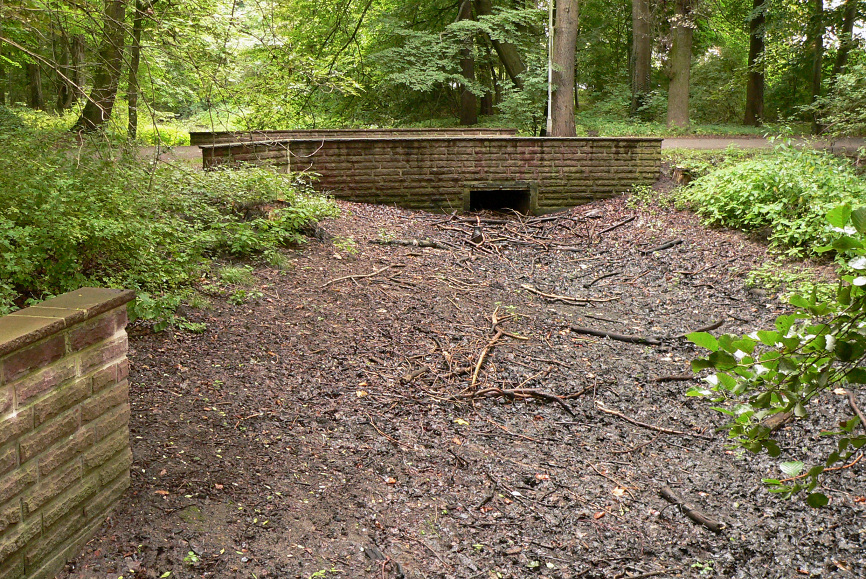
Dry creek bed

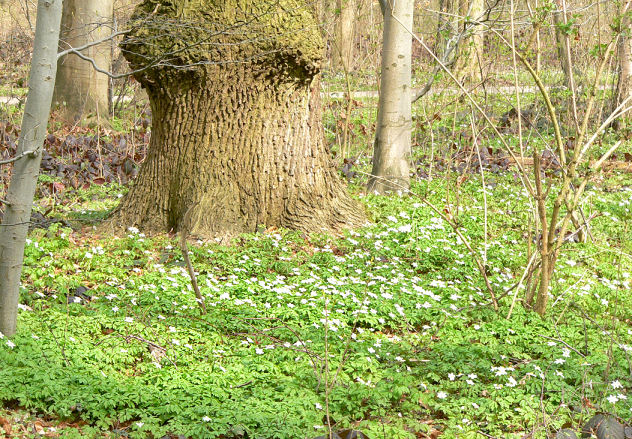
Blossom carpet on the ground in April

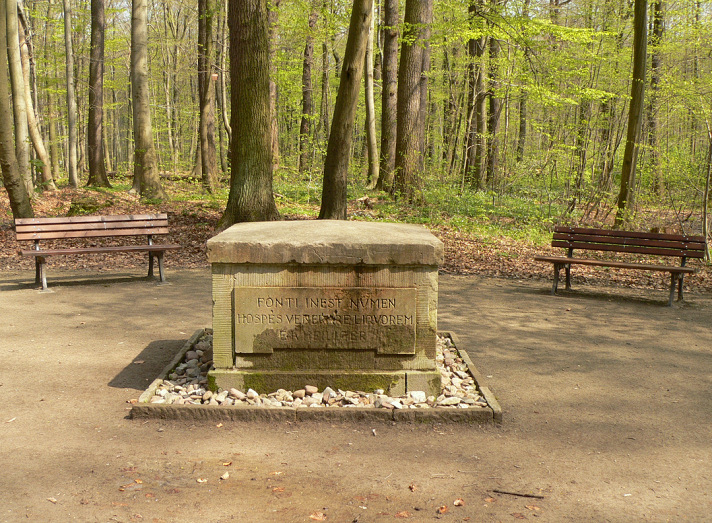
Heiliger's well (Heiligers Brunnen)

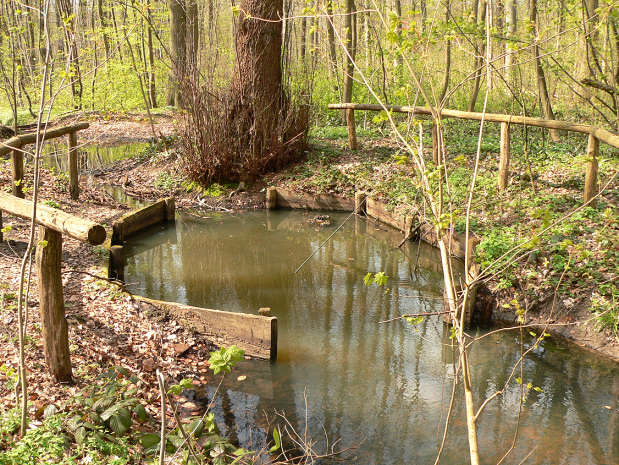
Historical bath place Teufelsbad (also called Kopperloch) near Heiliger's well

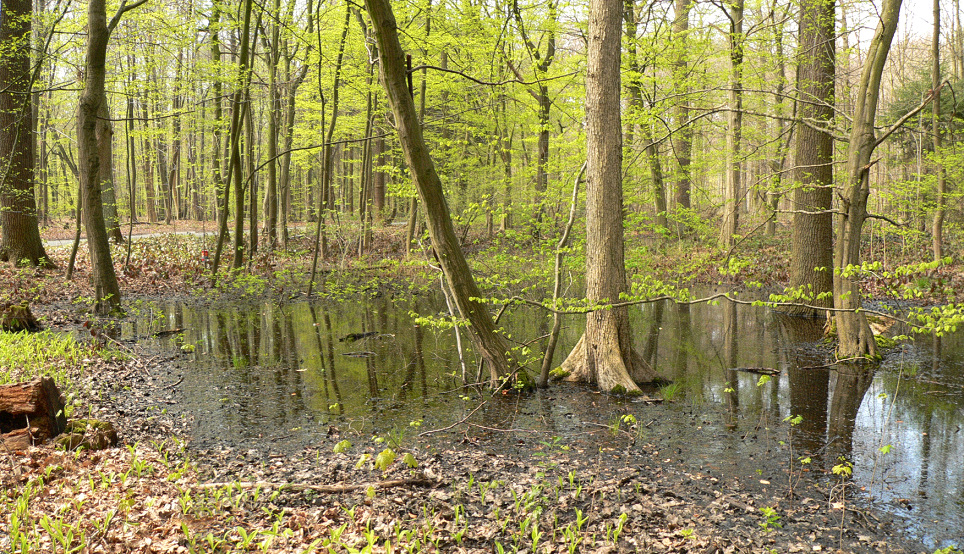
Widespread water area which can be seen in spring in the south of Eilenriede

== Activities ==
The city forest offers a range of different possibilities in leisure activities, like:

- Hanover Zoo
- Strolls and walks
- Horseback riding
- Bicycle riding
- Hiking
- Running
- Wood trails
- Children playground
- Woodstation
- Dendrology path
- Lawn for sunbathing
- Catering (restaurants, kiosks and forest cafes)
- Monuments and memorials
- Minigolf
- Bob run
- Path for the blind
- Skating area starting Lister Turm up to Steuerndieb
- High rope course
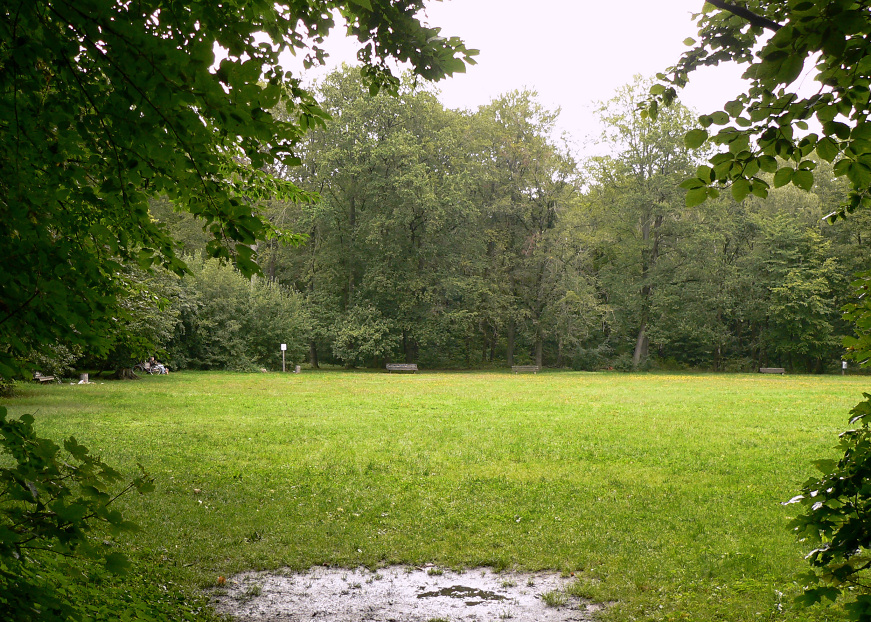
Lawn for sunbathing

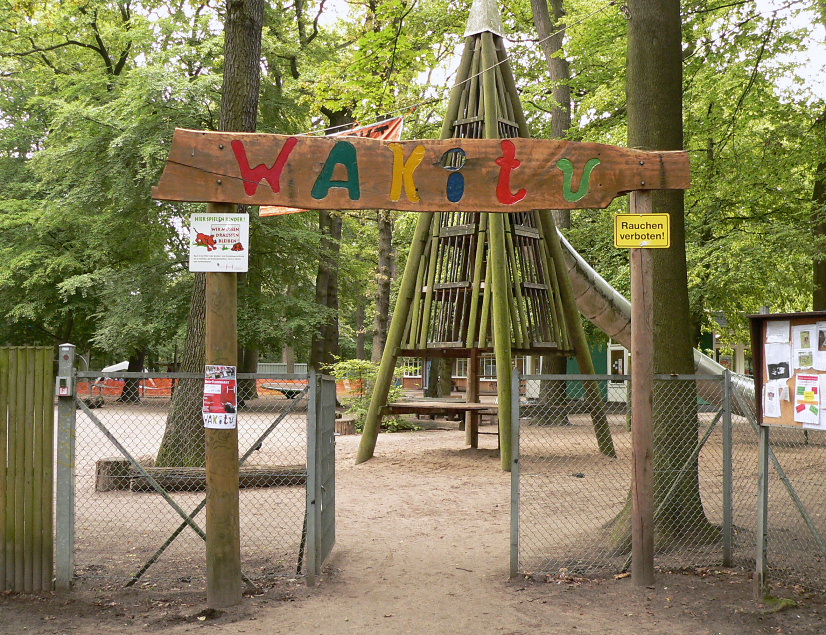
Entry to the kids playground WAKITU (Waldkindertummelplatz)

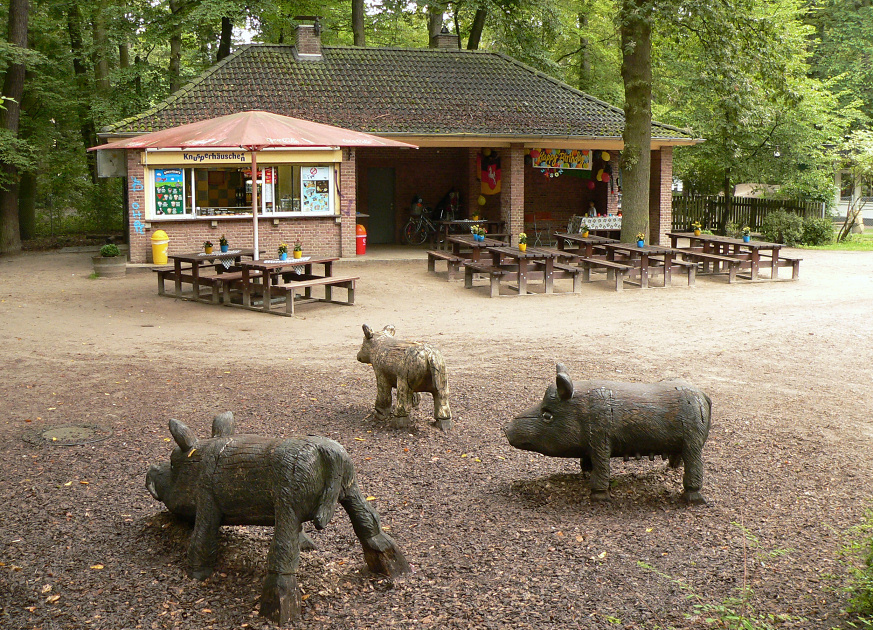
Kiosk with the forest

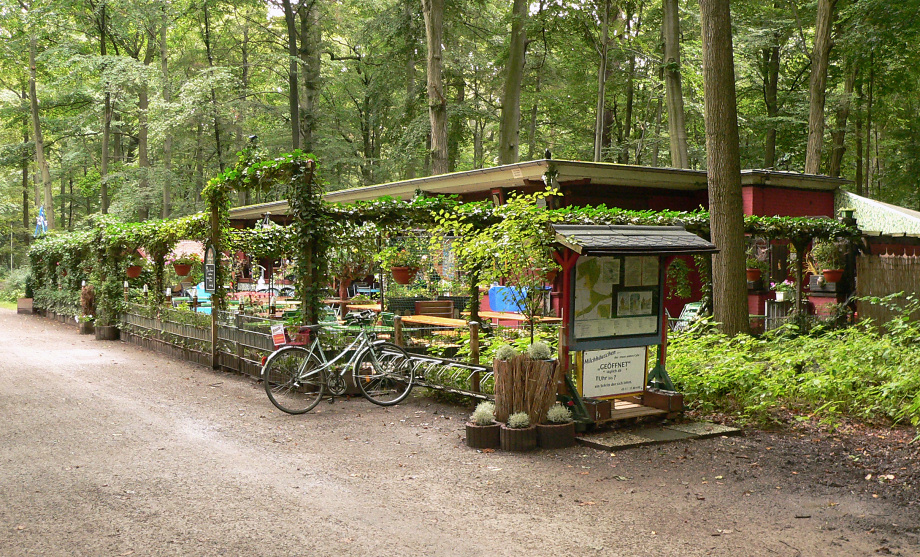
Forest cafe

== See also ==
- List of urban parks by size
- Jasper Hanebuth

== General references ==
- Kemper, Edwin; Nowak, Helmut, eds. (1971). Eilenriede-Festschrift. Hannover: Naturhistorische Gesellschaft zu Hannover. OCLC 29167376.
- Hans Brauns u.a.: Die Eilenriede. Sonderheft der Hannoversche Geschichtsblätter, herausgegeben vom Stadtarchiv der Landeshauptstadt Hannover, Hannover, Eigenverlag, 1938.
- Heine, Hans-Wilhelm (1981), "Die mittelalterliche Landwehr von Hannover", Guide to Prehistoric and Protohistoric Monuments (in German), Mainz: Verlag Philipp von Zabern, pp. 48–55, ISSN 0071-9757, OCLC 220493116, Wikidata Q112753823
- Jugler, August (1884). Die Eilenriede in alter Zeit – Ein Culturbild aus Hannovers Vergangenheit (in German). Hannover: Klindworth. OCLC 162769975.
- Speier, Martin; Pott, Richard: Der hannoversche Stadtwald "Eilenriede" in geobotanischer und historischer Sicht. In: Hundert Jahre Reinhold Tüxen. Geobotanik und Vegetationsgeographie. Hrsg.: Richard Pott. Hannover 1999, S. 279–303.
- Bettina Borgemeister: Die Stadt und ihr Wald. Eine Untersuchung zur Waldgeschichte der Städte Göttingen und Hannover vom 13. bis zum 18. Jahrhundert. Hannover, Hahn 2005. (Veröffentlichungen der Historischen Kommission für Niedersachsen und Bremen. 228) ISBN 3-7752-6028-5.
- Joachim Lehrmann: Räuberbanden zwischen Harz und Weser. Lehrte, Lehrmann-Verlag 2004. ISBN 3-9803642-4-0. (darin ausführlich Hannovers Raubmörder Hanebuth)
- Bettin, Felix; Dirscherl, Gerhard; Ernst, Carl Ferdinand; et al. (2016). Beck, Silke; et al. (eds.). Stadtwälder in Hannover: Die Eilenriede (PDF) (in German). Hannover: Landeshauptstadt Hannover.
- Drechsel, Johannes; Beck, Silke (2022). Drechsel, Johannes; Beck, Silke (eds.). Stadtwälder in Hannover: Eilenriedekarte (PDF) (in German). Hannover: Landeshauptstadt Hannover.
- Janet Anschütz (Autorin), ADAC Niedersachsen Sachsen-Anhalt (Herausgeber): Motorrad Rennsport: Internationale Eilenriede-Rennen zu Hannover 1924-1955. MatrixMedia-Verlag 2009. ISBN 978-3-932313-34-9
- Woldemar Lange; Jörg Buschmann (2009), Die große Zeit des DKW-Motorradrennsports : 1920 bis 1941 (Zschopau) (in German) (1. ed.), Witzschdorf: Bildverlag Böttger GbR, p. 368, ISBN 978-3-937496-29-0 (zu Eilenriede-Motorradrennen)
- Knocke, Helmut; Thielen, Hugo (1994). "Eilenriede". In Böttcher, Dirk; Mlynek, Klaus (eds.). Hannover: Kunst- und Kultur-Lexikon (in German). Hanover: Schäfer. pp. 101–. ISBN 3-88746-313-7. OCLC 258561223. OL 26769740M. Wikidata Q1576243.
- Benz-Rababah, Eva (2009), "Eilenriede", in Mlynek, Klaus; Röhrbein, Waldemar R. (eds.), Hannover City Lexicon. From the beginnings into the present (in German), Hanover: Schlütersche Verlagsgesellschaft, p. 149, OCLC 458691668, OL 45212542M, Wikidata Q2327579
