= Stadthalle Hannover =

Concert hall and event venue in Hanover, Germany

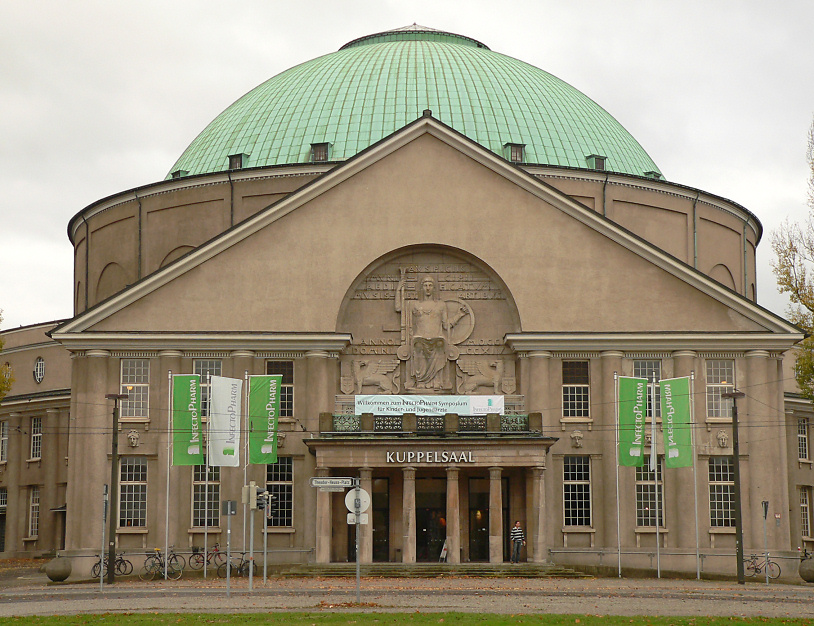
- Interactive map of Stadthalle Hannover
- Location: Hanover, Lower Saxony, Germany
- Coordinates: 52°22′33″N 9°46′09″E
- Capacity: 3,600

Construction
- Opened: 1914
- Architects: Paul Bonatz; Friedrich Eugen Scholer

Website
- www.hcc.de

The Stadthalle Hannover (Municipal hall) is a concert hall and event venue in Hanover, the capital of Lower Saxony, Germany. The large hall is called Kuppelsaal, after its dome. The hall was opened in 1914. It is the largest hall for classical music in Germany, seating 3,600. Severely damaged during World War II, it was restored slightly altered. The hall is now part of the Hannover Congress Centrum. The listed historic building is a landmark of the city.

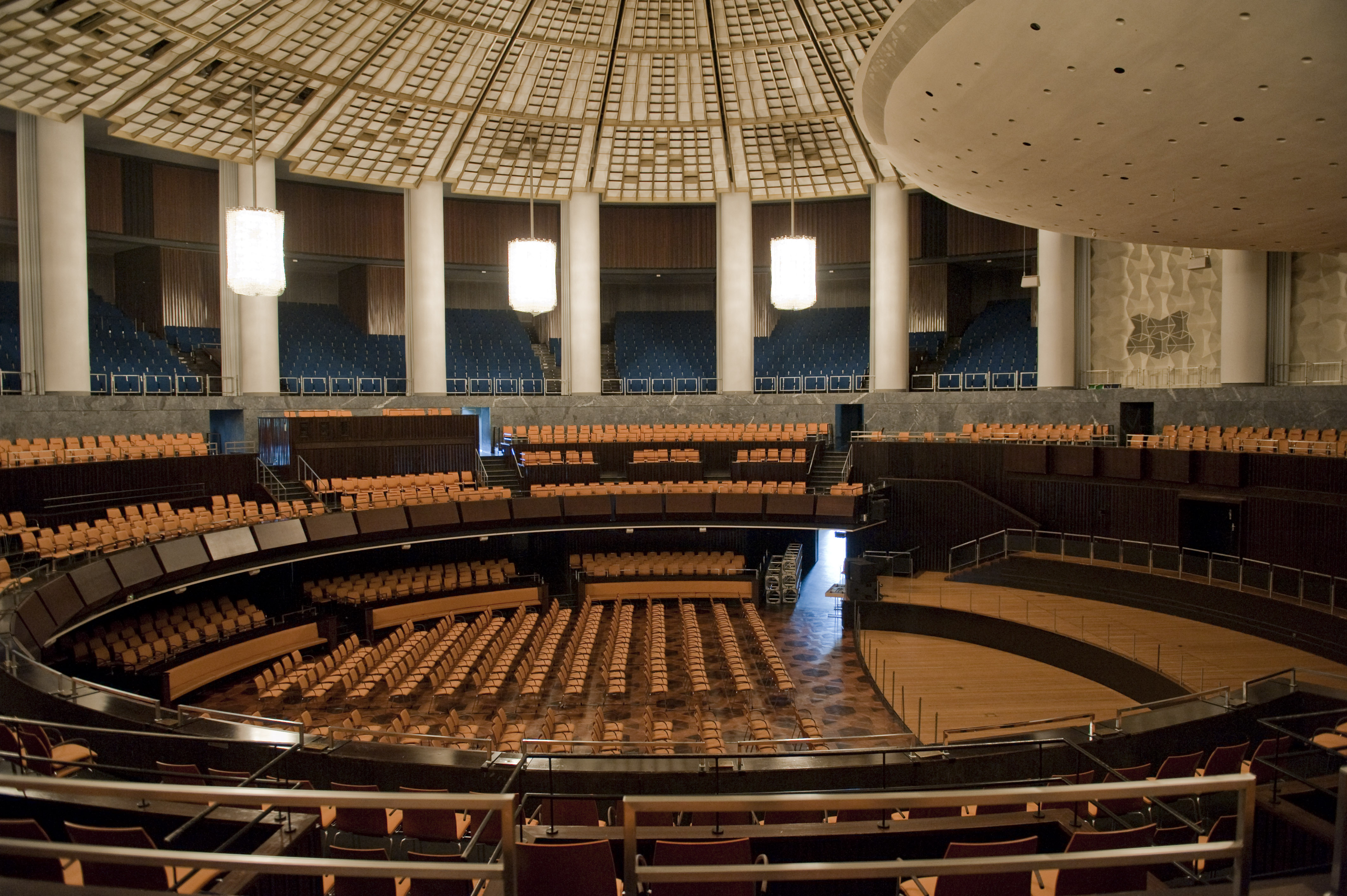
Interior of the Kuppelsaal, 2010

== Location ==
The Stadthalle is located in the district Zoo, near the Eilenriede and the Eilenriedestadion, right next to the Stadtpark Hannover with a Japanese tea garden and a rose garden. It is connected to the highway system by Messeschnellweg, and can be reached by bus.

== History ==
The Stadthalle was designed by architects Paul Bonatz, a young architect from Stuttgart, and his partner Friedrich Eugen Scholer, who won a competition in 1910. It was built from 1912 to 1914. The domed hall in neoclassical style was inspired by the Pantheon in Rome. It was conceived as a multi-functional municipal hall for concerts, congresses and conventions, with a rising podium for 80 players and 400 to 600 singers. Seating an audience of 3,600, it is the largest hall for classical music in Germany by capacity. The hall was opened in 1914 with a large Musikfest. It proved an impressive space (beeindruckendes Raumerlebnis), but had problematic acoustics.

The hall was severely damaged by bombing in World War II. It was restored slightly altered, supervised by the original architect Bonatz. Changes were made to the roof and the tholobate. After the founding of Lower Saxony in 1946, with the city to be the state capital, the state parliament met there temporarily from 1947 until the new building in the Leineschloss was completed in 1961.

The Kuppelsaal was restored again from 2015 to January 2016, including technical modernisation, more comfortable seating and improved acoustics.
