= Historisches Museum Hannover =

Museum in Hanover, Germany

Hanover Historical Museum
- Historisches Museum Hannover
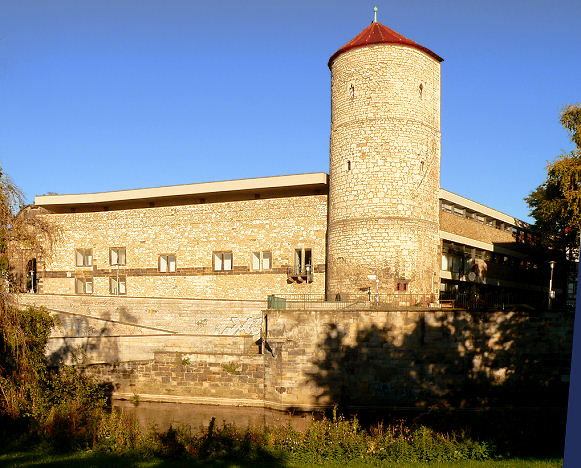
- The museum, including remnants of the city's medieval city wall and in particular the Beguine Tower, is located at the High Bank on the eastern side of the Leine river.
- The museum is situated in the old town (●), shown here within the approximate location of the former 13th-century city wall within the 17th-century inner bastion (●).
- Established: 1903; 123 years ago
- Location: Hanover, Lower Saxony, Germany
- Coordinates: 52°22′18″N 9°43′56″E
- Type: Historical museum
- Director: Thomas Schwark
- Website: historisches-museum.hannover.de

Hanover Historical Museum (German: Historisches Museum Hannover) is an historical museum situated in Hanover, the capital of Lower Saxony, Germany. The museum was founded in 1903 as the Homeland Museum of the City of Hanover (Vaterländisches Museum der Stadt Hannover). Its collections are related to the history of the city, the history of the House of Guelf, and of the state of Lower Saxony.

== History ==
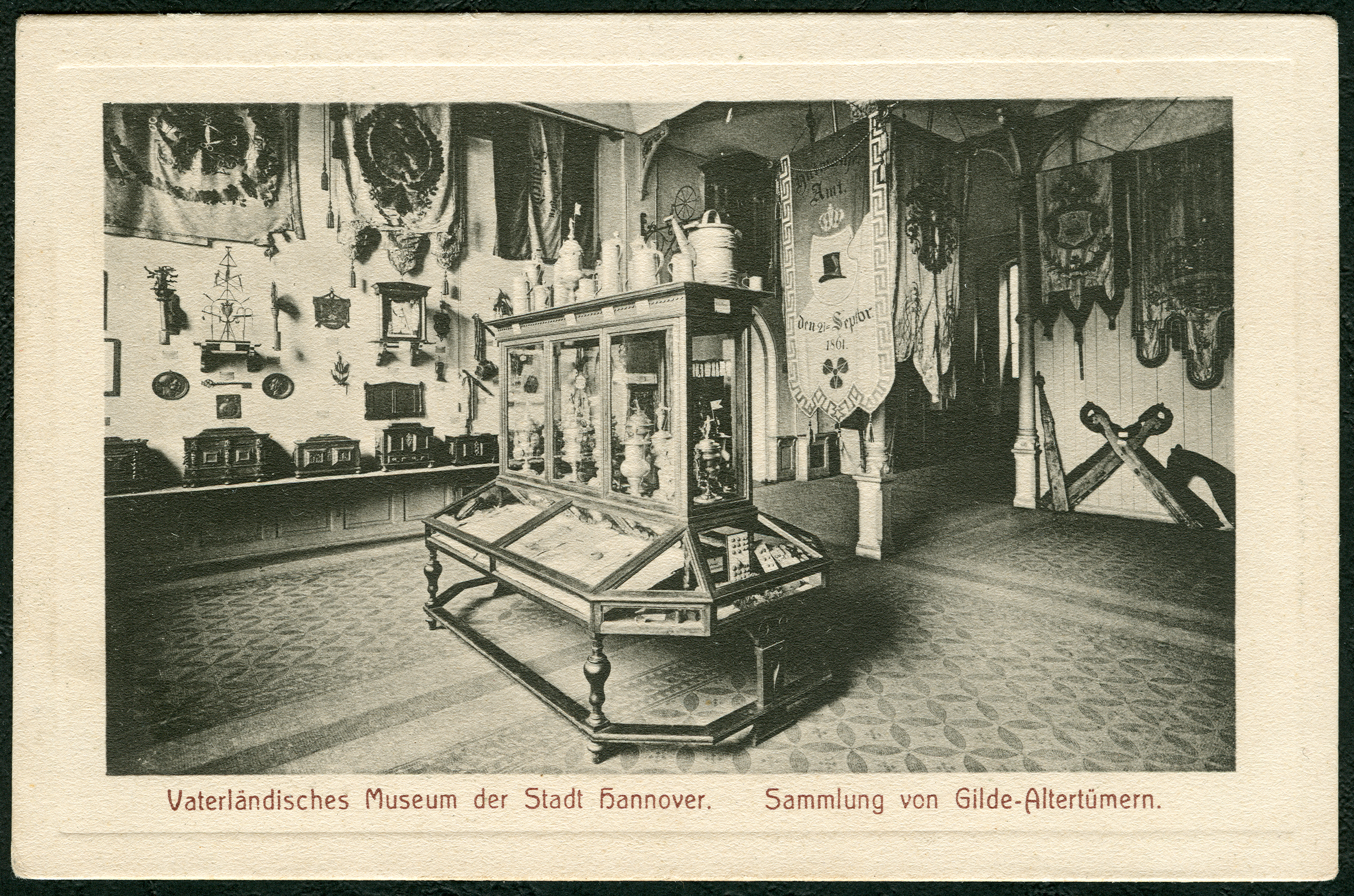
Postcard from 1907 by Georg Alpers junior titled "Homeland Museum of the City of Hanover (Vaterländisches Museum der Stadt Hannover). Collection of Guild antiquities."

The museum, operated by the City of Hanover, opened on 26 April 1903 as Homeland Museum of the City of Hanover (Vaterländisches Museum der Stadt Hannover) in the Cumberland Gallery. The founding took place on the initiative of the Heritage Society of Lower Saxony, before being renamed to Lower Saxon Folklore Museum (Niedersächsisches Volkstumsmuseum) in 1937. Destroyed in 1943 during the aerial bombings of World War II, provisional reconstruction began in 1950, at which time it adopted the temporary name of Lower Saxon Homeland Museum (Niedersächsisches Heimatmuseum). In 1966 the museum opened with its present name in a new building designed by the architect Dieter Oesterlen. The Association of the Friends of the Historical Museum (Verein der Freunde des Historischen Museums) supports the work of the museum both materially and non-materially.

In 2017, the museum's permanent exhibition, conceived in 1993, was redesigned. In 2020, at the start of the lockdowns combating the global COVID-19 pandemic, the museum closed for renovations that were initially projected to take three years. As of December 2023, renovation plans that seek a reopening sometime between 2028 and 2030 are projected to be presented for approval in 2024 and commencement of renovation works at the start of 2025. Until it reopens the museum intends to exhibit externally, rebranding itself as an outside museum (Museum außer Haus) and history in motion (Geschichte unterwegs).

== Location ==
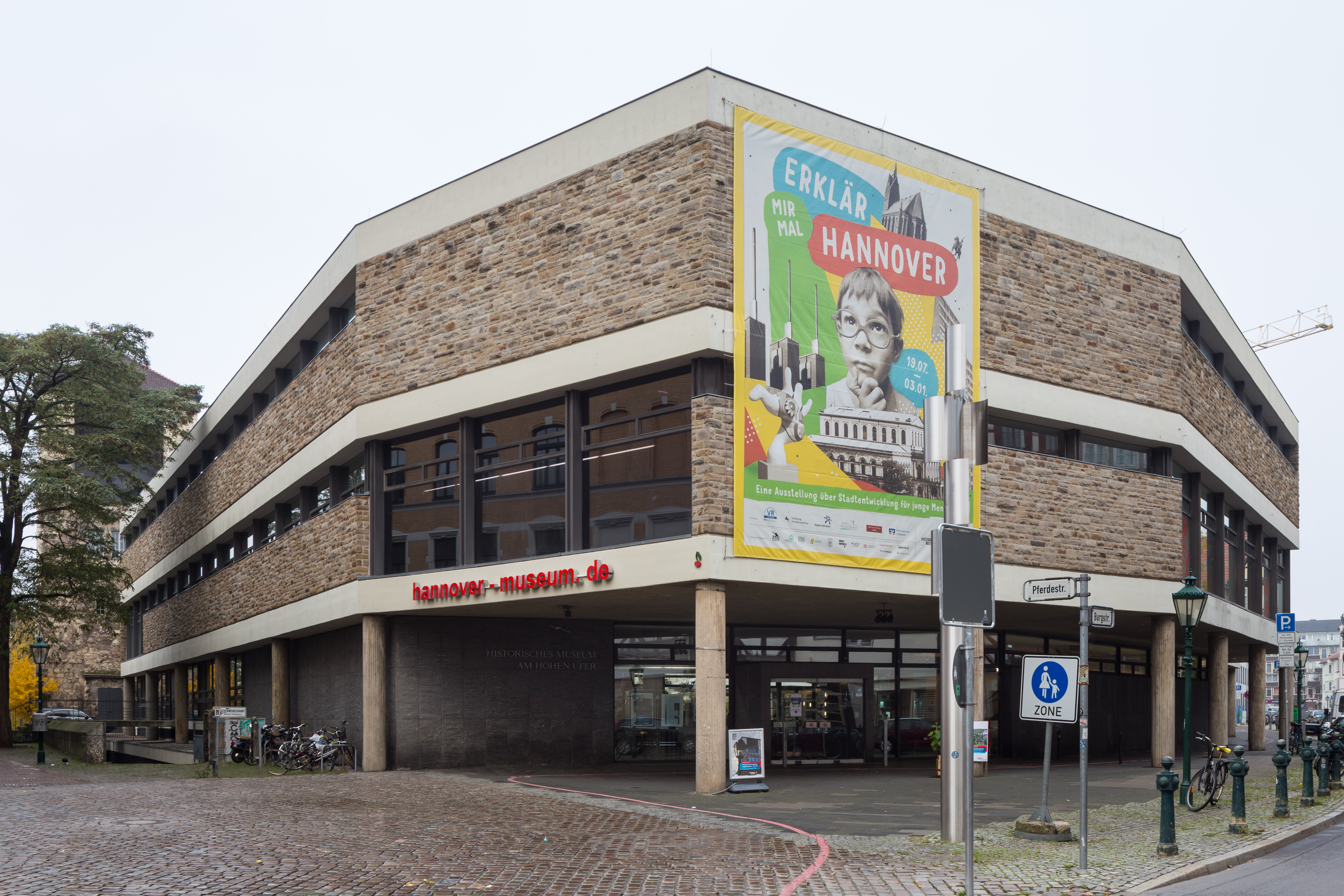
The museum from the city

The headquarters of the museum is located at the High Bank on the Leine river, where the establishment of the medieval settlement of Hanover in the 11th century is thought to have occurred near a Leine crossing of the road between Hildesheim and Bremen that was secured here by a fiefdom. Even if the derivation of the city's name "Hanovere" or "Honovere" from "High Bank" is not correct, as contemporary research suggests, the museum nevertheless has a unique location in the area of the city's origin.

The Beguine Tower integrated into the museum is the last completely preserved tower of the medieval fortifications of Hannover. The museum building also incorporates a high stone wall of the ducal armoury, built between 1643 and 1649, and remnants of the city wall facing the High Bank. Hanover's historic old town within which the museum is situated was completely destroyed in World War II, with Castle Street (Burgstrasse) featuring numerous half-timbered houses reconstructed in the 1960s, as well as the Leibniz House restored in the 1980s at the Timber Market. In 2013, discovery of significant medieval finds during construction work on a neighbouring plot led to a three-months archaeological investigation in the area.

== Building ==
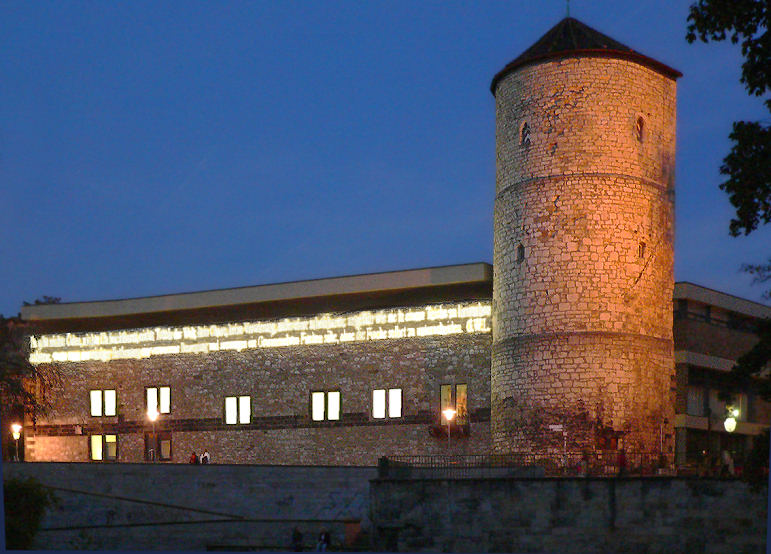
Illuminated museum at night

Between 1964 and 1967 the contemporary museum building was constructed on the site of a block of flats destroyed during the war. Incorporating the Beguine Tower and remnants of the ducal armoury, the building by architect Dieter Oesterlen features a polygonal footprint around a pentagonal inner courtyard. Its striking façade of three storeys with alternating broad sandstone surfaces and narrow bands of windows has a staggered appearance when seen from its north along Castle Street. It was renovated in 1991, and in 2002 the department of regional history on the ground floor and a part of the city history on the first floor were redesigned.

A light installation dating to the year 2000 by the American conceptual artist Joseph Kosuth of an illuminated quotation by Gottfried Wilhelm Leibniz on the building exterior facing the Leine reads:

There is no desert, nothing infertile, nothing dead in the world, no chaos, no confusion, except an apparent one, something like what you would see in a pond if you saw a confused movement and a swarm of fish from some distance, without distinguishing the fish themselves

— Gottfried Wilhelm Leibniz

== Collections ==
=== Departments ===
The museum is divided into four departments:

- From principality to kingdom (Vom Fürstentum zum Königreich), showing the development from the Principality of Calenberg around 1600 to the end of the Kingdom of Hanover in 1866
- From market village to trade fair city (Vom Marktflecken zur Messestadt), showing how Hanover developed over 750 years from a settlement on the high banks (Low German: to den hogen overen) to a city
- Life in the country (Leben auf dem Lande), showing how the rural population of Lower Saxony lived from the 17th to the 20th century
- Museum Herrenhausen Palace (Museum Schloss Herrenhausen), located at Schloss Herrenhausen and opened in May 2013 as a new department

=== Photo archives ===
The museum has one of the largest photo archives in Germany, holding around one million historical photographs for consultation and acquisition of reproductions. According to photo heritage, the museum has a stock of more than five million photos.

=== Decorations ===
The politician and banker August Basse donated the so-called Finkam Collection of decorations to the museum.

=== Vehicles ===
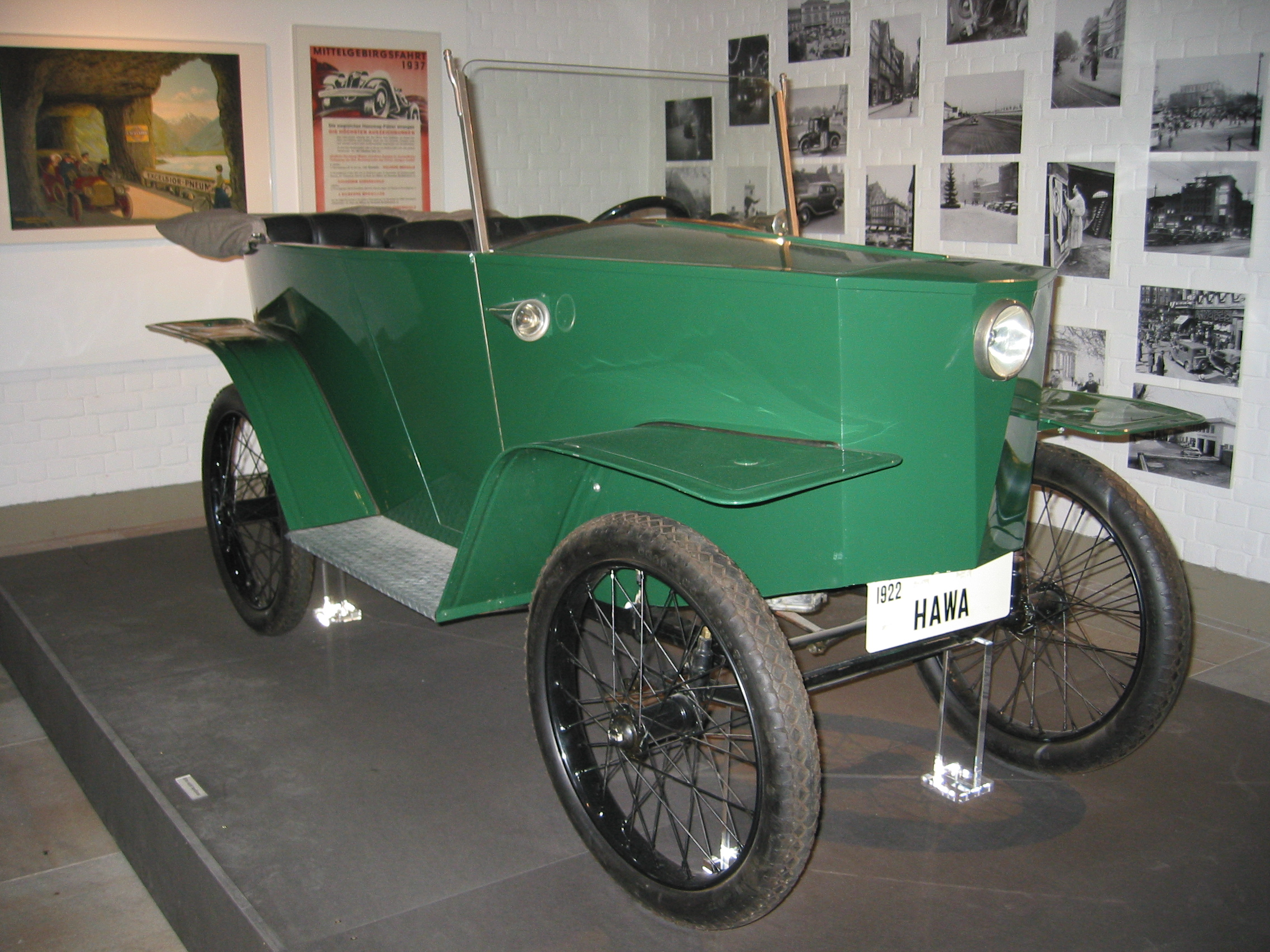
Hawa 40 Volt Elektro-Kleinwagen from 1921–1923

Some vintage vehicles are on display in the museum, such as a Hawa 40 Volt Elektro-Kleinwagen from the Hannoversche Waggonfabrik.

== People ==
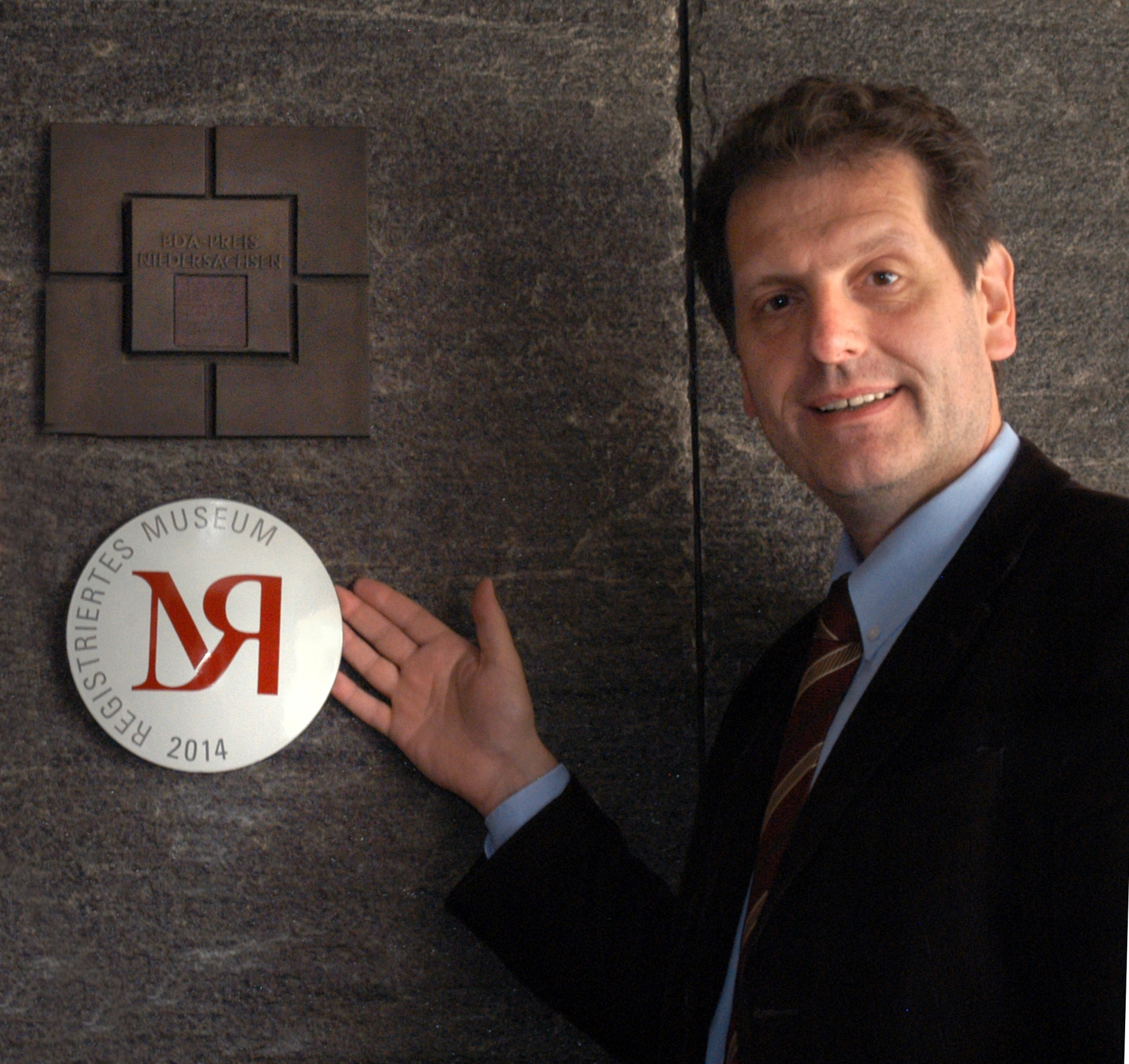
Director Thomas Schwark with the plates of the BDA-Preis Niedersachsen and the Museumsregistrierung

From 1928 to 1945, Wilhelm Peßler was director of the Vaterländisches Museum in Hanover. Waldemar R. Röhrbein was director from 1976 to 1997, succeeded by Thomas Schwark.

== General references ==
- Oesterlen, Dieter, ed. (1992). "Historisches Museum Hannover". Bauten und Texte 1946–1991 (in German). Tübingen: Wasmuth: 138–147. ISBN 3-8030-0153-6. OCLC 31045788.
- Röhrbein, Waldemar R. (1978). "Historisches Museum am Hohen Ufer 1903 – 1978: Aus 75 Jahren Museumsgeschichte". Hannoversche Geschichtsblätter (in German). Neue Folge 32: 3–60. ISSN 0342-1104. OCLC 231043632.
- Plath, Helmut; Röhrbein, Waldemar R. (1978). Fünfundsiebzig Jahre Historisches Museum am Hohen Ufer, Hannover: 1903–1978 (in German). Hannover: Historisches Museum am Hohen Ufer. OCLC 633241048.
- Plath, Helmut (1970). Stadtgeschichtliche Abteilung. Abteilungskataloge des Historischen Museums am Hohen Ufer, Hannover (in German). Hannover: Historischen Museums am Hohen Ufer. OCLC 72945254.
- "Mit Geschichte in die Zukunft". Festschrift zum 25-jährigen Bestehen der Freunde des Historischen Museums. Hannover. 2005.
- Knocke, Helmut; Thielen, Hugo (1994). "Pferdestraße 6". In Dirk Böttcher; Klaus Mlynek (eds.). Hannover: Kunst- und Kultur-Lexikon (in German). Hanover: Schäfer. pp. 178–180. ISBN 3-88746-313-7. OCLC 258561223. OL 26769740M. Wikidata Q1576243.
