= Stadtarchiv Hannover =

Municipal archive

Coordinates: 52.3679°N 9.7534°E

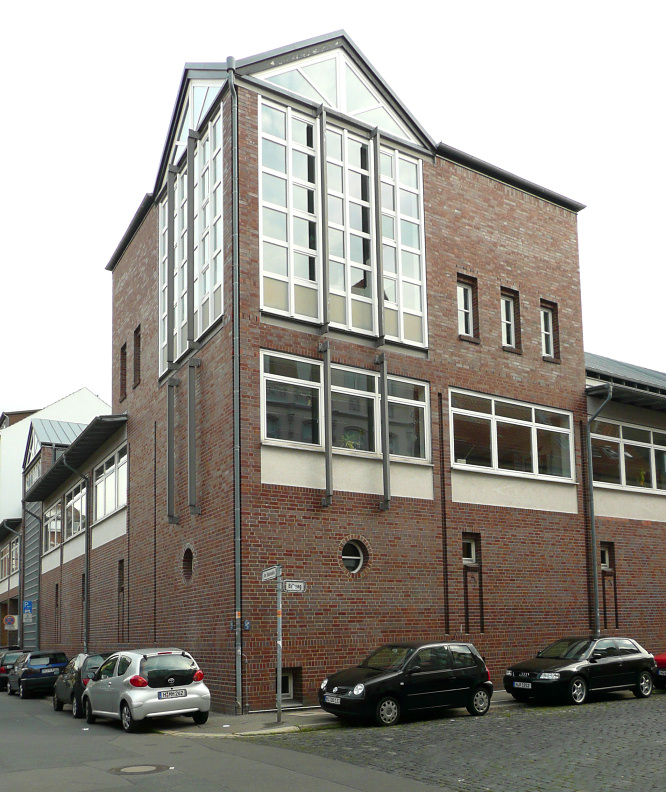
The Stadtarchiv Hannover

The Stadtarchiv Hannover is the municipal archive of the German city of Hannover, the capital of Lower Saxony. Originating before 1300 and still with strong medieval holdings, it holds the collected documents produced by the mayor, the city council and administration. Its earliest surviving document dates to 1241, and the only pre-modern gap in its records results from the Knochenhauer-Amtshaus-fire of 1428. The catalogue was stored offsite during World War II and survived, although building registry documents were destroyed by bombing in 1943. A flash flood in 1946 also destroyed 19th-century documents.
