= Dieter Oesterlen =

German architect

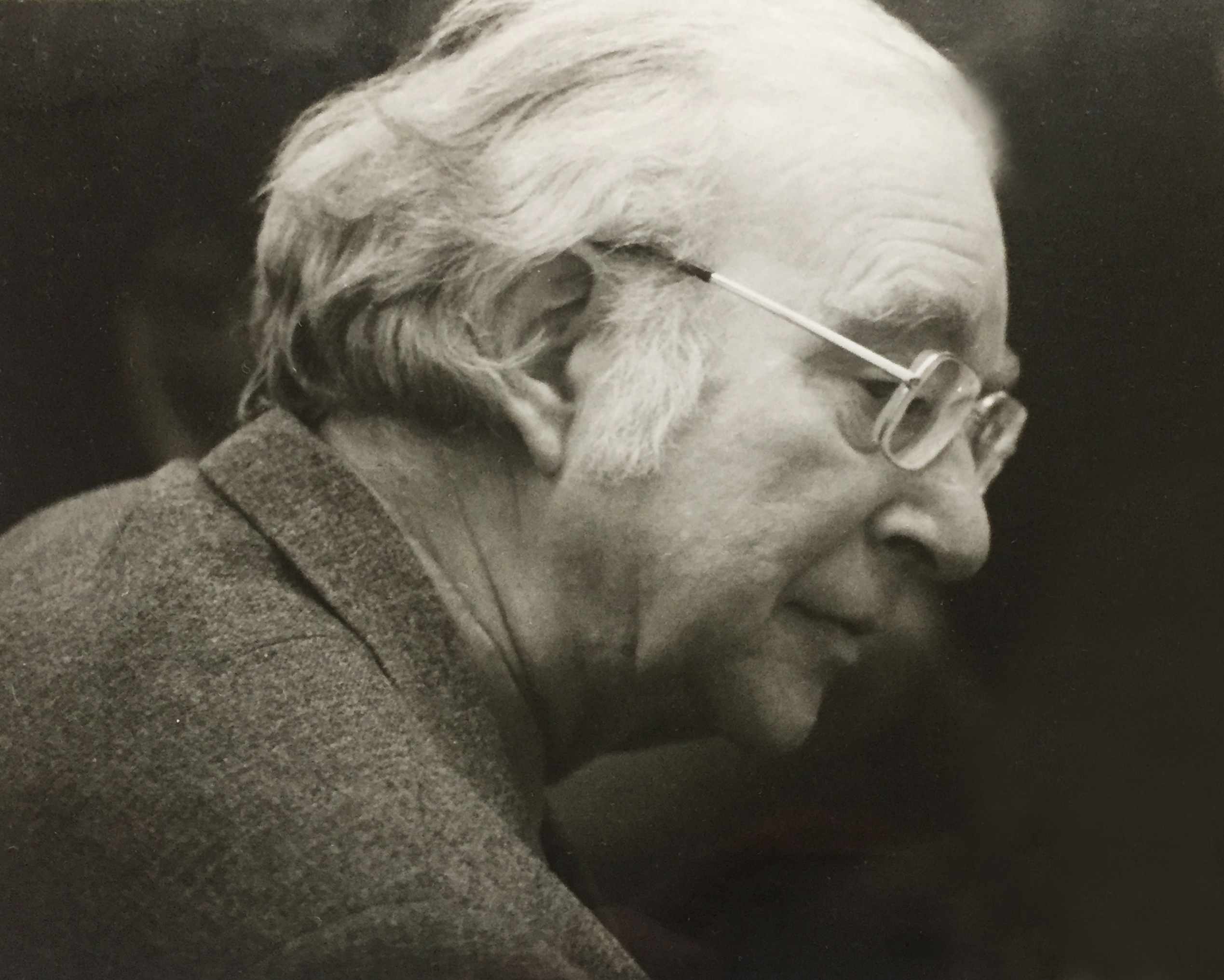
Oesterlen in 1975

Dieter Oesterlen (April 5, 1911 – April 6, 1994) was a German architect. He re-built the Leineschloss, the Marktkirche, and the opera house all in Hanover after the destruction of World War II.

Oesterlen's father was the chief engineer of a turbine factory in Heidenheim. His family left the town for Berlin during World War I. From Berlin they moved again to Hanover after his father was appointed professor of turbine technology at the local technical college. The foundations to Oesterlen's training in architecture began here. He regularly visited exhibitions at the Kestner Society. He attended evening classes in freehand drawing at the School of Applied Arts. As a young man he worked in some unorthodox places. For instance, after completing high school he worked, as part of his practical requirements, at the construction site of the Oder-Dam as a carpenter. He was a great observer and absorbed much by merely going from place to place. Before he began a formal training as an architect he was already an informal student of architecture. The strict objectivity of the Bauhaus building in Dessau, which Oesterlen visited in the years before he started his architectural degree, made a lasting impression on him.

== Education ==
In 1930 Oesterlen enrolled at the University of Stuttgart, where he trained under Paul Schmitthenner. The latter's conservative architectural philosophy, which later went on to be known as the Stuttgart School, was as far removed from the Bauhaus ideals as it could be. This did create a dilemma for Oesterlen. But he was also drawn to Schmitthenner's philosophy of looking at a building's design and detail as a homogeneous whole.

== Early career ==
After graduating from university, Oesterlen worked for a year at Hugo Keuerleber in Stuttgart. Then he enrolled at the Institute of Technology in Berlin-Charlottenburg. There he initially studied with Heinrich Tessenow, but changed a semester later to learning from Poelzig, who was at that time regarded as the best teacher of architecture in the Weimar Republic. His work was part of the architecture event in the art competition at the 1936 Summer Olympics.

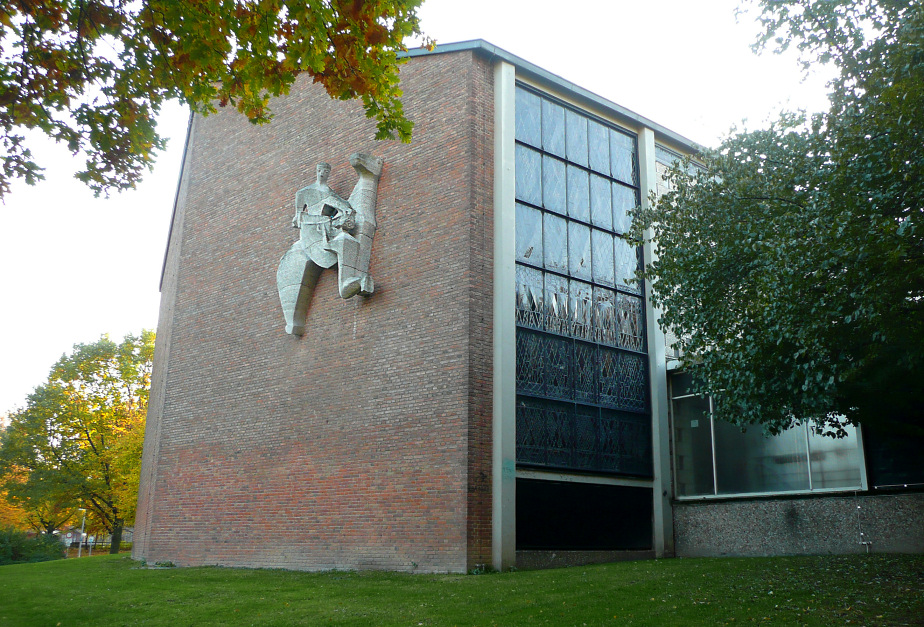
One of Oesterlen's designs

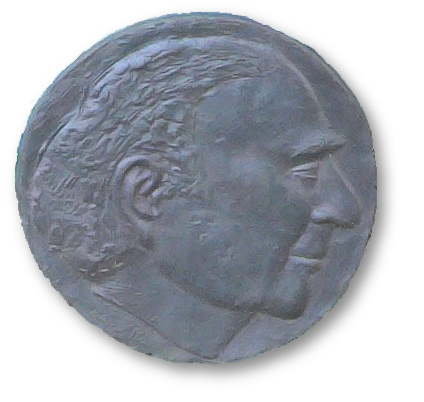
Plaque with Oesterlen's face

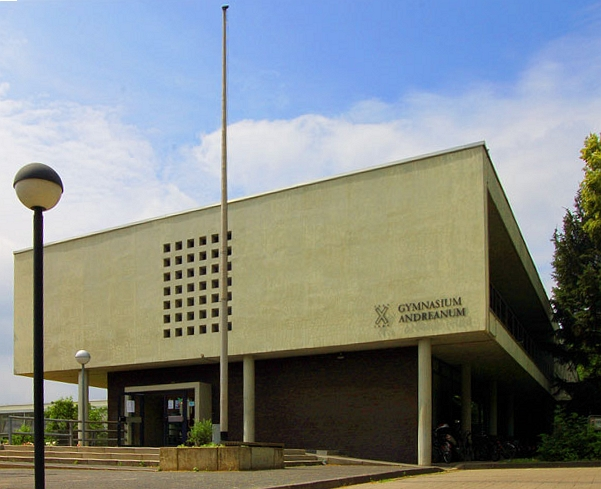
Gymnasium designed by Oesterlen
