= Klaus Mlynek =

German scientific archivist and historian

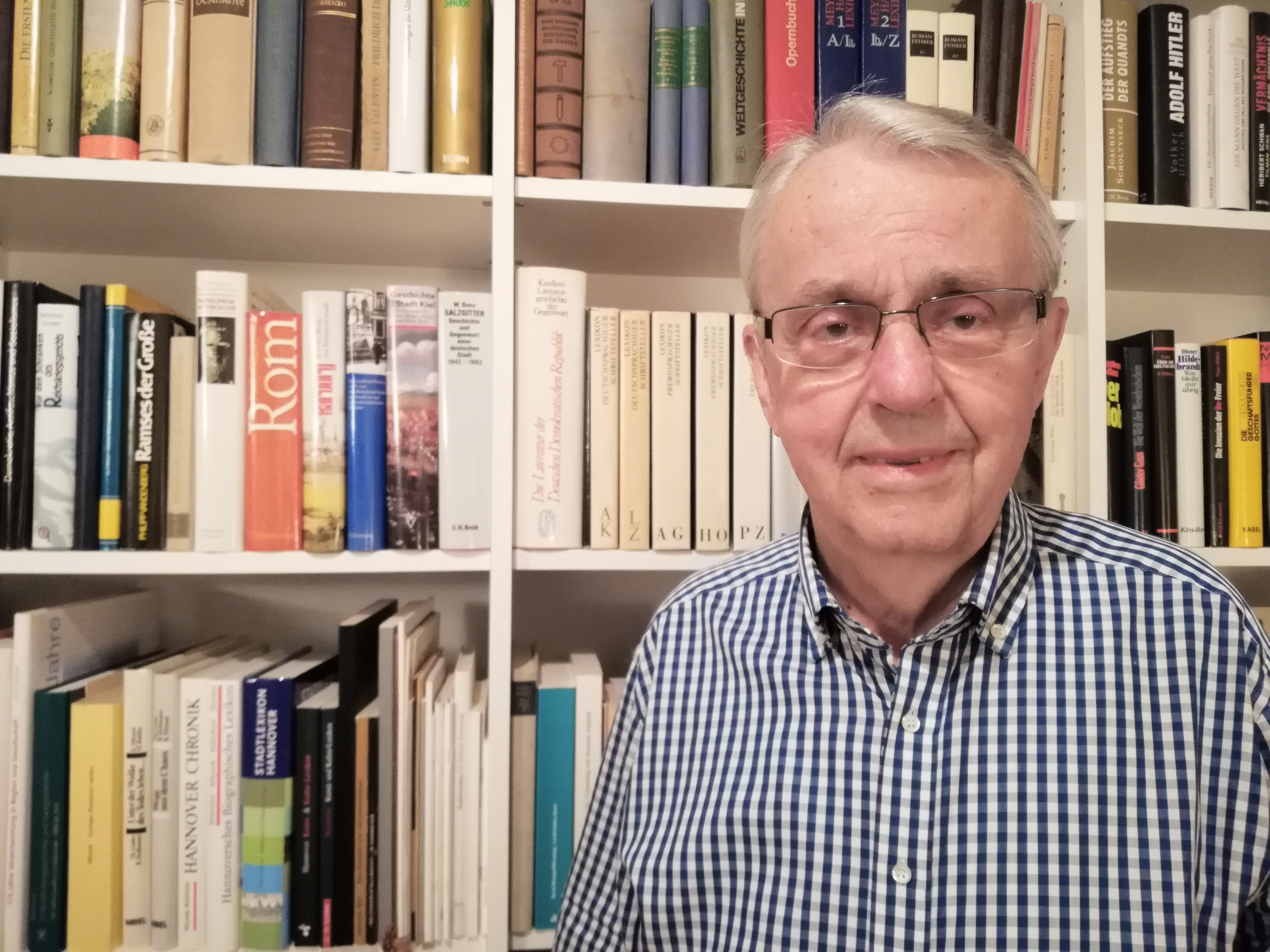
Klaus Mlynek in 2018

Klaus Mlynek (born 16 January 1936) is a German historian and scientific archivist, a former director of the City of Hanover Archive, and one of the editors and authors of the Hannover City Lexicon, an encyclopedia of Hanover.

== Life ==
Born in Poznań, Poland, Mlynek studied history, history of Christianity and history of law at the University of Jena and archival science at the Institute of Archival Science, completing the state examination (Staatsexamen) in 1957. He received his scientific archivist diploma the following year, and his doctorate in 1961.

After working at the German Central Archive and the archive of the German Academy of Sciences at Berlin, both in East Germany, Mlynek was director of the archives of Hanover in West Germany from 1977 until his retirement in 1997. His research focused on aspects of Hanover's urban history.

== Selected publications ==
Notably, Mlynek worked on a number of publications with Waldemar R. Röhrbein, the director of the Hanover Historical Museum from 1976 to 1997.

- Klaus Mlynek; Waldemar R. Röhrbein (1991). Klaus Mlynek; Waldemar R. Röhrbein (eds.). Hanover Chronicle: from the Beginnings to the Present – Numbers, Dates and Facts (PDF) (in German). Hanover: Schlütersche Verlagsgesellschaft. ISBN 978-3-87706-319-4. LCCN 91143056. OCLC 24468337. OL 1605811M. Wikidata Q1576234.
- Klaus Mlynek; Helmut Plath; Siegfried Müller; Carl-Hans Hauptmeyer (1992). Klaus Mlynek; Waldemar R. Röhrbein (eds.). History of the City of Hanover: Von den Anfängen bis zum Beginn des 19. Jahrhunderts (in German). Vol. 1. Hanover: Schlütersche Verlagsgesellschaft. ISBN 978-3-87706-351-4. OCLC 722320314. OL 1312053M. Wikidata Q124134715.
- Dieter Brosius; Klaus Mlynek; Waldemar R. Röhrbein (1994). Klaus Mlynek; Waldemar R. Röhrbein (eds.). History of the City of Hanover (in German). Vol. 2. Hanover: Schlütersche Verlagsgesellschaft. ISBN 978-3-87706-364-4. OCLC 165119758. OL 1312053M. Wikidata Q124134716.

Mlynek worked on further publications after his retirement in 1997:

- Gerd Heuvel; Helmut Knocke; Karl-Friedrich Oppermann; et al. (2002). Dirk Böttcher; Klaus Mlynek; Waldemar R. Röhrbein; Hugo Thielen (eds.). Hannoversches Biographisches Lexikon: Von den Anfängen bis in die Gegenwart (in German). Hanover: Schlütersche Verlagsgesellschaft. ISBN 978-3-87706-706-2. LCCN 2002550672. OCLC 231977507. OL 3663458M. Wikidata Q1301650.
- Klaus Mlynek; Waldemar R. Röhrbein, eds. (2009), Hannover City Lexicon. From the beginnings into the present (in German), Hanover: Schlütersche Verlagsgesellschaft, OCLC 458691668, OL 45212542M, Wikidata Q2327579
