= Waldemar R. Röhrbein =

German historian

- Born: 9 September 1935; Hanover, Germany
- Died: 5 October 2014 (aged 79); Emden, Germany
- Education: University of Göttingen; University of Hamburg
- Occupations: Historian; Museum director
- Organizations: Städtisches Museum Göttingen; Historisches Museum Hannover

Waldemar R. Röhrbein (9 September 1935 – 5 October 2014) was a German historian. He worked as a museum director in Lower Saxony, his last post being from 1976 to 1997 at the Historisches Museum Hannover, and was president of the Homeland Federation of Lower Sachsony. He contributed to encyclopedias about Hanover's history and culture.

== Life ==
Born in Hanover, Röhrbein grew up in rural Letter. He studied history, English language and literature, education and philosophy at the universities of Göttingen and Hamburg. In the winter semester 1964/65 he was awarded his doctorate at the University of Göttingen with his thesis Hamburg und der hannoversche Verfassungskonflikt, 1837–1840. In 1965 he joined the museum service.

In 1967, Röhrbein became director of the Städtisches Museum Göttingen, the municipal museum of Göttingen. From 1976 up to his retirement in 1997, he was director of the Historisches Museum Hannover, the historical museum of Hanover, the capital of Lower Saxony. He managed to make the museum attractive to visitors, including pedagogical efforts to reach children. His creed was that visitors have to see what the past has to do with their own lives ("Die Besucher müssen sehen, was die Vergangenheit mit ihrem eigenen Leben zu tun hat"). He achieved national recognition when the museum became one of the first to hold large historical exhibitions dedicated to specific topics, such as Nazi seizure of power, Kristallnacht, and the bombing of the city.

From 1995 to 1997 he also directed the Museum August Kestner. From 1986 to 2001 and again since April 2010, he was Deputy Chairman of the Heimatbund Niedersachsen. From 1999 to 2004 he was president of Niedersächsischer Heimatbund.

Röhrbein was on the advisory board of the Historischer Verein für Niedersachsen. He was awarded the Niedersächsischer Verdienstorden, first class, in 2004.

After he retired, Röhrbein lived in Emden until his death in 2014 at the age of 79.

== Publications ==
Röhrbein published on the history of Göttingen and Hannover and of Lower Saxony, and also on museums and the local history. Especially together with Klaus Mlynek, the long-time director of the Stadtarchiv Hannover, he was both editor and author of:

- 1986: Der Maschsee in Hannover. Seine Entstehung und Geschichte. ed. by Röhrbein, with contributions by Felix zur Nedden, Röhrbein, Mlynek, Dieter Tasch, Kaspar Klaffke, Ernst August von der Haar and Peter K.-W. Meyer, Hanover: Schlütersche Verlagsanstalt, 1986, ISBN 978-3-87706-046-9 and ISBN 3-87706-046-3; Table of contents
- Klaus Mlynek; Waldemar R. Röhrbein (1991). Klaus Mlynek; Waldemar R. Röhrbein (eds.). Hanover Chronicle: from the Beginnings to the Present – Numbers, Dates and Facts (PDF) (in German). Hanover: Schlütersche Verlagsgesellschaft. ISBN 978-3-87706-319-4. LCCN 91143056. OCLC 24468337. OL 1605811M. Wikidata Q1576234.
- Klaus Mlynek; Helmut Plath; Siegfried Müller; Carl-Hans Hauptmeyer (1992). Klaus Mlynek; Waldemar R. Röhrbein (eds.). History of the City of Hanover: Von den Anfängen bis zum Beginn des 19. Jahrhunderts (in German). Vol. 1. Hanover: Schlütersche Verlagsgesellschaft. ISBN 978-3-87706-351-4. OCLC 722320314. OL 1312053M. Wikidata Q124134715.
- Dieter Brosius; Klaus Mlynek; Waldemar R. Röhrbein (1994). Klaus Mlynek; Waldemar R. Röhrbein (eds.). History of the City of Hanover (in German). Vol. 2. Hanover: Schlütersche Verlagsgesellschaft. ISBN 978-3-87706-364-4. OCLC 165119758. OL 1312053M. Wikidata Q124134716.
- Gerd Heuvel; Helmut Knocke; Karl-Friedrich Oppermann; et al. (2002). Dirk Böttcher; Klaus Mlynek; Waldemar R. Röhrbein; Hugo Thielen (eds.). Hannoversches Biographisches Lexikon: Von den Anfängen bis in die Gegenwart (in German). Hanover: Schlütersche Verlagsgesellschaft. ISBN 978-3-87706-706-2. LCCN 2002550672. OCLC 231977507. OL 3663458M. Wikidata Q1301650.
- Klaus Mlynek; Waldemar R. Röhrbein, eds. (2009), Hannover City Lexicon. From the beginnings into the present (in German), Hanover: Schlütersche Verlagsgesellschaft, OCLC 458691668, OL 45212542M, Wikidata Q2327579

Other works:

- Ausverkauf. the Marienburg Castle im Brennpunkt der Interessen. In Niedersachsen (Magazine for culture, history, home and nature since 1859), 2/2006, pp. 34–35. The same text can be found with minor changes under the title Im Brennpunkt: Die Marienburg, in Förderverein für die Stadtgeschichte von Springe e. V.: Springer Jahrbuch 2006, pp. 67–73, 125.
- Kleine Stadtgeschichte Hannovers. (chronological narrative, 192 pages), Regensburg: Pustet, 2012, ISBN 978-3-7917-2311-2
- with Hugo Thielen: Jüdische Persönlichkeiten in Hannovers Geschichte. Completely revised, extended and updated new edition, Hannover: Lutherisches Verlagshaus, 2013, ISBN 978-3-7859-1163-1

First in 1998 and revised in 2013, Röhrbein and Hugo Thielen wrote a book about Jewish personalities in the history of Hanover, Jüdische Persönlichkeiten in Hannovers Geschichte. It is organised as a history of the city, beginning in 1303, with a focus on the contributions of Jewish personalities, rather than individual biographies. Around hundred persons are described in some detail, including the principal violinist of the court orchestra, Joseph Joachim. A second edition appeared in 2013, in commemoration of 75 years since the November pogroms.
