= Dirk Böttcher =

German printer

Dirk Böttcher (13 October 1921 – 23 January 2011) was a German printer master, author and president of the association of Friends of the Historisches Museum Hannover.

== Life ==
Böttcher was born in Hanover. He passed his Abitur at the Ratsgymnasium and was drafted to the Wehrmacht, serving until 1945. In 1948 he became a master printing teacher and received the Betriebleiter diploma of the Meisterschule für Deutschlands Buchdrucker in Munich. Until 1964, Böttcher was head of a printing shop in São Paulo. He then was associate of the Carl Küster printing company in Hanover. He was a long-term president of the association of Friends of the Historisches Museum Hannover.

Böttcher died at age 89 in Hanover.

== Publications ==
Böttcher is co-author of the following works:

- Klaus Mlynek, Waldemar R. Röhrbein (ed.): Stadtlexikon Hannover. Von den Anfängen bis in die Gegenwart. Schlütersche Verlagsgesellschaft, Hanover 2009, ISBN 978-3-89993-662-9.
- Dirk Böttcher, Klaus Mlynek, Waldemar R. Röhrbein, Hugo Thielen (ed.): Hannoversches Biographisches Lexikon. Von den Anfängen bis in die Gegenwart. Schlütersche Verlagsgesellschaft, Hanover 2002, ISBN 3-87706-706-9.
- Helmut Knocke, Hugo Thielen (authors), Dirk Böttcher, Klaus Mlynek (ed.): Hannover. Kunst- und Kultur-Lexikon. Handbuch und Stadtführer. Schäfer, Hannover 1994, ISBN 3-88746-313-7.
- Helmut Knocke, Hugo Thielen (authors), Dirk Böttcher, Klaus Mlynek (ed.): Hannover. Kunst- und Kulturlexikon. Handbuch und Stadtführer. 4th, updated and extended edition. Zu Klampen, Springe 2007, ISBN 978-3-934920-53-8.
- Eine Druckerei im Wandel. Meine kleine Berufsgeschichte vornehmlich in der Carl-Küster-Druckerei von 1886. In Hannoversche Geschichtsblätter, Neue Folge 54, 2000, pp. 97–114.
