= Hugo Thielen =

German journalist (born 1946)

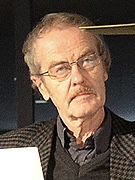
- Thielen in 2013
- Born: 1946 (age 79–80)
- Education: University of Bonn
- Occupations: Author; Editor
- Organizations: Schroedel Verlag; Zu Klampen Verlag; Lutherisches Verlagshaus

Hugo Thielen (born 1946) is a German freelance author and editor, who is focused on the history of Hanover, the capital of Lower Saxony, in a lexicon of the city, another one especially of its art and culture, and a third of biographies. He co-authored a book about Jewish personalities in Hanover's history.

== Life ==
Thielen studied German language and literature, philosophy and education at the University of Bonn from 1966, completing with the Staatsexamen in 1971. He has lived in Hanover from 1973, working as editor and author for various publishing houses. He worked for Schroedel Verlag, a publisher mainly of school readers, until 1981, for the Th. Schäfer Verlag until 1995, also for the Postskriptum Verlag, for Hirschgraben, a publisher of school readers in Frankfurt am Main, for Zu Klampen Verlag in Lüneburg and Springe, and for Lutherisches Verlagshaus. From 1983 to 1995 he was a freelance music critic for the Hannoversche Allgemeine Zeitung. He is head of a Verlagsbüro, an office for freelance writers.

== Publications ==
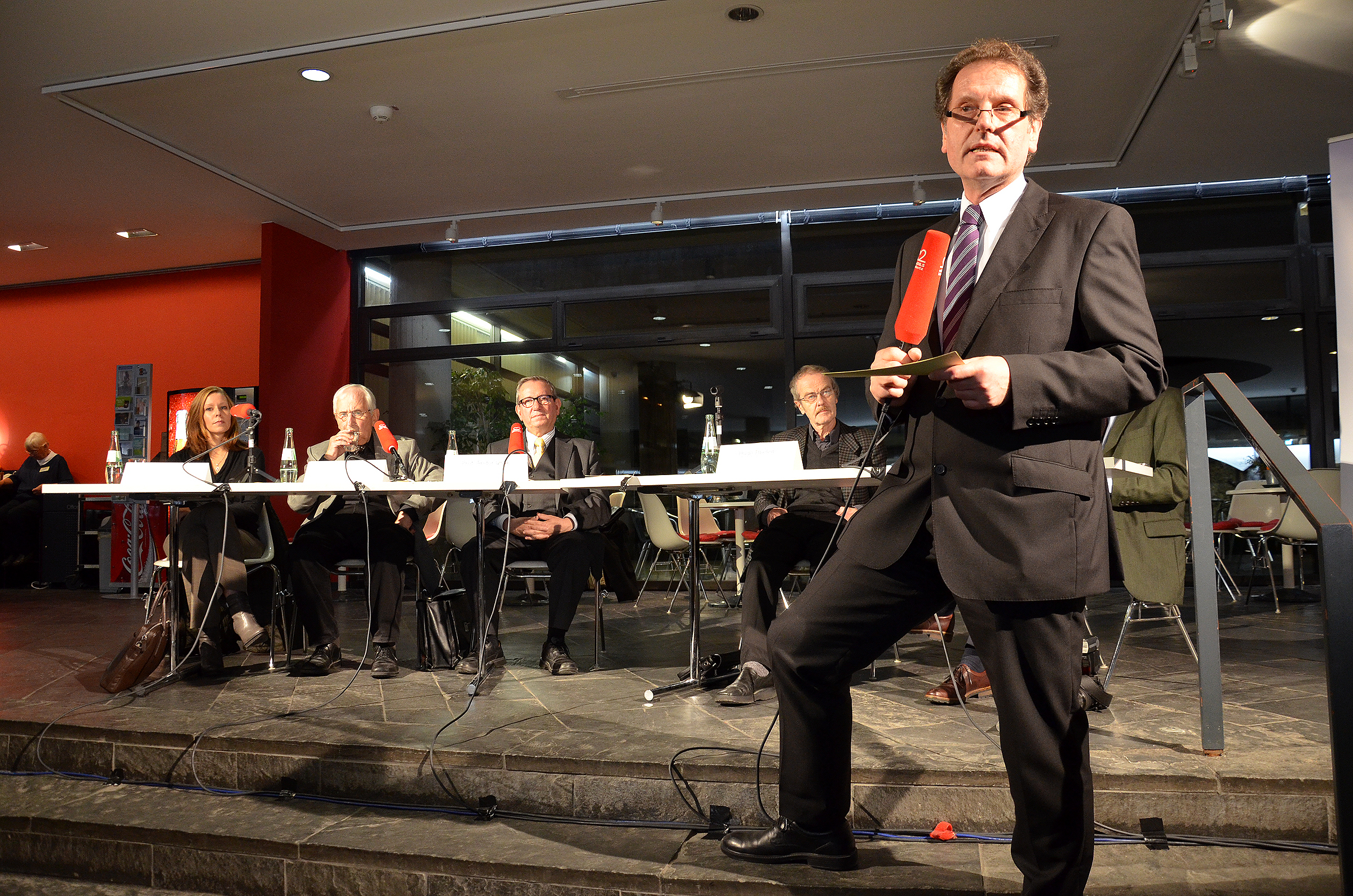
Hugo Thielen (fourth from left at the table) at the presentation of the book about Jewish personalities in 2013

Thielen is co-author (besides Helmut Knocke) of Hanover: Art and Cultural Lexicon, a lexicon of Hanover's art and culture, published in 1994 by Zu Klampen Verlag, with a 4th edition in 2007. He is co-editor, author and designer of the 2002 Hanover Biographic Lexicon,, and of the Hanover City Lexicon.

First in 1998, Thielen and Waldemar R. Röhrbein, the retired director of the Historisches Museum Hannover, wrote the book Jewish Personalities in Hanover's History (Jüdische Persönlichkeiten in Hannovers Geschichte). It is organised as a history of the city, beginning in 1303, with a focus on the contributions of Jewish personalities, rather than individual biographies. Around a hundred persons are described in some detail, including the principal violinist of the court orchestra, Joseph Joachim. A second edition, completely revised by Thielen, appeared in 2013, in memory of the November pogroms 75 years earlier.

- Helmut Knocke, Hugo Thielen: Hannover Kunst- und Kultur-Lexikon: Handbuch und Stadtführer. Ed: Dirk Böttcher, Klaus Mlynek, Zu Klampen Verlag 2007
- Dirk Böttcher, Klaus Mlynek, Waldemar R. Röhrbein (eds.): Hannoversches Biographisches Lexikon. Schlütersche Verlagsgesellschaft, Hanover 2002, ISBN 3-87706-706-9.
- Klaus Mlynek, Waldemar R. Röhrbein, Dirk Böttcher, Hugo Thielen (ed.): Stadt Lexikon Hannover. Von den Anfängen bis in die Gegenwart. Schlütersche Verlagsgesellschaft, Hannover 2009, ISBN 978-3-89993-662-9.
- Waldemar R. Röhrbein, Hugo Thielen: Jüdische Persönlichkeiten in Hannovers Geschichte, completely revised, extended and updated new edition, Hannover: Lutherisches Verlagshaus, 2013, ISBN 978-3-7859-1163-1
