= Helmut Knocke =

German architecture historian and author (born 1953)

Helmut Knocke (born 1953) is a German architecture historian and author.

== Life ==
Hemut Knocke studied architecture, with a special focus on the history of building, at the Leibniz University Hannover (LUH) in his home city, Hannover, graduating in 1983. He has worked for the Cultural heritage inventarisation department where the focus of his work was on the built and documentary legacies of the architects Georg Ludwig Friedrich Laves (1788–1864) and Rudolf Hillebrecht (1910–1999). He also involved himself in research projects at the Institute for Arts and Buildings History (German: Institut für Bau- und Kunstgeschichte) at LUH.

Knocke is co-author, together with Hugo Thielen, of the (Hannover Kunst- und Kultur-Lexikon), of which an expanded and updated fourth edition appeared in 2007, and which has become a standard work on various of its themes. He has contributed many of the entries in the Hannover Biographical lexicon (Hannoversches biographisches Lexikon), and to the Hannover City Lexicon (Stadtlexikon Hannover).
