= Open Grave, Hanover =

Tomb in Garden Cemetery in Hanover, Germany

Coordinates: 52.3695°N 9.7477°E

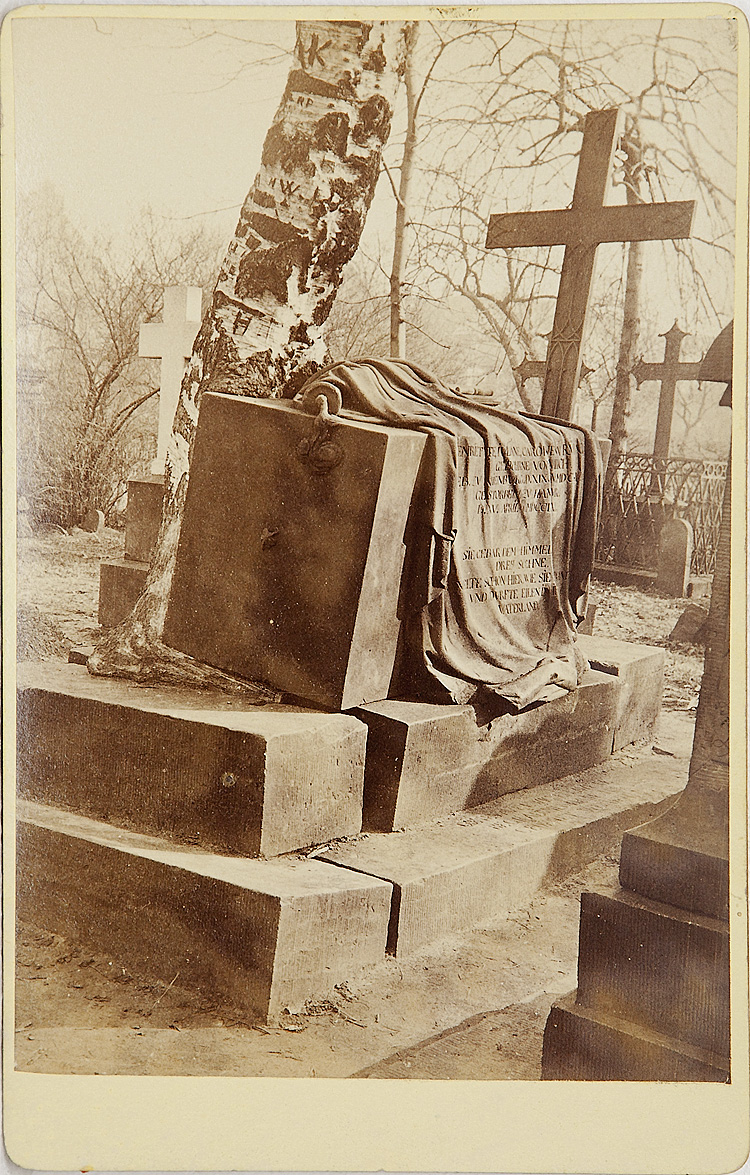
Early photograph of the Open Grave (c. 1880)

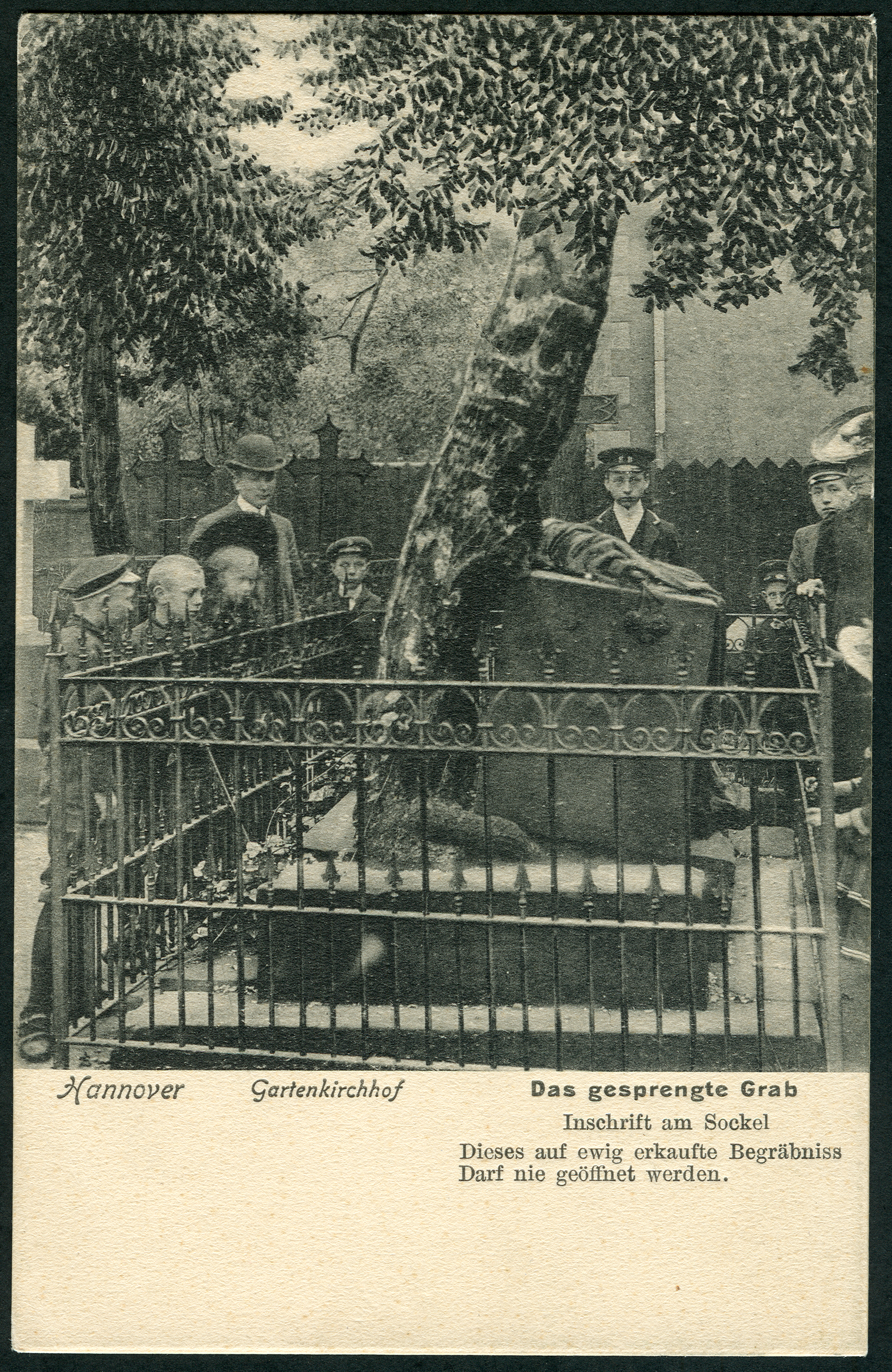
Photograph of the Open Grave (c. 1900)

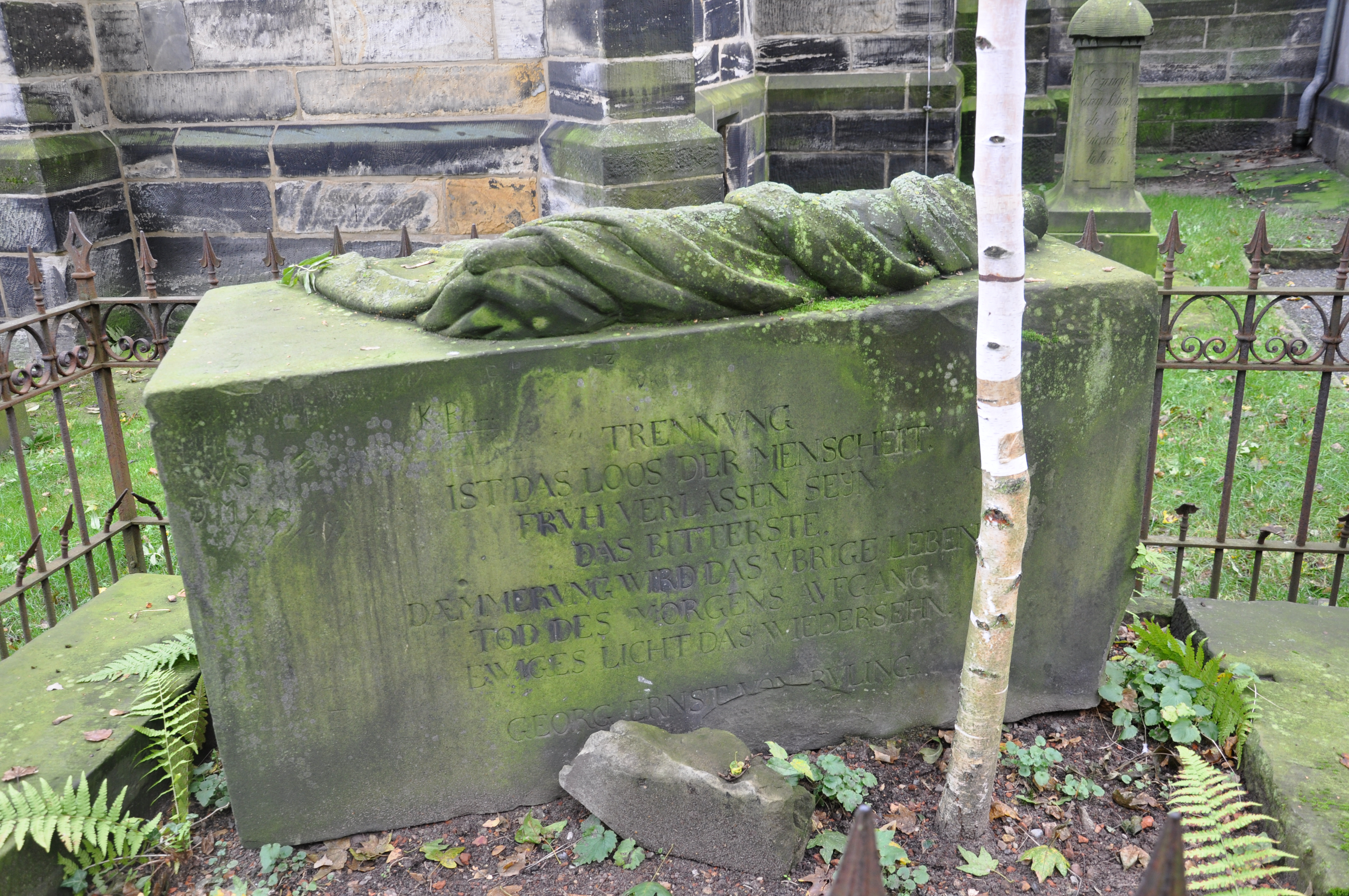
The Open Grave in 2014

The Open Grave (German: Geöffnetes Grab, literally Opened Grave) or Burst Grave (Gesprengtes Grab) is a tomb in Hanover in the Gartenfriedhof in the Warmbüchenviertel, near the Aegidientorplatz square. and one of the landmarks of the city of Hanover.

== History ==
The tomb is the grave of Henriette Juliane Caroline von Rüling (1756-1782), the wife of the Hanoverian state secretary Georg Ernst von Rüling and daughter of Georg Wilhelm von Willich, Vice President of the Higher Appeals Court. It bears the inscription "Dieses auf ewig gekaufte Begräbnis darf niemals geöffnet werden.", translated as, "This tomb bought for eternity may never be opened."

But over the years, a birch tree has sprouted in the plinth and, growing ever larger, lifted the heavy tombstone. Thus, despite the command of the grave's inscription, the tomb is now "open".

As a result, the tomb became an attraction in the nineteenth century, one among a number of "Open graves" appearing in horror stories. The tomb is therefore an early example of a tourist attraction and developed at a deeper level into one of the landmarks of the city of Hanover.

The story of the tomb forms the premise for the 1883 novel Das geöffnete Grab by Otto Warbeck.

Around 1900, the Open Grave began to appear regularly on postcards. Karl Friedrich Wunder, son of the first Hannoverian photographer, Friedrich Wunder, included a photograph of the grave in his 1905 book Hannover – 26 Ansichten nach künstlerischen Aufnahmen (Hanover: 26 artistic views).

At the beginning of 2010, a worker in the Grünkolonne (the parks and gardens agency of the city), without (advance) warning or even civic approval cut the tree down for "safety reasons", which naturally prompted much protests. In partnership with the state historic trust a "proper restoration of the historic tomb" has been announced.

== See also ==
- Tomb of Heinrich Bernhard Röhrs

== Bibliography ==
- Helmut Zimmermann. Hannoversche Porträts. Lebensbilder aus sieben Jahrhunderten, illustrated by Rainer Ossi Osswald, Harenberg, Hanover 1983, pp. 64–66.
- Karin Vera Schmidt. Warmbüchenviertel: Alte Birke am „offenen“ Grab ist tot / Die Stadt hat den bekannten Baum auf dem Gartenfriedhof im Warmbüchenviertel gefällt., online on Hannoversche Allgemeine Zeitung, 28 January 2010, last accessed 6 June 2013.
- Dirk Böttcher. Geöffnetes Grab, in: Stadtlexikon Hannover, p. 208.
- Landeshauptstadt Hannover. Der Gartenfriedhof, free booklet of the parks and gardens agency of Hanover in collaboration with the Hanover press office, December 1997, p. 22. (PDF Document online (1,23 MB; PDF))
- Otto Warbeck. Das geöffnete Grab, Novel, Hanover: Schlütersche Verlagsgesellschaft, 1883.
