= Arenhold =

Arenhold is a surname, likely of German origin. Notable people with the surname include:

- Ida Arenhold (1798–1863), German social welfare pioneer
- John Arenhold (1931–2017), South African cricketer
- Lüder Arenhold (1854–1915), German marine painter
