= Gartenfriedhof =

Cemetery in Hannover, Germany

Coordinates: 52°22′11″N 9°44′51″E

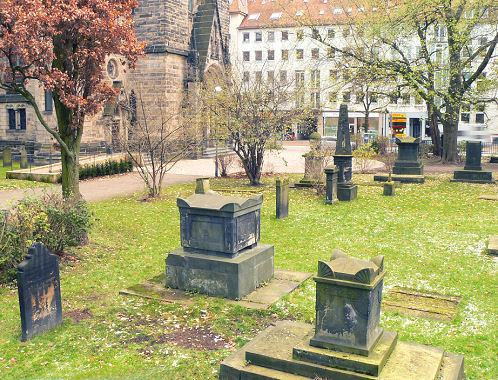
Garden Cemetery with the Garden Church at left and Marienstraße behind

The Garden Cemetery (German: Gartenfriedhof) is a cemetery in Hanover, Germany. It was created in 1741 and is located by the Garden Church built in 1749. The cemetery and the church are both named after the garden parish outside the former parish city walls in front of Aegidien Gate. The cemetery, which contains a number of classicising grave markers from the first half of the nineteenth century, was closed in 1864 with the establishment of the Stadtfriedhof Engesohde. Today it forms a park in the middle of inner city Hanover. The graves of Charlotte Buff (inspiration of Goethe's "Lotte" in The Sorrows of Young Werther), the astronomer Caroline Herschel and the painter Johann Heinrich Ramberg are located here. The Gartenfriedhof lies on Marienstraße between Warmbüchenstraße and Arnswaldtstraße.

== History ==
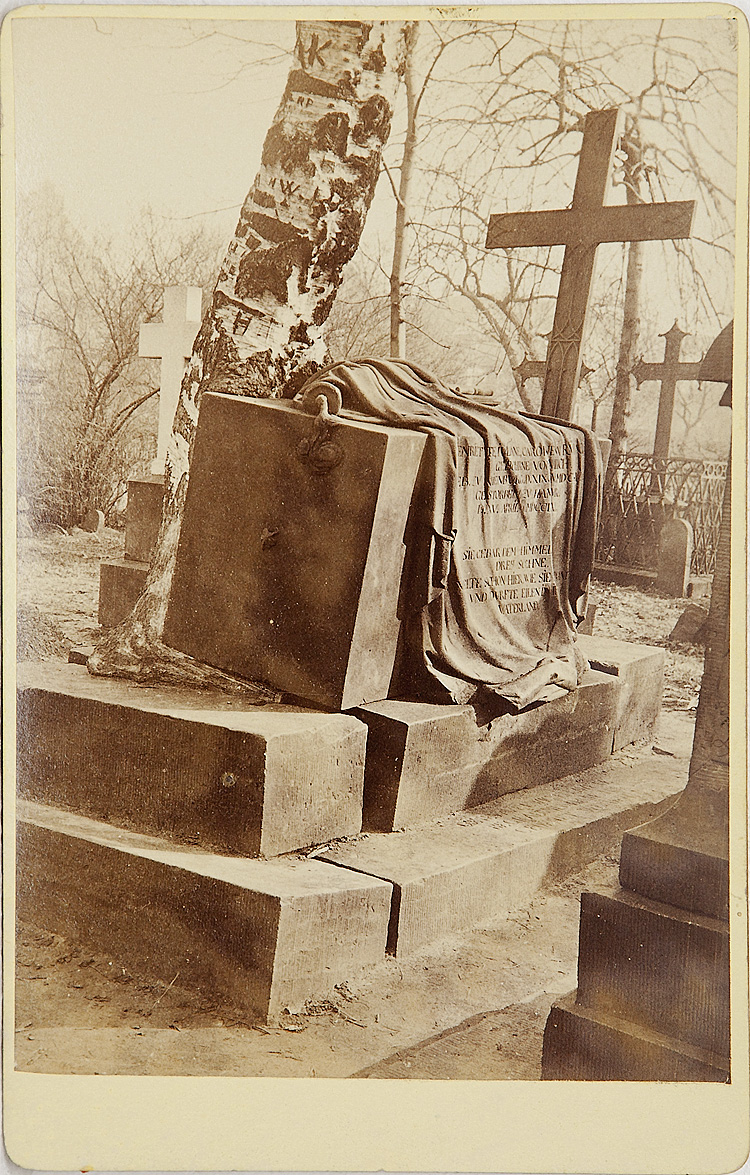
Photo of the tomb of Henriette Juliane Caroline von Rüling (1756–1782), c. 1880

The names Gartenfriedhof and Gartenkirche date to the establishment of the parish and its cemetery in the Garden community in the eighteenth century. At the time, the modern ward of Südstadt lay outside the city walls and the Aegidien Gate and was used by the "Garden folk" (Gartenleute) primarily for growing crops and vegetables for sale in the city of Hanover. Because of their simple homes, called Kates, these farmers were also known as "Garden Cossacks" (Gartenkosaken, punningly derived from cotter). In 1741, the City of Hanover established the "New Churchyard before the Aegidien Gate" (Neuen Kirchhof vor dem Aegidientor) for these people. Between 1746 and 1749 a simple aisle church with a flèche was built by Johann Paul Heumann as well – later to be known as the Gartenkirche. This was replaced by a new building constructed from 1887 to 1891 by the architect Rudolph Eberhard Hillebrand. At the beginning of the nineteenth century, the Gartenfriedhof was not just used by the Garden folk, but also by townspeople who settled in the nearby Aegidienneustadt from the middle of the eighteenth century: families of officials, soldiers, ministers, professors and councillors, who are commemorated on the stones of the Gartenfriedhof to this day. In their artistic devotion to classicising elements, these grave monuments represent the ethos of the bourgeois class – known in Hannöversch as the "Hübsche families. The grave monuments of this time, like urns, weeping jugs, the snake eating its own tail (symbolising eternity), the butterfly (transformation), and the extinguished torch are found throughout the Gartenfriedhof in numerous variations. There are also works of art, like the gravestone with acanthus flowers and palmettes designed by Georg Ludwig Friedrich Laves for Charlotte Buff or the four sphinxes pulling Kielmannsegge's stone sarcophagus.

Already in the nineteenth century, the Open Grave, subject of numerous horror stories, had developed into an early tourist attraction and a Hanover landmark.

Since the 1950s, the Gartenfriedhof has fallen into serious decay, especially the sandstone gravestones and wrought iron fences. Air pollution and also vandalism and the (ongoing) misuse of the Gartenfriedhof as a dog's toilet have contributed to this. Since the old fence was melted down during the Second World War, the former railing of the Kanalbrücke bridge in the Hanoverian suburb of Vinnhorst was recycled as a fence for the cemetery in 1984. Community efforts by various cultural societies finally led to the protection and refurbishment of the space. As a result, a bronze plaque with a map was installed in the entrance area in the mid-1990s by the Hannover-Leineschloß Rotary club, which makes it possible to find the way to the most distinguished surviving tombs. The numbers on this table are the same as those in literature issued by the Parks and Gardens Office.

== Renaissance Gartenfriedhof ==
=== The society ===
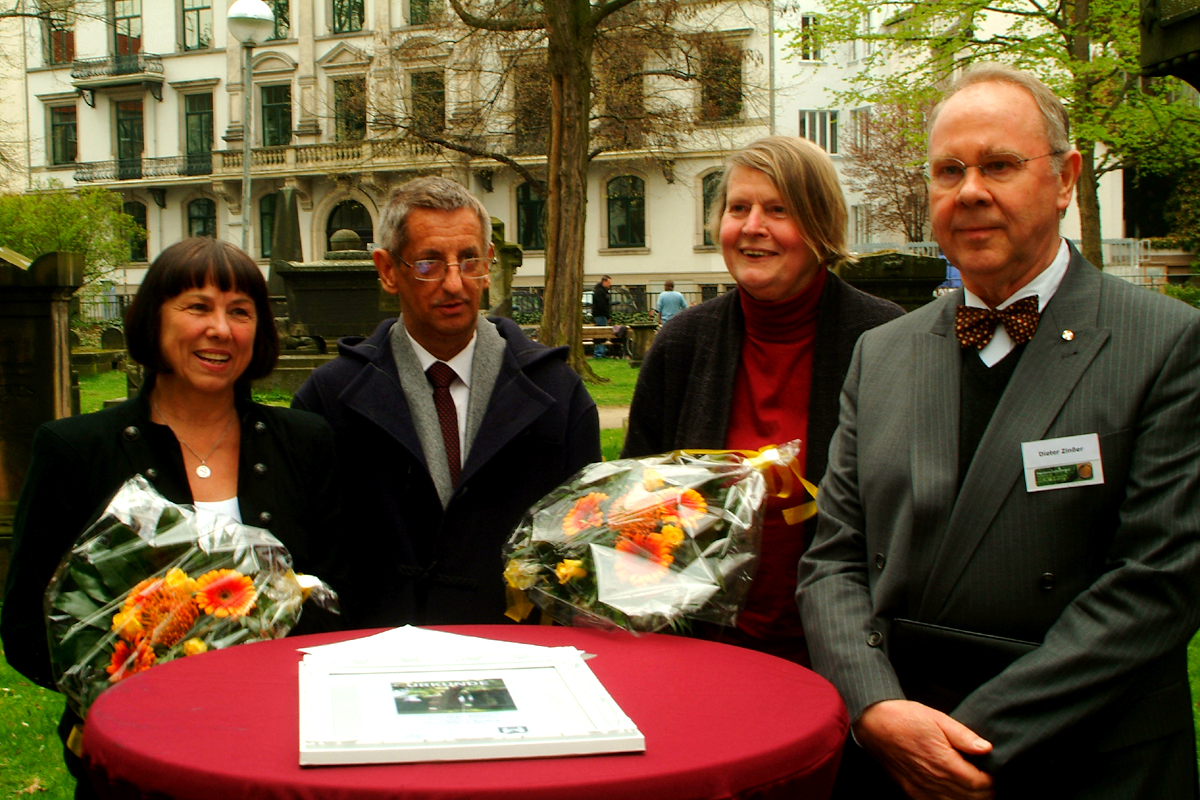
Celebration of the patrons. From left: Ingeborg Rupprecht, Ramberg's descendant Jürgen Behrens, the historian Alheidis von Rohr, retired Superintendent Dieter Zinßer.

In 2011 the group "Renaissance Gartenfriedhof" was founded under the umbrella of the Heimatbund Niedersachsen, from which the charitable organisation "Renaissance Gartenfriedhof e.V." was formed in September 2011. Their goals are:

- Improvement of the historic space,
- Conservation and restoration of the grave monuments,
- Negotiation of sponsorship for individual grave plots,
- Cultural use of the Gartenfriedhof for commemoration of the deceased, staged readings, concerts, and dramatic performances,
- Exhibition and presentation of the treasures of the Gartenfriedhof and establishment as a tourist destination.

=== Current sponsorship ===
The sponsorship of the gravestone of the royal court painter Johann Heinrich Ramberg was taken up by his great-great-great-grandson Jürgen Behrens. The inauguration of the sponsorship occurred on 14 April 2012 in the Gartenfriedhof. Speakers included the historian Alheidis von Rohr, retired Superintendent Dieter Zinßer who is the chairman of Renaissance Gartenfriedhof e.V., and mayor Bernd Strauch. The occasion was celebrated musically with songs from Ramberg's time by Ja-Henrik Behnken (tenor).

Further sponsors were celebrated in the Gartenfriedhof at the beginning of their sponsorships on 10 December 2011. Speakers included Dieter Zinßer and mayor Hans Mönninghoff. It concerned the graves of the following:

- Heinrich Andreas Jakob Lutz ("Menschenfressergrab") – Susanne Debus
- Hansing – Daniel Gardemin
- Johann Christoph Salfeld – Loccum Abbey
- Heinrich Tramm – Henriettenstiftung

The sponsorship of the gravestone of Charlotte Henriette Caroline Kestner nee Buff was undertaken by the charity "Ahlers pro Arte". This was celebrated on 24 September 2011, with speakers including Christel Thomczyk who is a fourth generation descendant of Charlotte Kestner, Jan Ahlers on behalf of the society, Dieter Zinßer, Ingeborg Rupprecht and Lord Mayor Stephan Weil. The celebration was enlivened by a brass band performance and short readings from Goethe's Dichtung und Wahrheit by Moritz Nikolaus Koch of Theater für Niedersachsen.

== Grave monuments (selection) ==
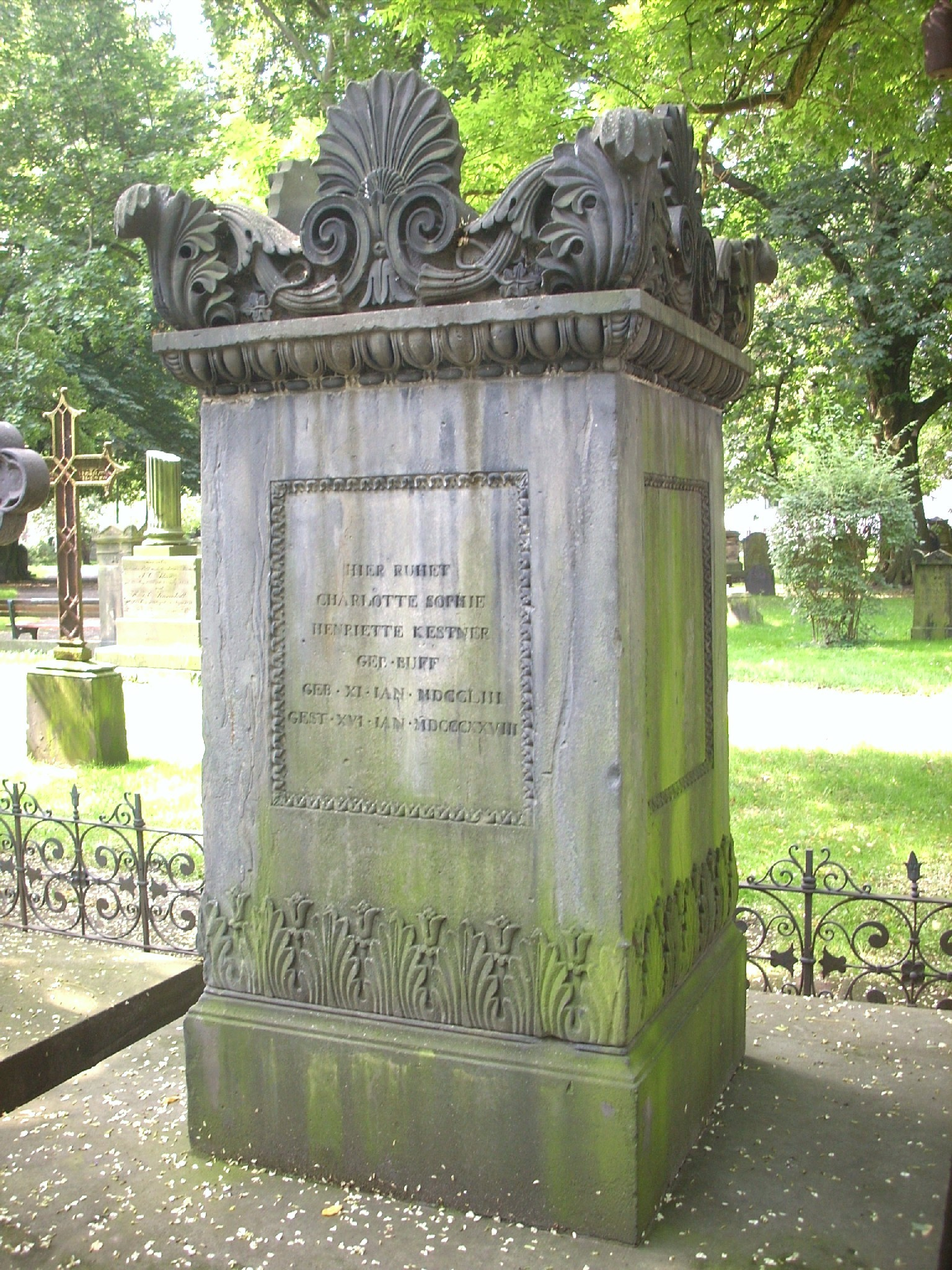
Tomb of Charlotte Kestner (No. 29)

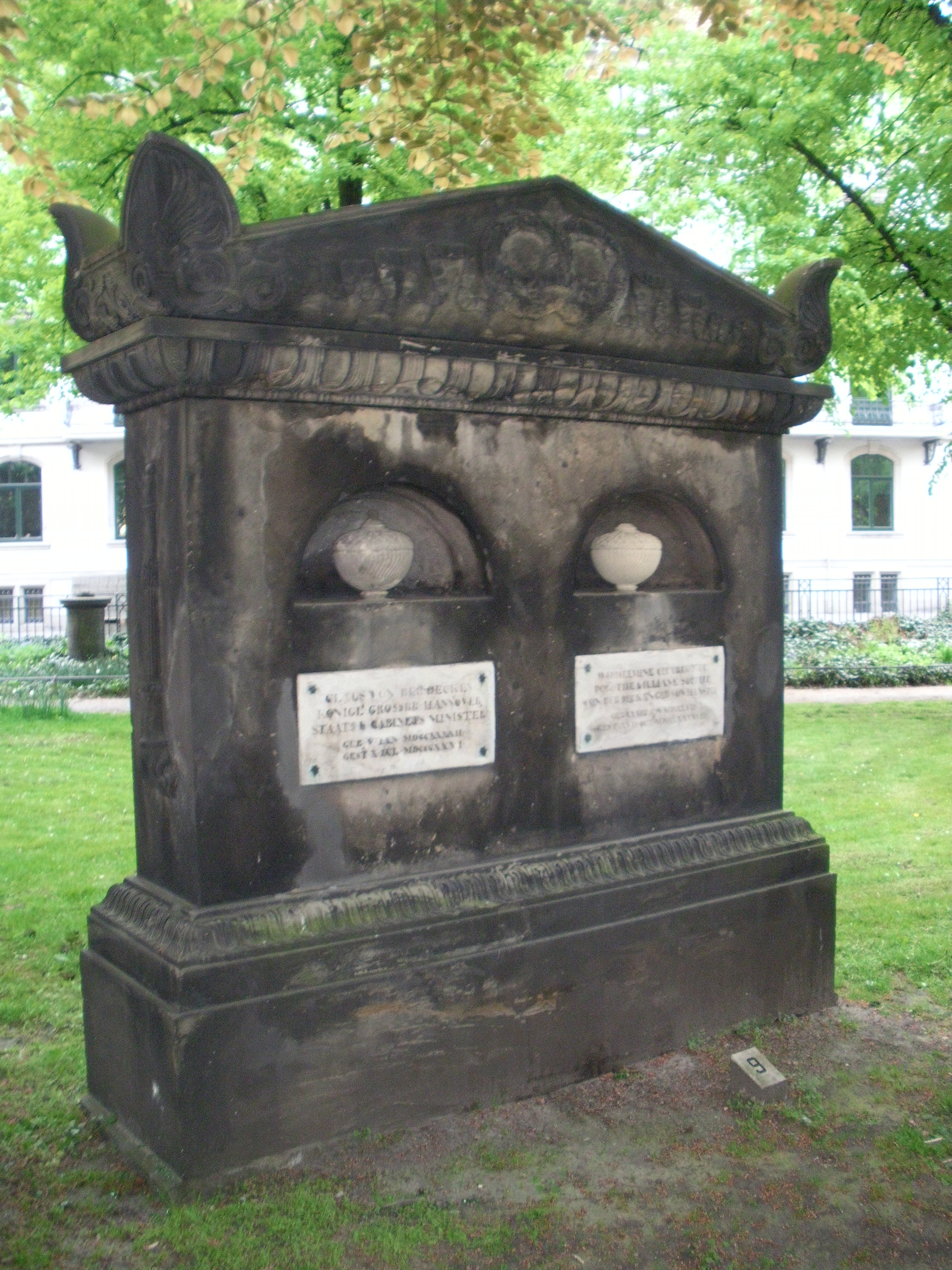
Tomb of minister von der Decken (No. 9)

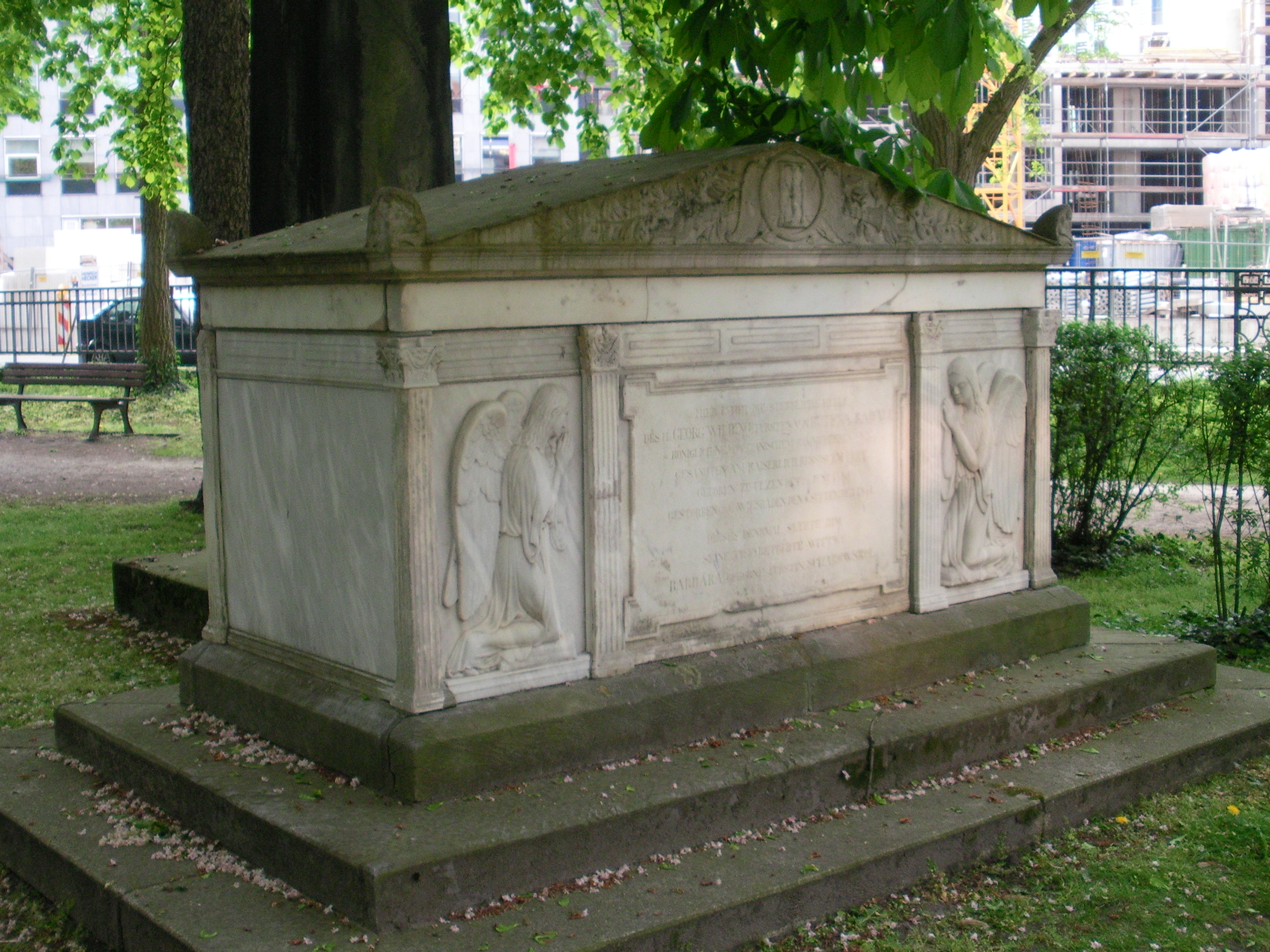
Tomb of Georg Wilding, Prince of Butera Radali (No. 28)

=== On the official table ===
The numbers match the bronze plaque at the entrance.

1. Ernst August Rumann (1745–1827), Privy Councillor, Minister of Justice.
2. Rudolph Wilhelm Rumann (1784–1857), Town clerk
3. Christian Philipp Iffland (1750–1835), Mayor
4. Johann Philipp Conrad Falcke (1724–1805), Chancellery Director, and Ernst Friedrich Hector Falcke (1751–1809), Judicial councillor and Mayor
5. August Ulrich von Hardenberg (1709–1778), Hanoverian diplomat, Privy councillor and Military councillor
6. Georg Friedrich Grotefend (1775–1853), Schoolmaster, decipherer of cuneiform
7. Ludewig Johann Georg Mejer (1737–1802), Councillor
8. Ludwig Friedrich von Beulwitz (1726–1796) and Magdalene Sophie Friederique von Beulwitz, ne von Kipe (1740–1801)
9. Claus von der Decken (1742–1826), Minister, and Sophie von der Decken, ne von Hanstein (1757–1798)
10. Johann Benjamin Koppe (1750–1791), Court chaplain
11. "Menschenfresser-Grab“ of Heinrich Richard Andreas Jakob Lutz (1728–1794), Royal Master Carpenter
12. Johann Christoph Salfeld (1750–1829), Priest
13. Heinrich Philipp Sextro (1746–1838), Professor and abbot
14. Carl Klop (1805–1840), Pastor at the Gartenkirche
15. Carl Rudolph August von Kielmannsegge (1731–1810), Minister and President of the Chamber
16. Ida Arenhold (1798–1863), first head of the Friederikenstift
17. Johann Daniel Ramberg (1733–1820), Councillor
18. Johann Heinrich Ramberg (1763–1840), Painter
19. Christian Heinrich Tramm (1819–1861), Architect
20. Heinrich Bernhard Röhrs (1776–1835), Businessman and Senator (Finance)
21. Caroline Herschel (1750–1848), Astronomer
22. Johann Anton Lammersdorff (1758–1822), Doctor and founder of Naturhistorischen Gesellschaft Hannover
23. Friedrich Wilhelm Christian von Dachenhausen (1791–1855), Founder of the trade association
24. Christian Ludwig Albrecht Patje (1748–1817), Official and Publicist
25. Ludwig Albrecht Friedrich Wilhelm Gottfried von Werlhof (1818–1836)
26. Ernst August von Werlhof (1778–1857), Privy Councillor
27. Friedrich Krancke (1782–1852), Maths teacher
28. Georg Wilding Prince of Butera Radali (1790–1841)
29. Charlotte Kestner (1753–1828)
30. Georg Ludwig Compert (1797–1859), State builder
31. Christian Ludwig August von Arnswaldt (1733–1815), Minister
32. Henriette Juliane Caroline von Rüling (1756–1782), whose Open Grave was a civic landmark
33. Georg Charlotte von Hinüber (1764–1828), Postmaster general, Cabinet minister and Privy Councillor, Major, Diplomat, Auditor of the Chancellery and art historian
34. Ludwig Eberhard Reichsfreiherr von Gemmingen-Hornberg (1719–1782), Minister
35. Georg Wilhelm Ebell (1696–1770), Abbot of Loccum, Founder of the Civic fire department (plaque on the inner south wall of the Gartenkirche)
36. Ernst Anton Heiliger (1729–1803), Councillor and mayor of the Old City.

=== Additional graves ===
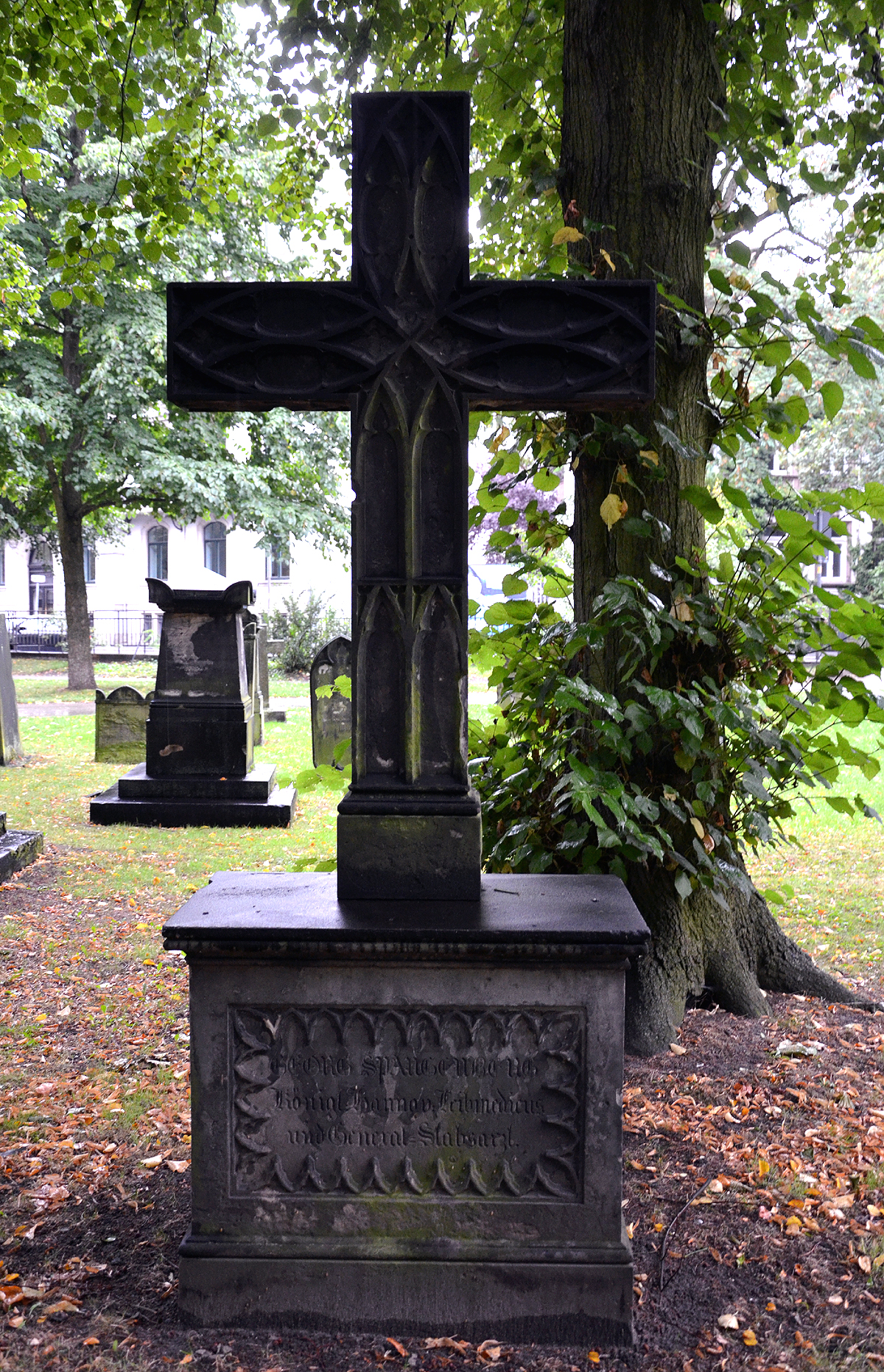
Tomb for (Johann) Georg Spangenberg

- Ernst Ludwig Taentzel (also Täntzel, Tänzel, Taenzel) (1791–1845), Mason and Court stonemaster
- Johann Georg Taentzel (also Tänzel, Taenzel, Täntzel) (1755–1815), Court and council master mason-architect and stonemason.
- Shared tomb of
  - Georg Friedrich Mühry (1774–1848), important doctor of the first half of the nineteenth century, Upper medical council, Court Doctor, scholarly author (birth date on the tomb is incorrect!)
  - Carl Mühry (1806–1840), Court doctor and author
- Johann Georg Spangenberg (1788–1849), royal personal doctor

== See also ==
- List of cemeteries

== Bibliography ==
- Conrad von Meding, HAZ-Interview / Mehr Respekt für Gartenfriedhof gefordert in Hannoversche Allgemeine Zeitung, 19 October 2012, last accessed 23. November 2012.
- Ludwig Damm, "Von alten Friedhöfen der Stadt Hannover", edited by Magistrat, Hannover 1914.
- Alfred Fuhrmann, "Der Gartenfriedhof in Hannover in geschichtlicher und kunstgeschichtlicher Bedeutung." Hannoverscher Volks-Kalender. vol. 62 (1931), pp. 45–51.
- Arnold Nöldeke, "Die Kunstdenkmäler der Provinz Hannover". 1: Regierungsbezirk Hannover. Heft 2: Stadt Hannover. Teil 1: Denkmäler des "alten" Stadtgebietes Hannover. Hannover 1932, pp. 192–200.
- Hinrich Hesse, "Die Grabinschriften des Gartenkirchhofs in Hannover." Zeitschrift der Gesellschaft für niedersächsische Kirchengeschichte. vol. 44 (1939), pp. 235–290.
- Hans Geiß, "Der Gartenfriedhof", in: Heimatland, 1983, pp. 1–3.
- Gerhard Richter, "Der Gartenfriedhof in Hannover", in Hannoversche Geschichtsblätter, New Series, vol. 38 (1984), pp. 53–76, ISSN 0342-1104
- Ludwig Wülker, "Die Hannoverschen Friedhöfe im Wandel der Geschichte". Hannoversche Geschichtsblätter, New Series 5 (1939), pp. 76–81.
- Waldemar R. Röhrbein, "Von Hannovers alten Friedhöfen." In Geschichten um Hannovers Kirchen. Studien, Bilder, Dokumente, edited by Hans Werner Dannowski und Waldemar R. Röhrbein, Hannover: Lutherhaus-Verlag 1983, pp. 97–102 (auch über den Gartenfriedhof), ISBN 3-87502-145-2.
- Gerd Weiß, Marianne Zehnpfennig, "Gartenkirche und Gartenfriedhof," in Denkmaltopographie Bundesrepublik Deutschland, Baudenkmale in Niedersachsen, Stadt Hannover, Teil 1, [Bd.] 10.1, ISBN 3-528-06203-7, pp. 65f.
- Helmut Knocke, Hugo Thielen, Hannover. Kunst- und Kultur-Lexikon. Handbuch und Stadtführer. 3., rev. Aufl. Schäfer, Hannover 1995, p. 149.
- Inge Pusch et al. (Text): Der Gartenfriedhof, free Brochure of the Landeshauptstadt Hannover
  - or as .PDF online
- Peter Schulze: "Gartenfriedhof" in Stadtlexikon Hannover, pp. 202.
