= Warmbüchenviertel =

Area in Mitte, Hanover

Coordinates: 52.371°N 9.748°E

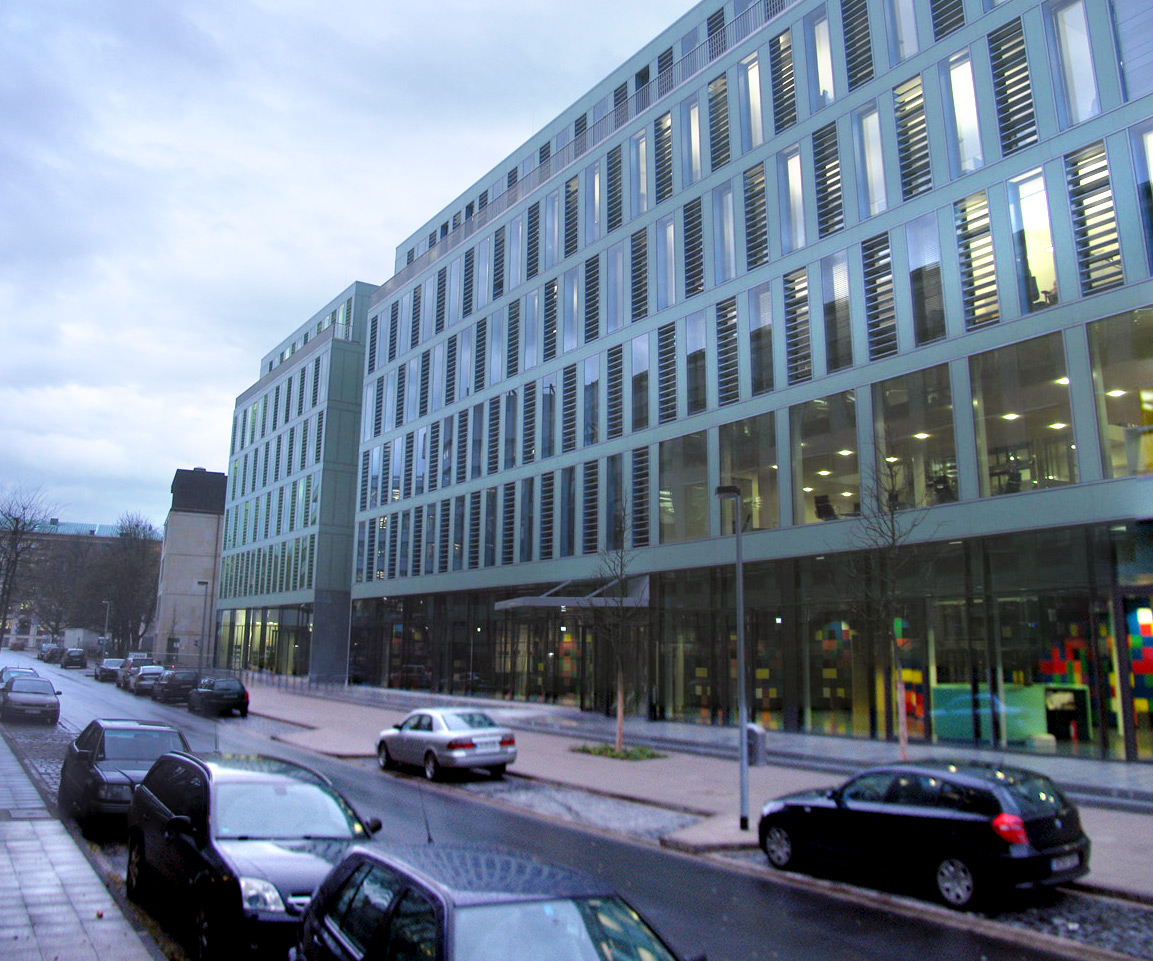
view of Warmbüchenstraße in Warmbüchenkamp

Warmbüchenviertel is an area in the quarter and borough of Mitte in Hanover. The quarter is characterised by insurance companies and other office buildings, but is also an inner city residential area. The name derives from two major streets: Warmbüchenstraße und Warmbüchenkamp.

== Layout ==
Warmbüchenviertel is bounded by the streets Schiffgraben, Marienstraße and Berliner Allee, while the northern limit is formed by the railway. The quarter's main road is Lavesstraße.

== History ==
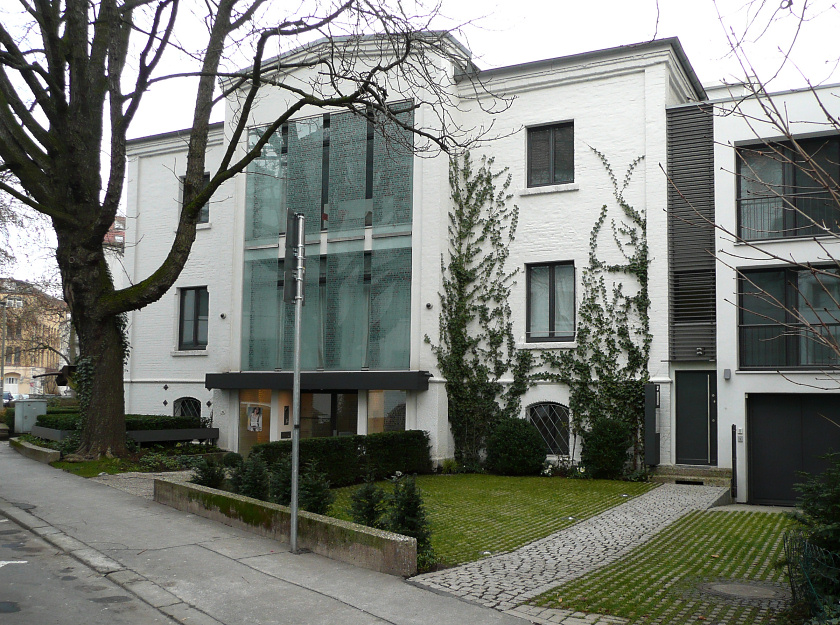
Headquarters of the charity Ahlers Pro Arte - one of the oldest buildings in Warmbüchenviertel.

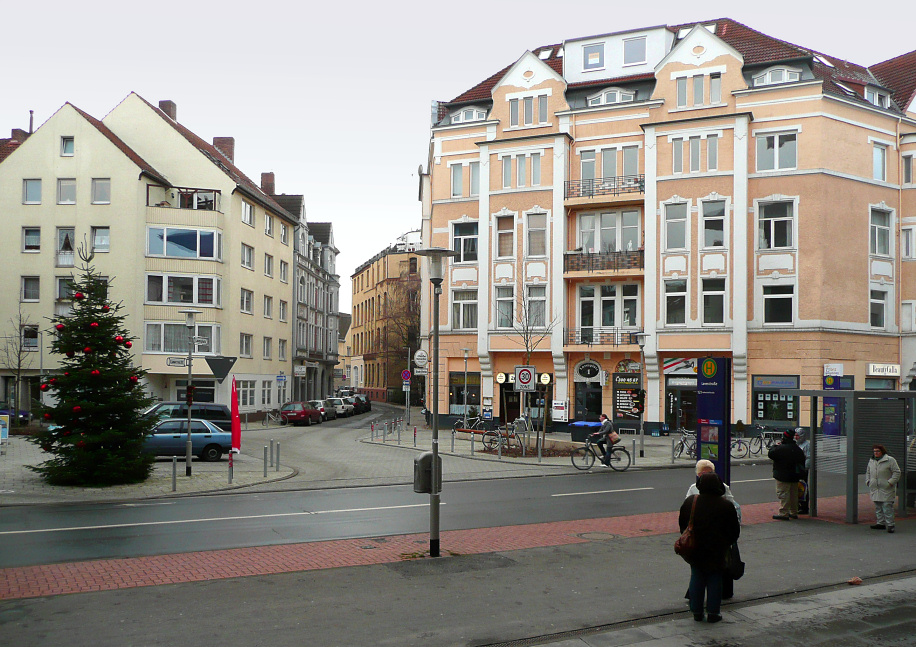
Lavesplatz

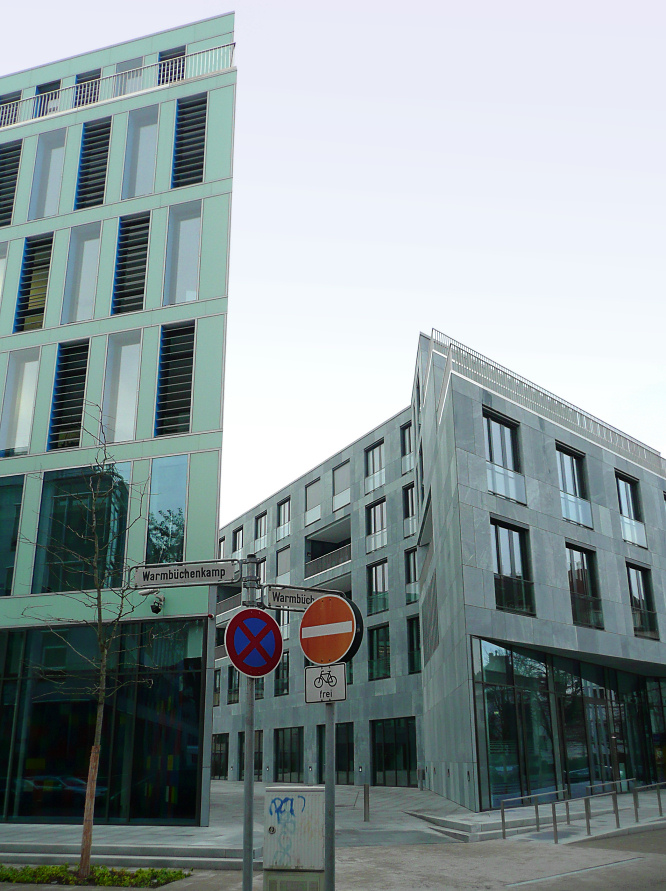
Buildings on Warmbüchenkamp Road

Towards the end of the 1840s, the Hanover city limit was Schiffgraben street, a former canal. At the time Warmbüchenviertel was an extramural agricultural area and known as Kirchwende (Church Corner), which is where Kirchwender Straße gets its name from. Here smallholders cultivated vegetables to sell in the market. The nearest city gate was the Aegidientor, from which the modern day Marienstraße ran eastwards, serving as the way to market. The Gartenkirche stood within Warmbüchenviertel, on Marienstraße from 1746. Its cemetery was the Gartenfriedhof, where Charlotte Kestner was buried, among others.

One of the oldest houses in Warmbüchenviertel is the building which is now the headquarters of the charity "Ahlers Pro Arte". It was once owned by the Alfeld textile manufacturer Ahlers and was also the contemporary location of the kestnergesellschaft gallery.

Despite popular protest, a building designed by Hermann Schaedtler was demolished in 2008. It was a monumental building with a round dome (destroyed in the Second World War), which was the original headquarters of the health insurer AOK. The medical supplier Ärzteversorgung Sachsen-Anhalt is currently (as of October 2009) building a luxury residential complex with almost 100 apartments on the site. It will be named "Warmbüchenviertel" after the quarter.

== Civic engagement ==
The Anliegerinitiative Lavesstraße/Warmbüchenviertel (Lavesstraße/Warmbüchenviertel Neighbourhood Organisation) was established in February 2001, to which businesses and homeowners belong. They act together sporadically to influence developments in the quarter. Among other things, they blocked the construction of a hotel (on the current location of the firefighters' association). The Anliegerinitiative also made strong submissions in favour of the conversion of the intersection of Warmbüchenstraße and Dieterichsstraße with Lavesstraße. This resulted in the Lavesplatz (Laves Plaza), which was opened on 7 September 2007 and bears the name of the nineteenth century Hanoverian court architect Georg Ludwig Friedrich Laves. The Anliegerinitiative also supported the re-establishment of an active merchants' association in Warmbüchenviertel, with the help of the city council. This resulted in the establishment of "Integrativen Stadtteilarbeit," an organisation which is externally moderated by the Hanoverian company KoriS. Since 2006, the organisation has been concerned with the revival of Lavesstraße as a High Street.
