= Paul Fischer (German painter) =

German painter (1786–1875)

(John George) Paul Fischer (1786–1875) was a German painter.

Fischer was born at Hanover on 16 September 1786. He was the youngest of three sons of a line-engraver, who died very soon after the birth of the youngest child, leaving his family in poverty. At the age of fourteen, Fischer was placed as a pupil with Johann Heinrich Ramberg, the fashionable court painter, by whom he was employed in painting portraits, theatrical scenery, and generally assisting his master. He became capable of earning enough money to support his mother. In 1810 he betook himself to England, and his Hanoverian connection rendered it easy for him to obtain the patronage of royalty.

He painted miniature portraits of Queen Charlotte and the junior members of the royal family, and was employed by the Prince Regent to paint a series of military costumes. In 1817 he began to exhibit at the Royal Academy, and continued to do so up to 1852, occasionally contributing also to the Suffolk Street Exhibitions. His works were chiefly portraits in miniature, but he occasionally exhibited landscapes in watercolours. He continued to paint up to his eighty-first year, and died 12 September 1875. Fischer was an industrious but inferior artist. Some sketches by him in the print room at the British Museum show spirit and intelligence, especially two pencil portraits of William Hunt and his wife. He published a few etchings and lithographs.

== See also ==
- List of German painters
