= Johann Heinrich Ramberg =

German painter and printmaker (1763–1840)

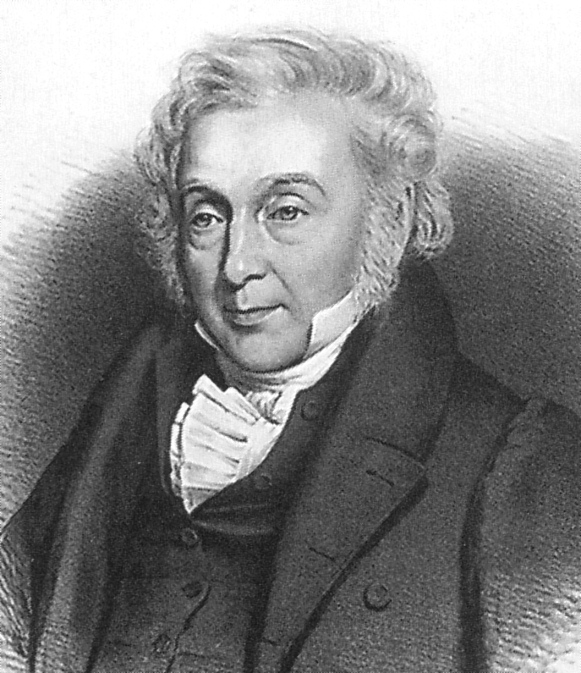
Ramberg

Johann Heinrich (a.k.a. John Henry) Ramberg (22 July 1763 – 6 July 1840) was a German painter and printmaker.

Ramberg was born at Hanover to a father who fostered his artistic talent. He first showed his talent by drawings of scenes in the Harz Mountains. These became known to George III, King of Great Britain, his sovereign, since he was also Elector of Hanover. In 1781 he was introduced to George III and made "many humorous sketches and caricatures" for him. George induced Ramberg to go to London, where he provided support. Ramberg may have been a student of Joshua Reynolds and Francesco Bartolozzi; in November 1781, he studied with Benjamin West at the Royal Academy Schools. In 1782 he began exhibiting at the Royal Academy and in 1784 he was awarded a silver medal for his life drawing. In 1784 Ramberg drew the exhibition itself, showing Reynolds and the Prince of Wales, as well as several other pieces. According to the Oxford Dictionary of National Biography, "[t]hese works are of interest to historians for their record of exhibitions in the Great Room of the Royal Academy in the late eighteenth century."

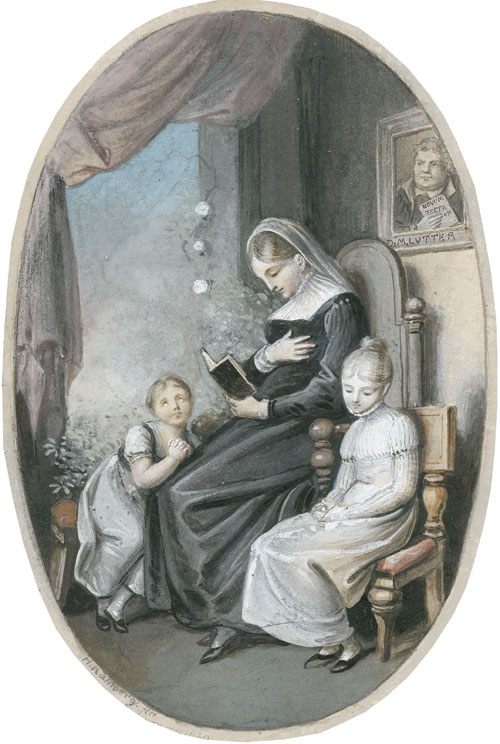
Ramberg's illustration for Jacob Glatz's Aureliens Stunden der Andacht (1820)

In 1788, Ramberg visited the Netherlands, Germany, and Italy, and then returned to Hanover in 1792, where he was appointed electoral court painter. While court painter he periodically took on students, including John Fischer. He painted the curtain of the court theater in Hanover in 1789. He met the German author Goethe in 1790–91 and painted Alexander Crossing the Granicus as a decoration for Carlton House. He was also a book illustrator, participating in John Boydell's Shakespeare Gallery, for example, and Thomas Macklin's Poets' Gallery. He painted portraits of members of the British royal family: the princesses Mary, Elizabeth, and Sophia. He illustrated German almanacs and pocketbooks for over 20 years, but according to the Oxford Dictionary of National Biography "his best illustrations are those which he himself etched for the narrative cycles Reineke Fuchs and Tyll Eulenspiegel, both published in 1826". He became one of the most well known illustrators in Germany. He did the drawings for a deluxe edition of Wieland's works.

Ramberg died at Hanover and was buried in the Gartenkirchhof.

== Literature ==
- Alexander Košenina (Hrsg.): Literatur – Bilder. Johann Heinrich Ramberg als Buchillustrator der Goethezeit. Wehrhahn Verlag, Hannover 2013, ISBN 978-3-86525-339-2.
- Greiffenegg und Ramberg: eine Freundschaft in Zeichnungen. Ausstellungskatalog, Haus der Graphischen Sammlung im Augustinermuseum 8. Juli 2017 - 3. Oktober 2017 / herausgegeben von Felix Reuße für die Städtischen Museen Freiburg, Augustinermuseum. ISBN 978-3-7319-0449-6
- Johann Heinrich Ramberg / Dietrich Wilhelm Soltau: Reineke Fuchs – Reynard the Fox. 31 Originalzeichnungen und neu kolorierte Radierungen mit Auszügen aus der deutschen Übersetzung des Epos im populären Stil v. Soltau | 31 original drawings and newly colored etchings with excerpts from the English translation of the burlesque poem by Soltau. Hrsg. Waltraud Maierhofer. VDG, Weimar 2016. ISBN 978-3-89739-854-2.
