= Ida Arenhold =

German social welfare pioneer (1798–1863)

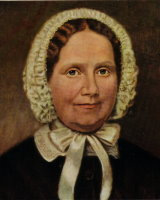
- ca.1840
- Born: 11 October 1798; Herzberg am Harz, Electorate of Hanover
- Died: 24 September 1863 (aged 64); Hanover, Germany
- Occupation: social welfare pioneer
- Parent(s): Wilhelm Arenhold (1768–1849); Ilse Leßmann

Ida Arenhold (11 October 1798 – 24 September 1863) was a German social welfare pioneer. She was a co-founder and the first overseer of the Friederikenstift which is the oldest and still the largest hospital in Hanover.

== Biography ==
Ida Arenhold was born in Herzberg am Harz, a small country town between Hanover and Göttingen. She was the first of the eight recorded children of Wilhelm Arenhold (1768–1849), a senior court/government official, by his marriage to Ilse Leßmann. A year later the family moved to Hanover in connection with Wilhelm Arenhold's work. In 1822, after a long illness, her mother died. Ida was left to take charge of her father's substantial household and look after her seven younger siblings.

The second part of the eighteenth century was a period of industrialisation. People moved from the countryside to the towns and cities in search of better wages. One result was an increase in urban poverty, and in several towns this elicited a response from middle-class women. With seven other women, also from upper middle-class backgrounds, Ida Arenhold was inspired by the pioneering work of Amalie Sieveking in Hamburg to set up, in Hanover, the "Frauenverein für Armen- und Krankenpflege" ("Women's association for the care of the poor and sick") with the stated objective of supporting people helping themselves ("Hilfe zur Selbsthilfe"). The work was financed by donations. The members met regularly, with Arenhold chairing their meetings between 1840 and 1863, in order to discuss how best to deal with individual cases. The basic records of their practical help were set out in a "Minute Book" in which the ladies made notes about their house visits.

British custom disregarded the Salic law, as a result of which Hanover and Britain no longer shared a single monarch. King Ernest Augustus, who had served as ruler of Hanover since 1837, was an enthusiastic backer of Arenhold's initiative and gifted to her association the "Weisshaarschen Hof" (court complex) in Calenberger Neustadt, across the river from what then counted as the Hanover city centre. The complex was rebuilt by the court architect, Georg Laves. The king paid. It now incorporated hospital wards for adults and others for children. There were residential apartments for the poor, a soup kitchen, a "pre-school" (i.e. Kindergarten) and a shop where product from the on-site spinning, knitting and sewing schools was sold alongside food produced by the little on-site farm. The establishment opened and was duly "consecrated" (opened by the king) on 7 August 1843. Arenhold was a co-founder and the first overseer. It was at the king's instigation that on 23 May 1944 the establishment was renamed the "Friederikenstift". The name, which has remained unchanged for one and three quarter centuries, honoured the memory of Queen Frederica who had died three years earlier.

== Personal ==
Ida Arenhold never married. She kept house for her father till he died in 1849, which freed her up to move into the Friederikenstift. That enabled her to give her full attention to her duties as chair of the association, "house-mother" and matron. She provided leadership for the sisterhood, women and girls who wished to place their lives at the service of the association. They were trained to take care of the sick, worked in the hospital and lived in the "Schwesternhaus" accommodation block, often for their entire lives.

She was driven by a strong religious conviction. She took to heart and liked to quote, Christ's maxim, "... Inasmuch as ye have done it unto one of the least of these my brethren, ye have done it unto me" (Matth. 25:40). (Note: "Alles, was ihr getan habt einem unter diesen meinen geringsten Brüdern, das habt ihr mir getan.")

Ida Arenhold died on 24 September. Her body is buried in the city's Gartenfriedhof.
