= Aegidientorplatz =

Square in Hanover, Germany

Aegidien Gate Square
- Aegi
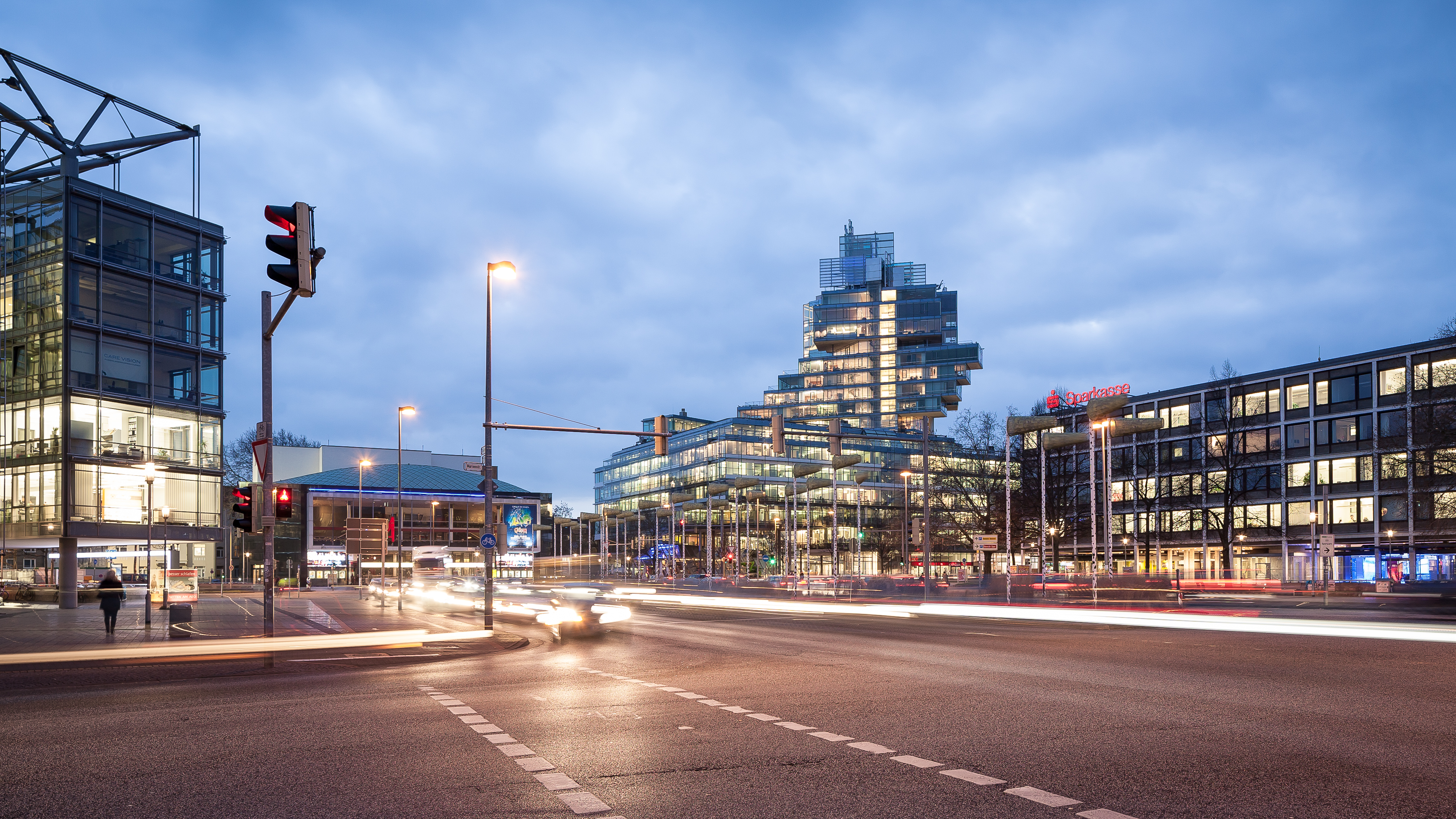
- Aegidien Gate Square as seen from its north. Visible from left to right are Gate House (Torhaus), Theatre at Aegi (Theater am Aegi), and the headquarters of banks Nord/LB and Sparkasse Hanover.
- Aegidien Gate Square is situated roughly where the Aegidien Gate was located in the 13th-century city wall (●) and 17th-century inner bastion (●) enclosing the old town.
- Native name: Aegidientorplatz (German)
- Namesake: Aegidien Gate
- Location: Hanover, Germany
- Coordinates: 52°22′06″N 9°44′38″E

Aegidien Gate Square (German: Aegidientorplatz) is a busy square known colloquially as Aegi in Hanover, Germany. Located above a subway station of the same name, the square was named for the Aegidien Gate (Aegidientor), one of the city gates of medieval Hanover. While the gate was removed in 1780, the square is still named after it.

== Aegidien Gate ==
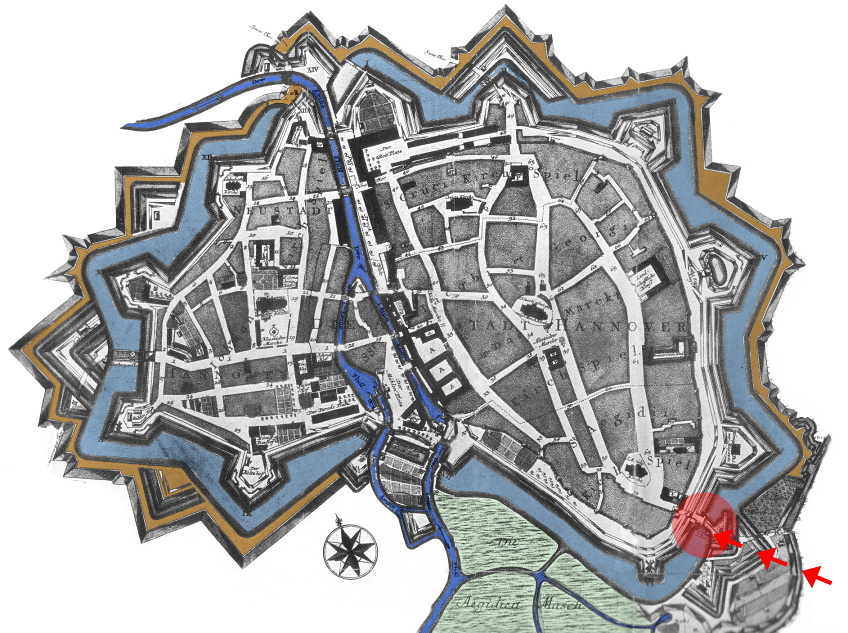
The location of Aegidien Gate in the civic fortifications of Hanover is marked in red.

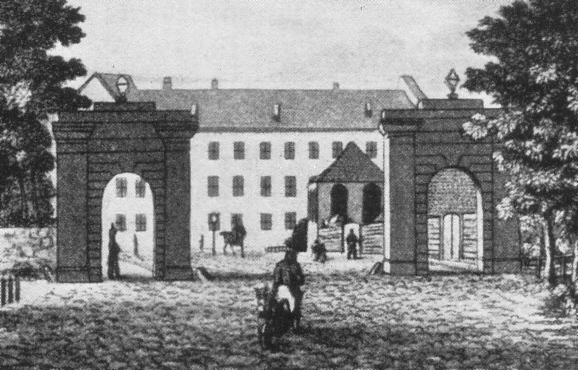
Aegidien Gate as a decorative archway, c. 1830

The Aegidien Gate (Aegidientor) was the southeastern gate in the civic fortifications of Hanover. Through it the road from Hildesheim entered the city. Its name derived from the nearby Aegidien Church, although it was occasionally also written as Egidien Thor.

First built in 1307 as a multi-story inner tower-gate with a passageway, it stood in the middle of Broad Street (Breite Straße). During the renovation of the city walls in 1504, a ward was built outside the walls, right next to the outer gatehouse (roughly in the middle of the modern Aegidien Gate Square). After that, visitors entered the city by passing over the moat on a drawbridge, through the outer gatehouse, over a second bridge and through the inner gate. This arrangement was removed in the dismantling of the civic fortifications from 1763. Today there is a plaque at 7/10 Broad Street, marking the former location of the medieval inner tower-gate. The tower was demolished in 1748 by mayor Christian Ulrich Grupen to make way for New Aegidien Town.

Outside the gate was the settlement of Eddingerode. Established in the 9th century, and thus predating the fortifications and gate, it was abandoned in the 15th century.

== Aegidien Gate Square ==
In the course of slighting the civic fortifications after 1780, the remnants of the gate structure were demolished and the location occupied by the Aegidien Gate Square around 1844. A checkpoint (somewhere near the end of Marienstraße) and a more decorative gate structure took over the last remaining functions of the city gate. This structure was itself demolished in 1859.

The square has been characterised by a severely geometrical, classicising arrangement of streets for a long time. From 1872, a horsecar stopped at the square, linking it to Kröpcke via George Street.

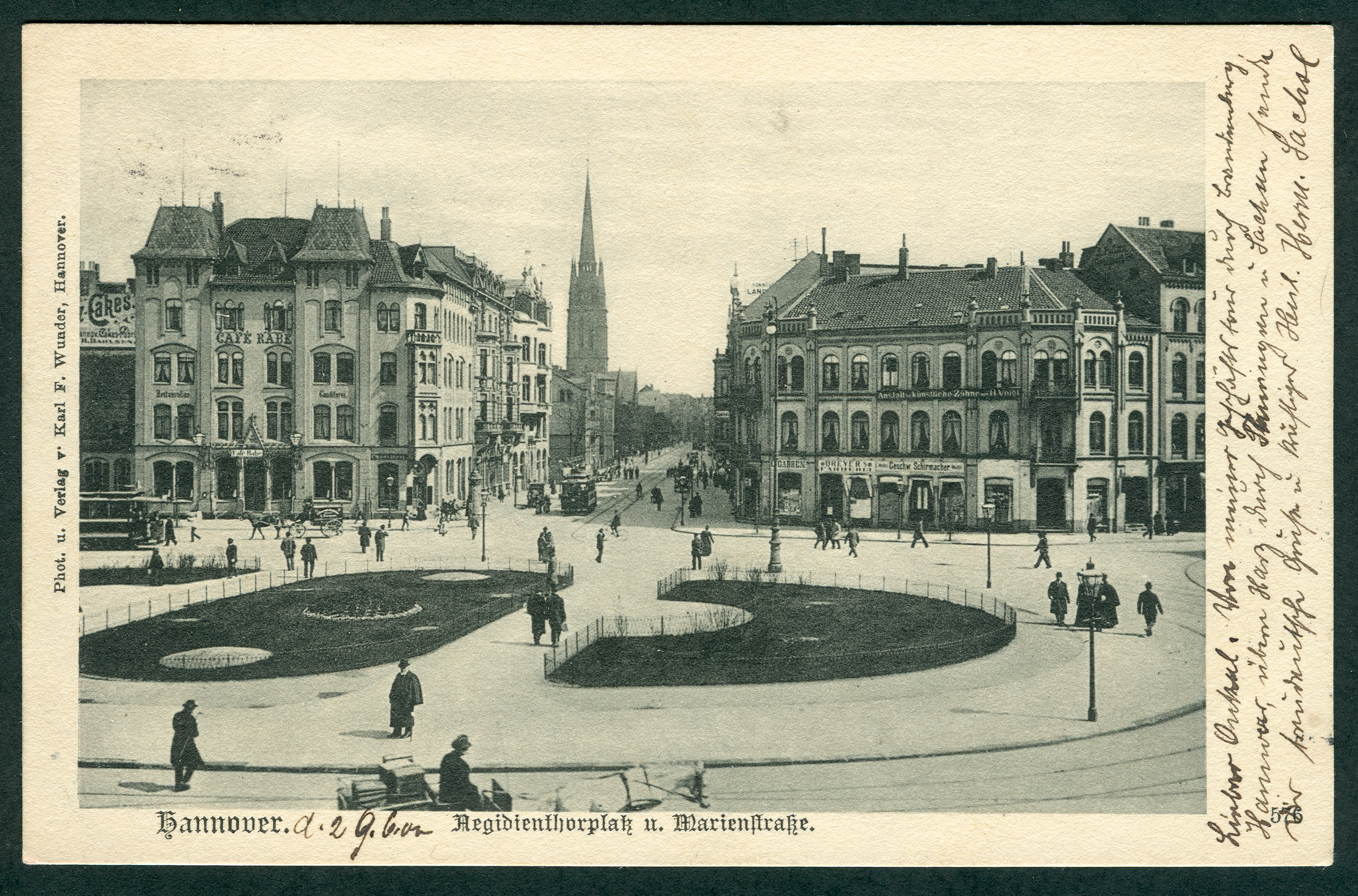
Aegidien Gate Square, c. 1898

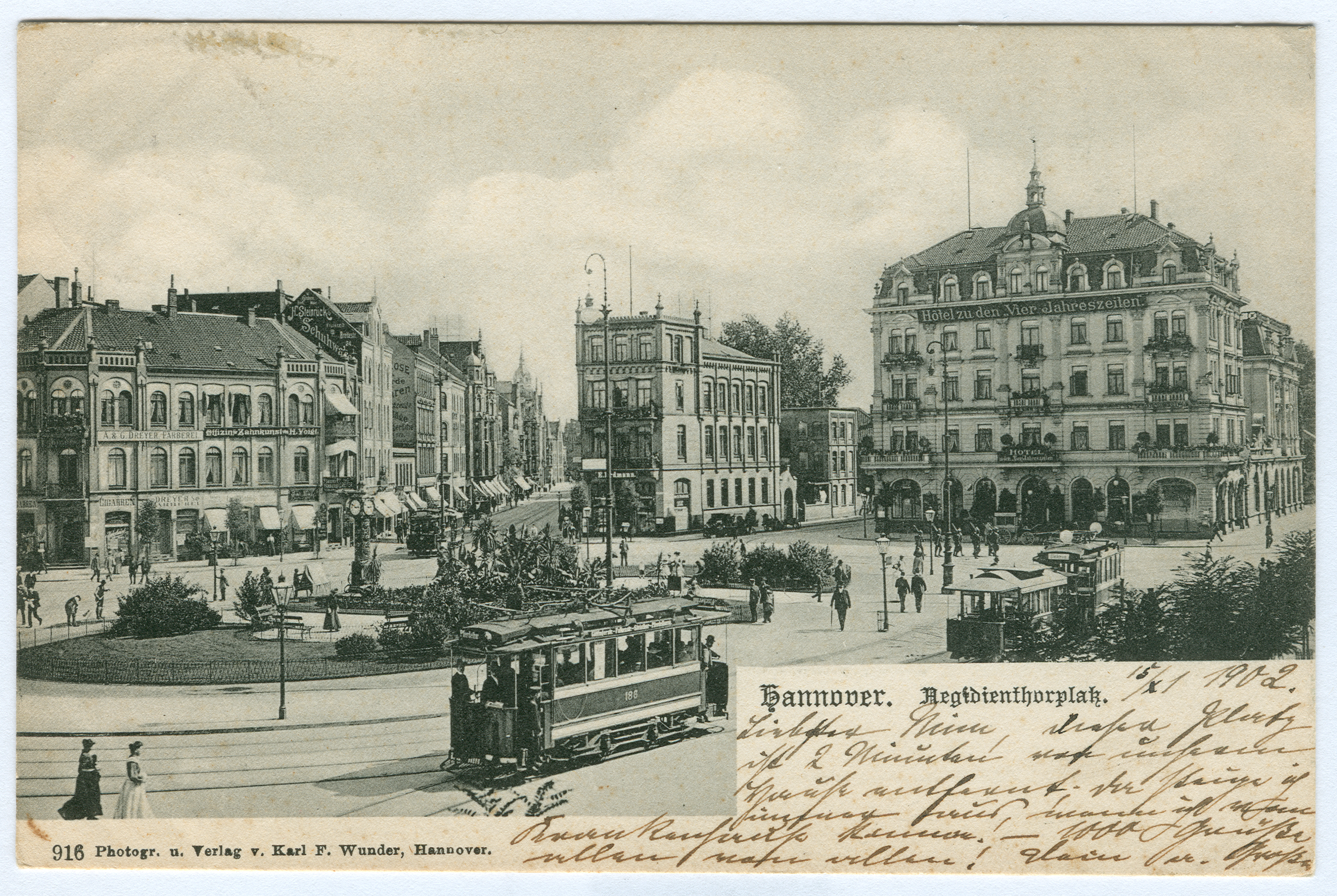
View towards Hildesheimer Straße, seen left of the central building, c. 1900

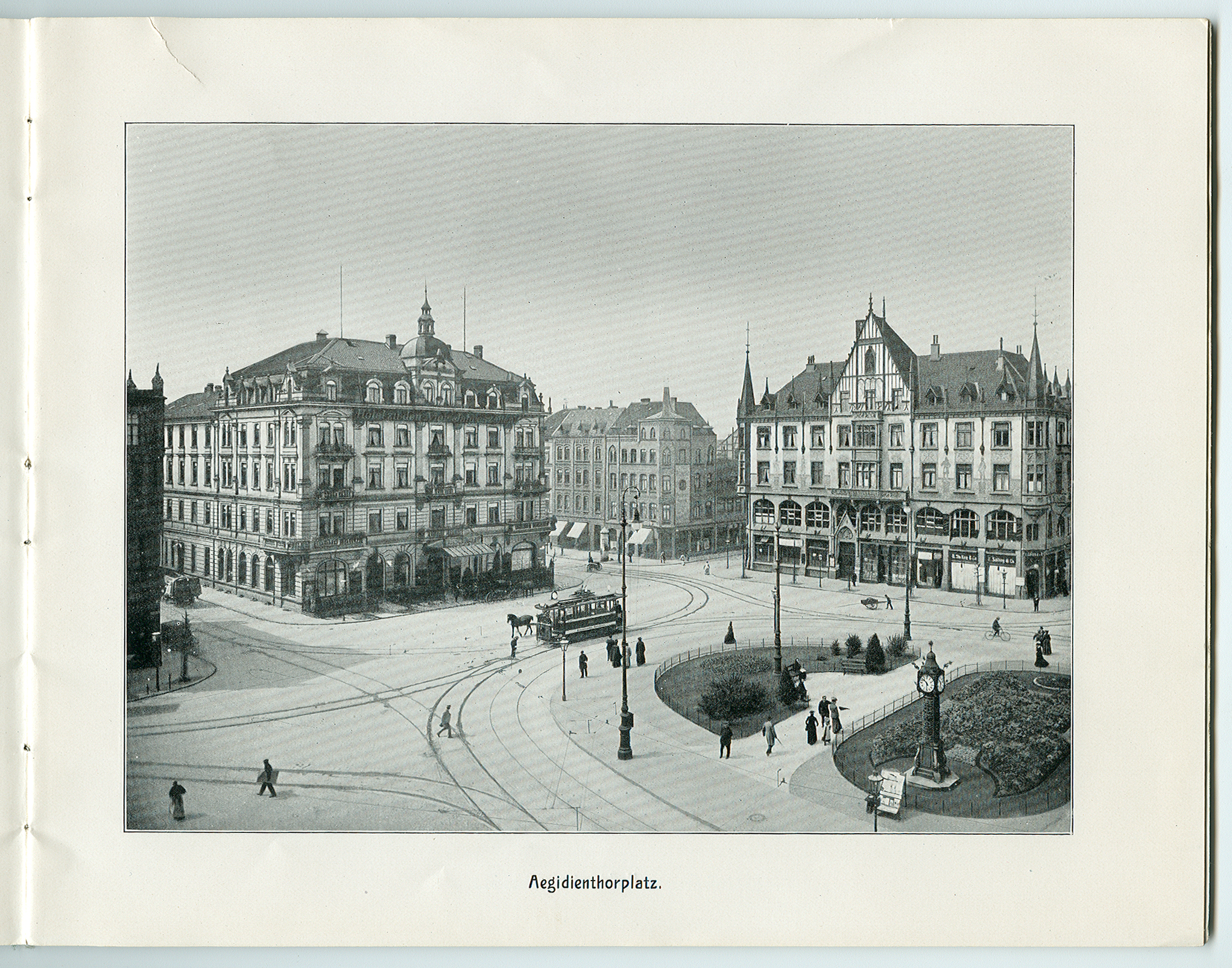
Aegidien Gate Square, c. 1900

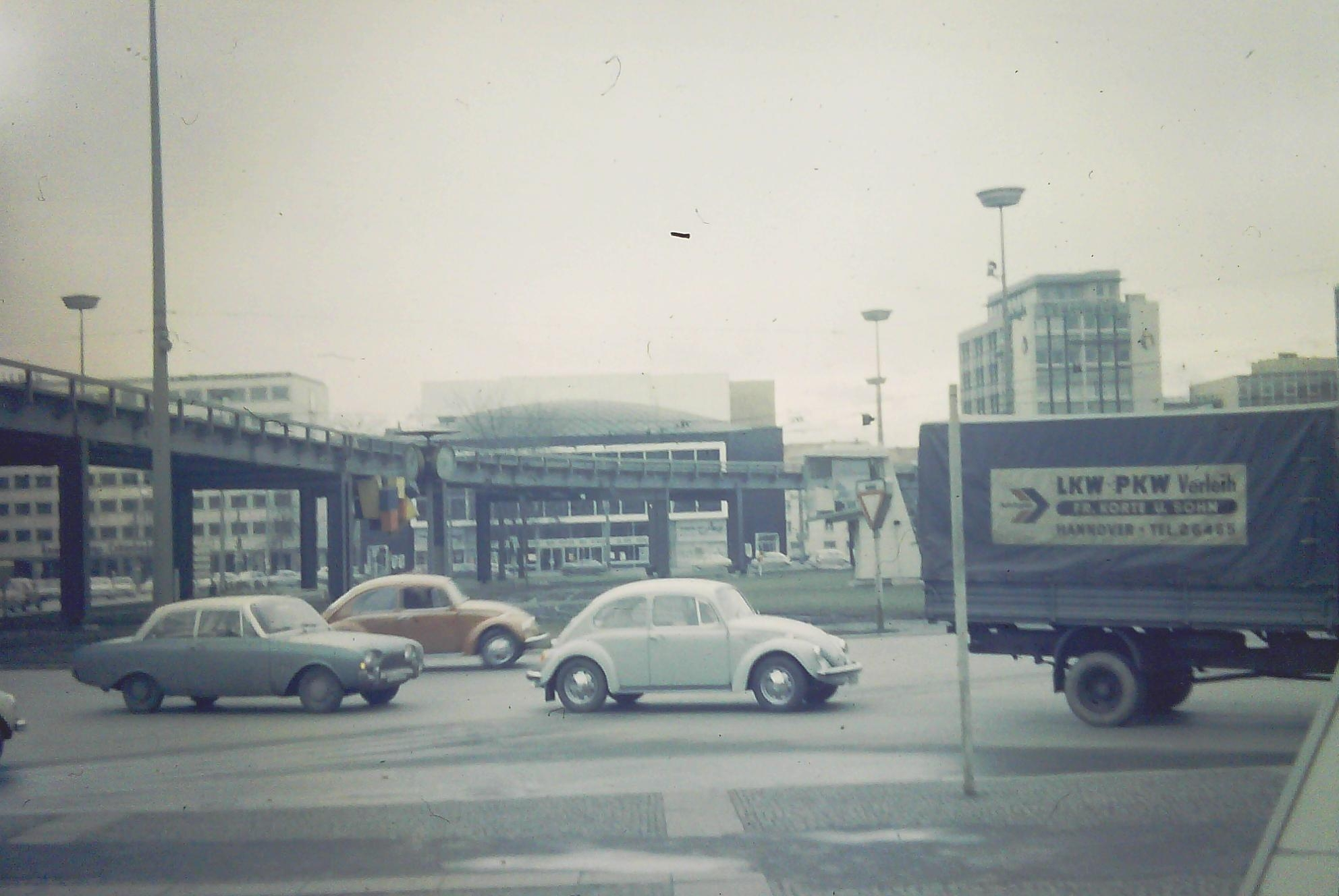
Aegidien Gate Square with overpass, after 1969

As a result of the conversion of Hanover's main roads into the Cityring in the 1950s, the square was made significantly more spacious. Beginning in September 1968, an overpass was constructed above the square as part of the inner city ring, despite five construction stoppages to allow the construction of the Hanover Stadtbahn. It was opened to traffic on 1 November 1968. This street, known as Aegi Overpass, was originally intended as a temporary measure. However, it remained in use until it was demolished on 17–18 October 1998. The Aegi Overpass often had to be closed in winter due to ice build up, was only authorised for cars weighing less than 3.5 tonnes (7,700 lb), and was limited to a top speed of 30 kilometres per hour (19 mph).

Planning for the reconstruction and renovation of the square began in 1996. At this time the Stadtbahn line 10 ended at Friedrichstraße (now the site of the NORD/LB building). By rearranging the Stadtbahn and demolishing the dilapidated overpass, a completely new arrangement was to be produced. This plan followed a general plan of the civil engineering department of the city of Hanover and TransTeC-bau, a subsidiary of üstra. From the end of 1997 until 1999, the square was completely rebuilt. The Stadtbahn received a raised rail platform designed by the architectural firm Wiege and ran from Thielenplatz to the entrance of Aegidien Gate Square. The space that was opened up by the demolition of the overpass was used for additional turning lanes and also for a central bus lane.

Before the beginning of this project there was much discussion of whether the square could deal with its traffic load without the overpass. Traffic jams were predicted in all directions by many critics. The experience has been that these predictions were not correct.

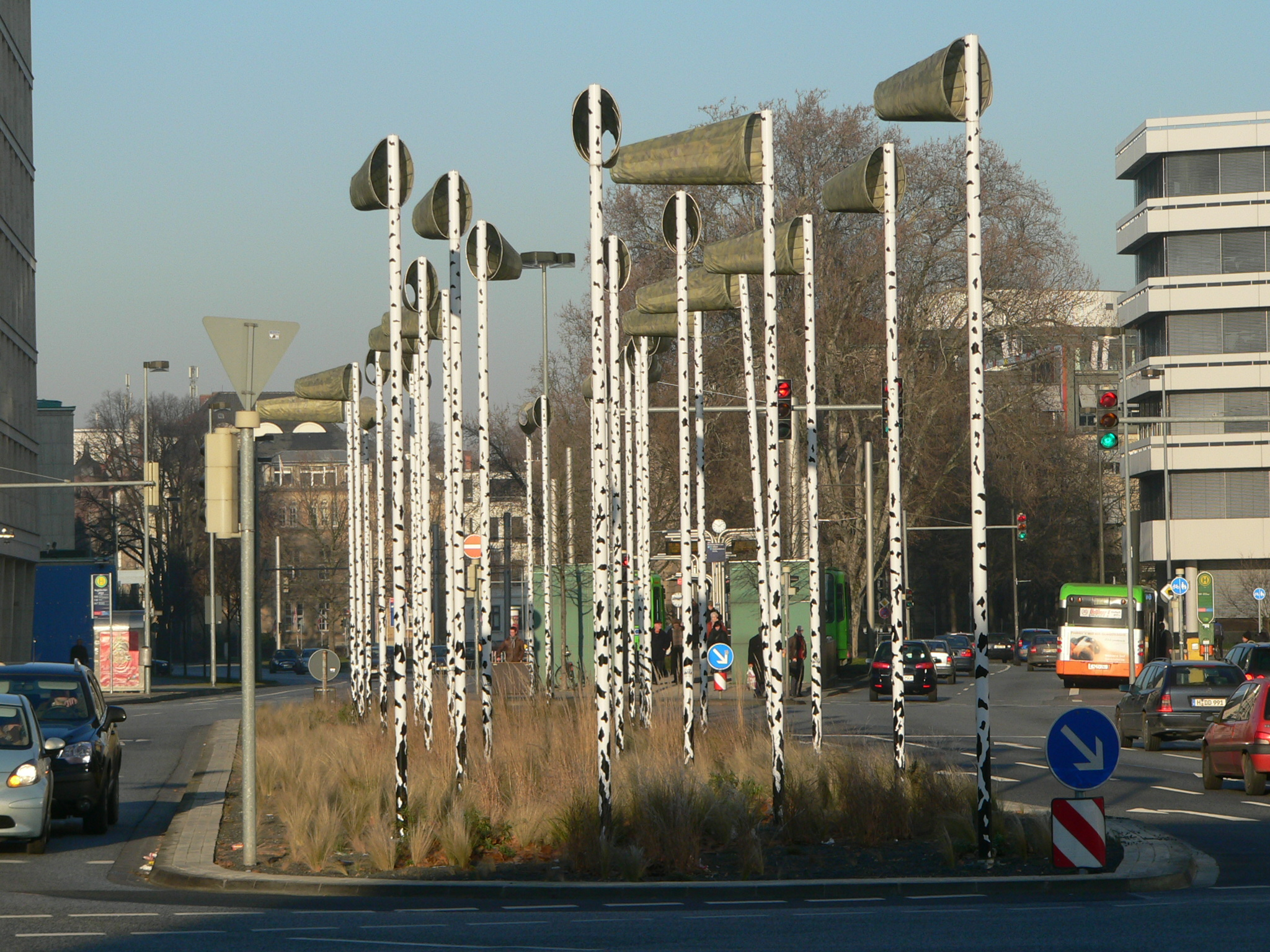
Centre of Aegidien Gate Square as a traffic island, with the Aegidien Forest (Aegidienwald), a stylised birch forest

In 2003 planning began for further renovations, which would begin in November 2004, after the waiting period for the previous project imposed by the Municipal Transport Financing Act had expired. The bus lane created in the previous project would be abandoned as far as the intersection with Hildesheimer Straße to permit an easier route for the buses. Some of the space was used for a new lane in the direction of the street Schiffgraben. The remaining space was converted into the so-called Aegidien Forest (Aegidienwald), designed by Dominik Geilker and Stefanie Schmoll, landscape architecture students at the Leibniz University Hannover, who were supervised by Professor Udo Weilacher and civil engineer Thomas Göbel-Groß. The planning and project management of the project was the responsibility of the architectural firm of Klaus Determann.

== Buildings ==
Directly at the Aegidien Gate Square is the Theatre at Aegi, built in 1953, which has been a privately operated theatre for external performances since 1994. At the northern end of the square is an office complex used by Nord/LB. The ensemble consists of five buildings, including a high-rise building with nine stories. The travertine clad buildings were erected between 1956 and 1958.

At the northeastern end of the square is the Hansa House (Hansa-Haus) between the intersections of Arnswaldtstraße and Marienstraße. This was erected in 1905–06, originally in the neo-baroque style. The Hanover savings bank, Sparkasse Hannover, established its headquarters here in 1922 and installed counters on the ground floor. The artist and architect Franz Bubenzer later lived in one of the rooms above it. It is now a listed building.

A notable example of urban planning on Aegidien Gate Square is the massive headquarters of Nord/LB. Of architectural interest is the so-called Gate House Hanover (Torhaus-Hannover) located between Marienstraße and Hildesheimer Straße. This building overhangs the sidewalk by several metres, but for structural reasons could not rest on the station below it. The weight of this portion of the building is therefore borne by large steel beams extending into the back part of the building.

On the east side of the theatre, an office building of the accounting firm Deloitte was completed in June 2014. Initially, the Hanoverian architecture firm BKSP planned an office building with nine stories, later this was raised to ten. The façade of the new building, made of white concrete and natural stone should match the old Nord/LB building opposite it. On the same location, at the intersection with Hildesheimer Straße is an office building of VGH-Versicherung from 1950.

For the bus stops of lines 100 and 120 on the square, Jasper Morrison designed functionalist stop as part of the art project Bus Stops.

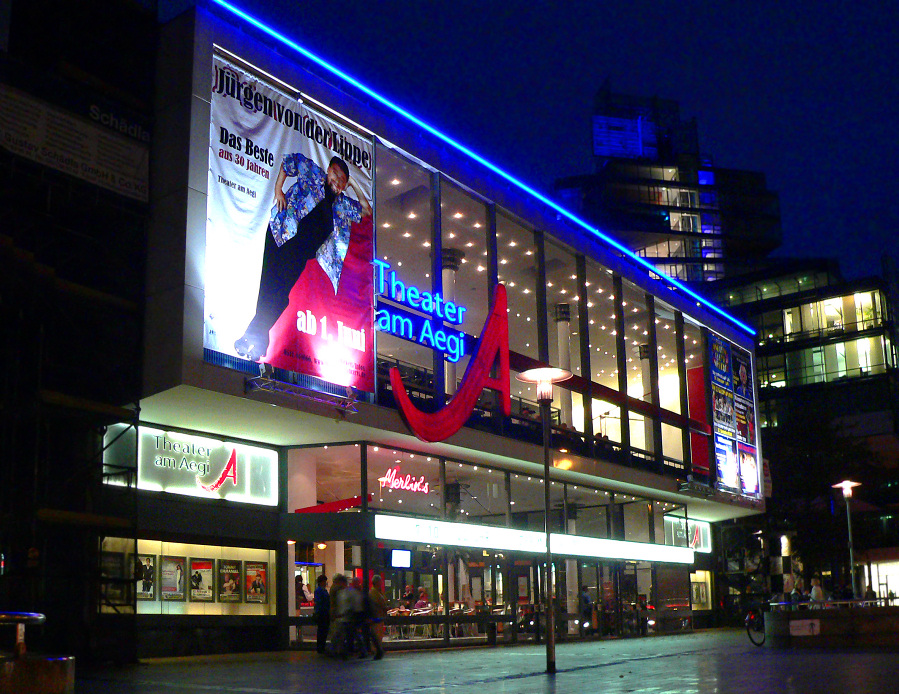
Theatre at Aegi

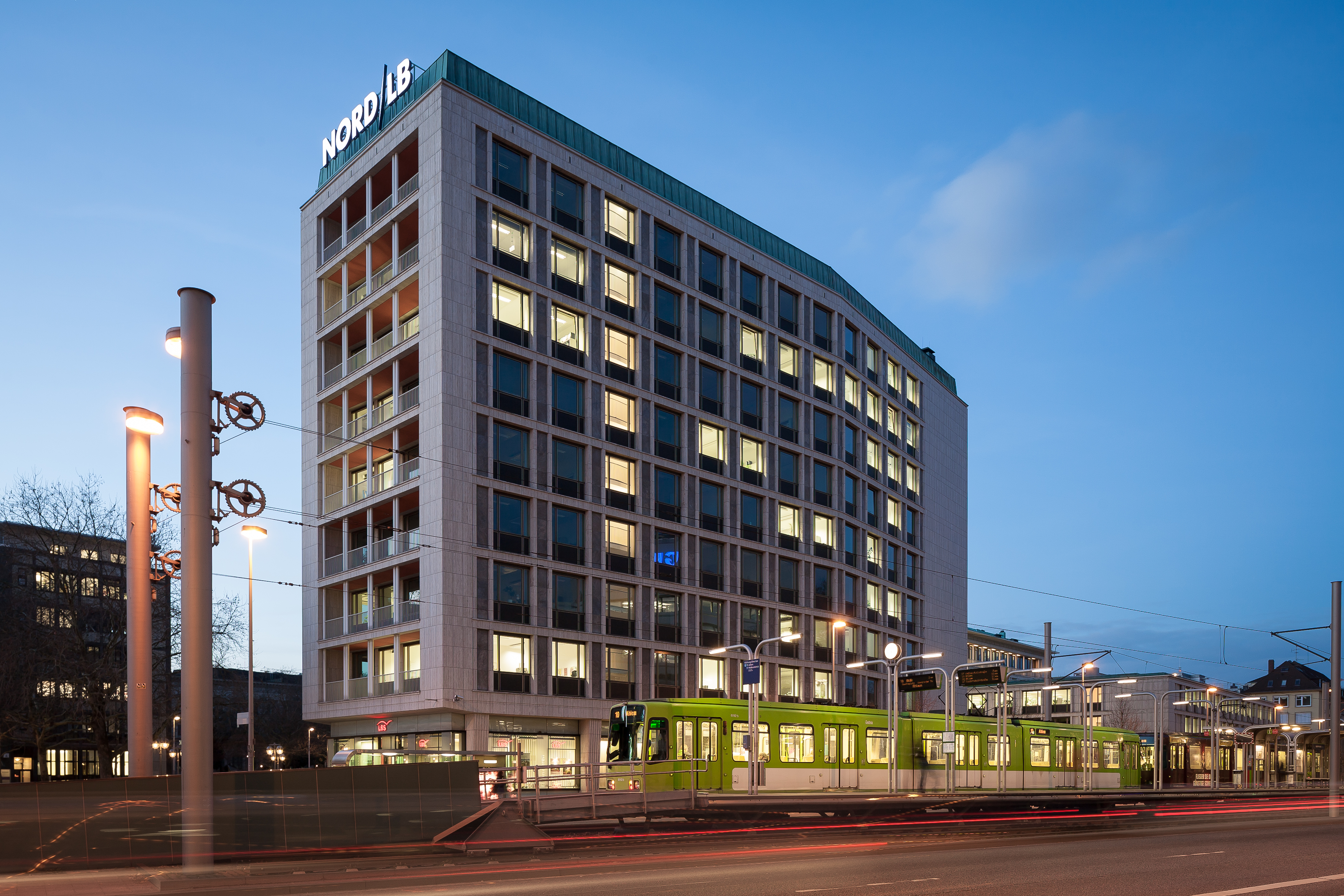
Offices of Nord/LB (1958), with the Aegidien Gate Square railway train station in front

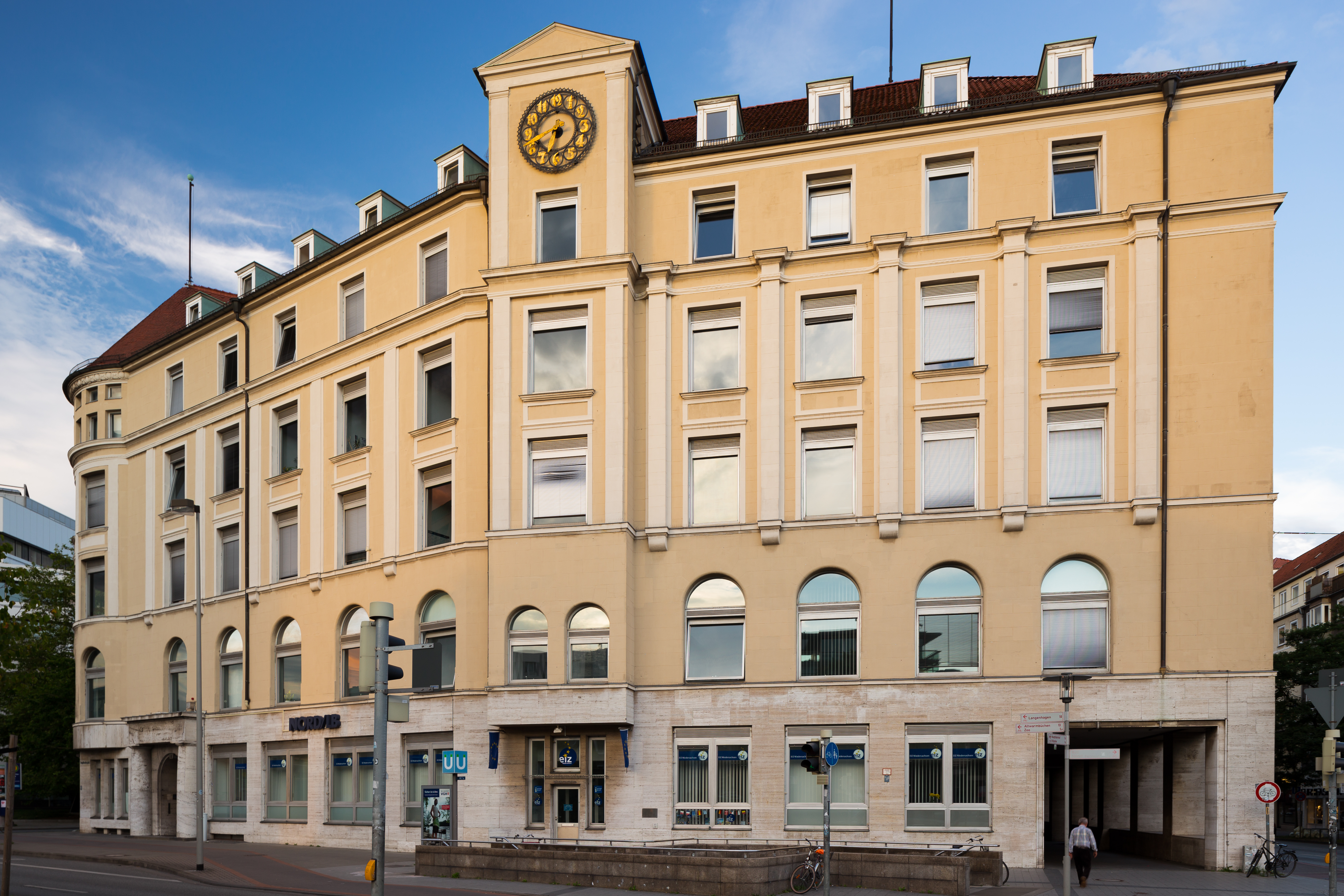
The renovated Hansa House on the northeast side of the square

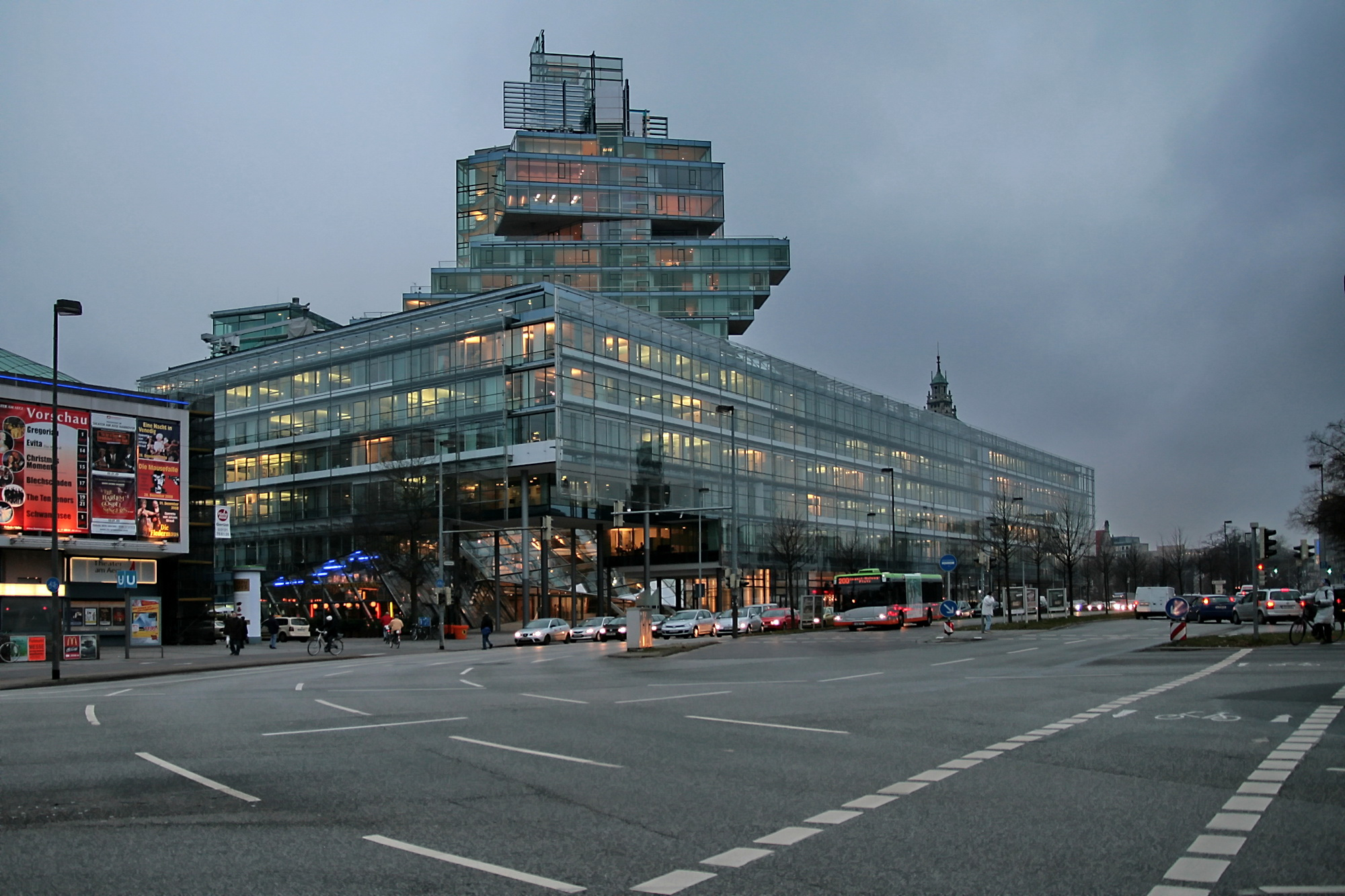
Headquarters of NORD/LB (2002)

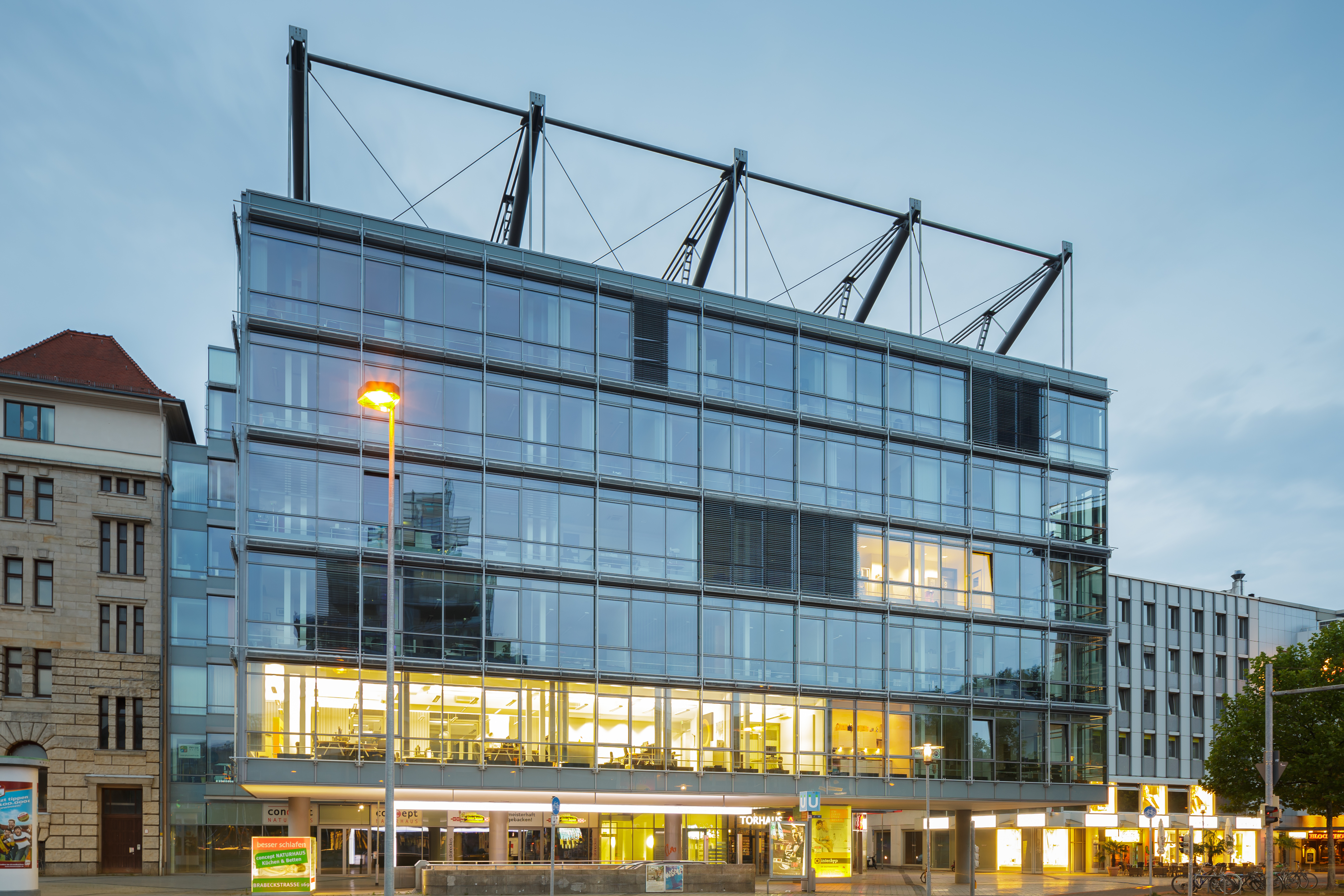
Gate House of Storch Ehlers Partner architects

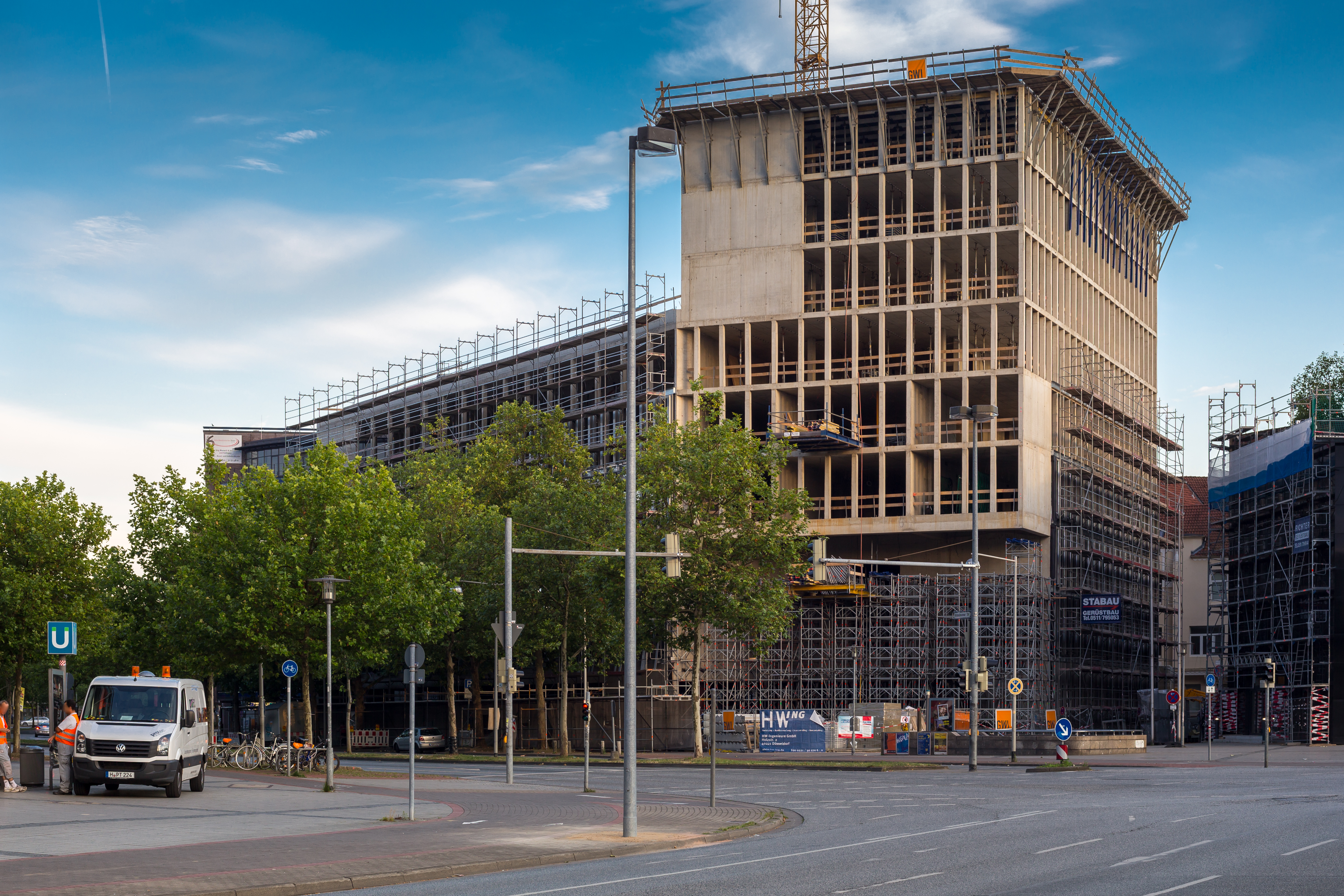
Construction site of the Deloitte-office block, July 2014

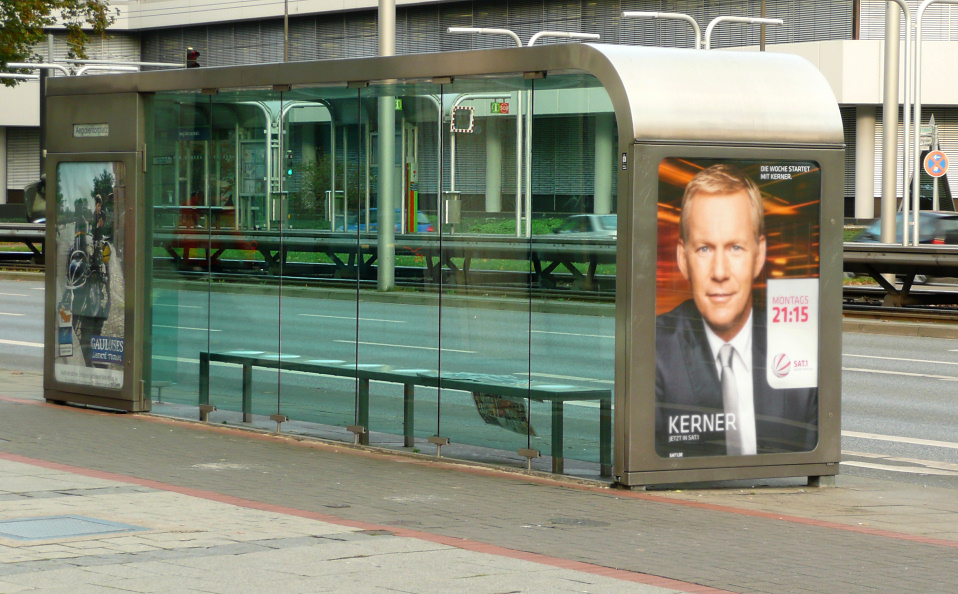
Bus stops station

== Subway station ==
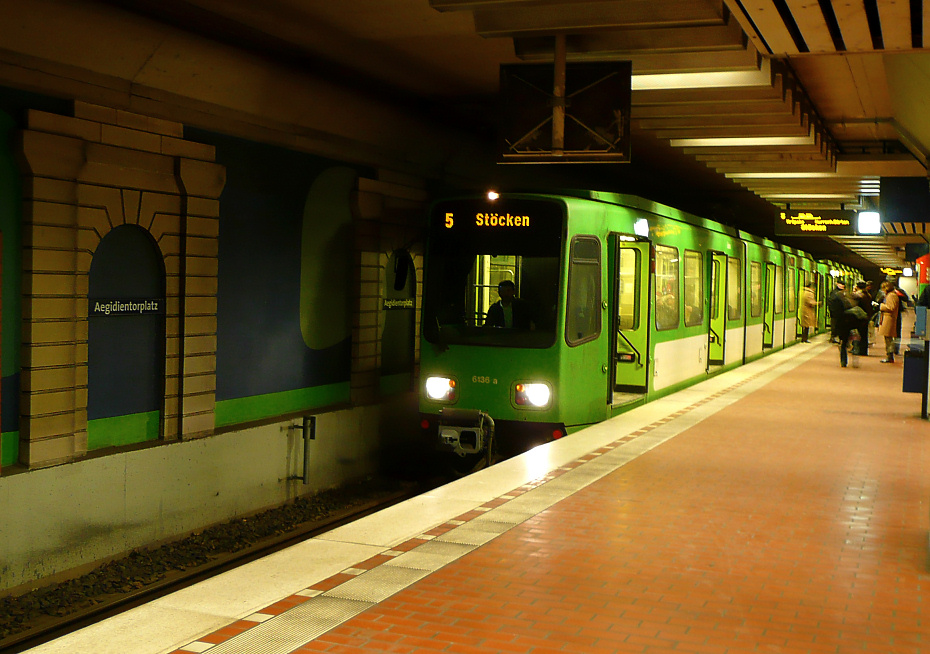
Subway station with depiction of the old gate

The Aegidien Gate Square subway station of the Hanover stadtbahn is an interchange station for the B and C lines. On two directional platforms located one above the other, it is possible to transfer without passing through any barriers.

On the lowest level (-3) the trains on lines 4, 5, 6, and 11 head from Kröpcke towards Marienstraße (C-line) and the trains on lines 1, 2 and 8 head towards Hildesheimer Straße (B-line). At the level above (-2), trains on the other lines head into the city, in the direction of Kröpcke.

On the connecting level (-1) of the station (exiting on to Hildesheimer Straße) a wall features a large reproduction of the Aegidien Gate as it appeared in 1620 according to Arnold Nöldeke's book Die Kunstdenkmale der Stadt Hannover. The walls of the station have images of the old gate as decorative elements.

== General references ==
- Arnold Nöldeke. Die Kunstdenkmale der Stadt Hannover. 1: Denkmäler des "alten" Stadtgebietes Hannover. Hannover 1932. Neudruck: Osnabrück : Wenner, 1979, pp. 41–74 (p. 61: The outer and inner Ägidientor c.1620, reconstructed view). ISBN 3-87898-151-1
- Hans Ulrich Stockmann. "Der Aegidientorplatz. Entwicklung und Veränderung eines Platzes am Rande der Innenstadt von Hannover". Hannoversche Geschichtsblätter. N.S. Vol. 35 (1981) p. 159–180.
- Dieter Tasch. Aegidientorplatz und Georgsplatz im Wandel der Zeit. Hannover: Norddeutsche Landesbank 1987.
- Helmut Knocke, Hugo Thielen. Hannover Kunst- und Kultur-Lexikon, Handbuch und Stadtführer. 3rd revised edition. Hannover: Schäfer 1995, pp. 63–64. ISBN 3-88746-313-7
- F. Eggeling. "Stadtplanung in Hannover", in Bauen und Wohnen 1956, vol 10, pp. 327ff. (esp. 331)
- Harald Koch, Franz Rudolf Zankl. Plätze in Hannover. [früher und heute] / Theater am Küchengarten. Eine Gegenüberstellung historischer Photographien und aktueller Aufnahmen von Harald Koch und Texten von Franz Rudolf Zankl, 1st edition. Theater am Küchengarten, Hannover: TAK-Verlag, 1998, ISBN 3-9806454-0-1
- Felix Zur Nedden. Hannover im Wandel; einst, gestern, heute, Hamburg: Medien-Verlag Schubert, 1998, ISBN 3-929229-57-9
- Eva Benz-Rababah. "Aegidientorplatz," in Stadtlexikon Hannover, pp. 13f.
