= Raffel =

Raffel is a surname. Notable people with the surname include:

- Burton Raffel (1928–2015), American writer, poet and academic
- Dawn Raffel, American writer
- Kanishka Raffel (born 1964), British Anglican priest in Australia
- Keith Raffel, American technology entrepreneur and writer
- Markus Raffel (born 1962), German aerospace engineer and academic
- Shan Raffel, Australian firefighter
- Suhanya Raffel, Australian art historian and museum director
- Varsha Raffel (born 1975), Indian cricketer

== See also ==
- Forrest and Leroy Raffel, founders of Arby's
