= Welfenschloss Stables =

Library at Leibniz University Hannover, Germany

Coordinates: 52°22′54.7″N 9°43′14″E

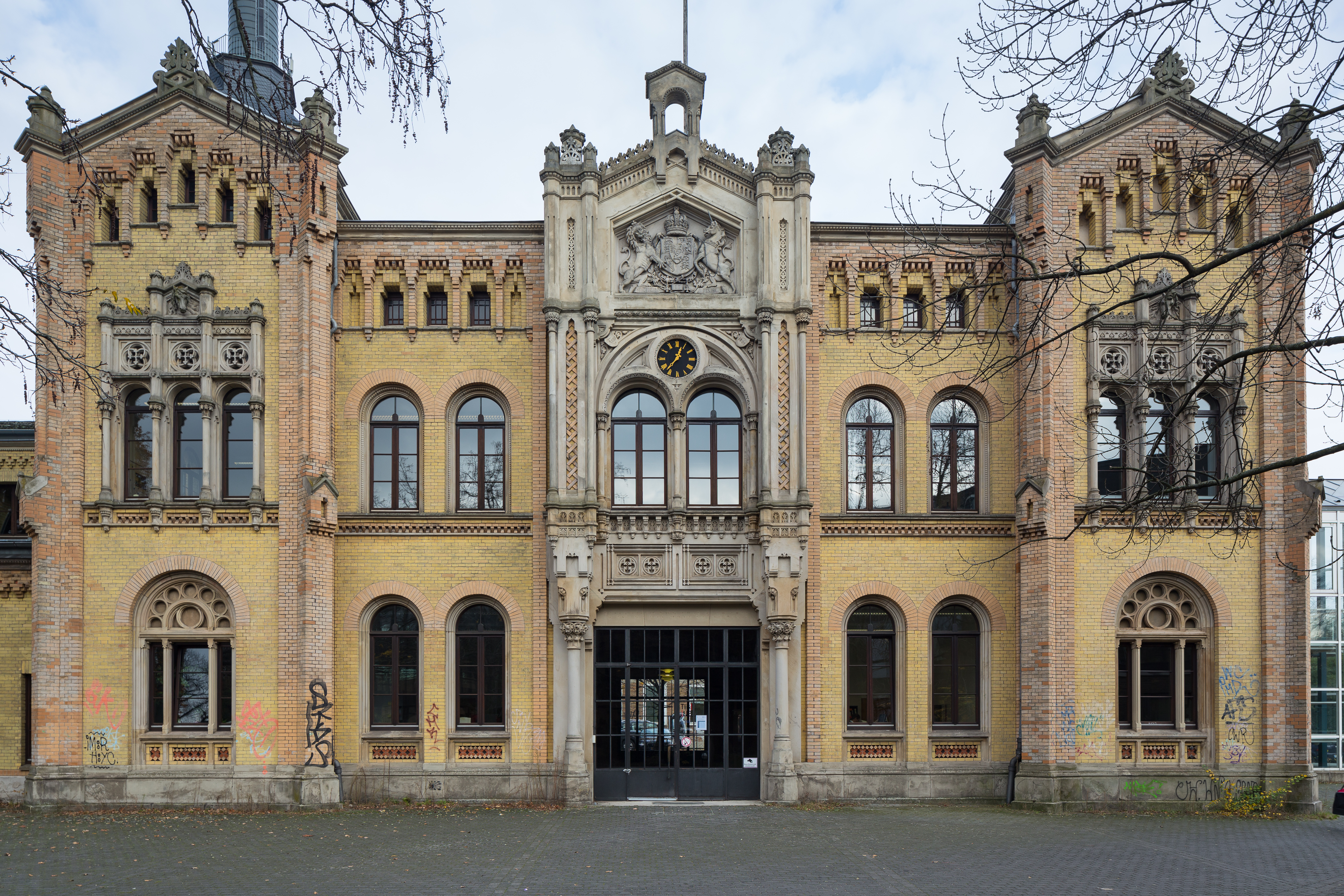
Façade of the former stables of the Guelph Palace

The Welfenschloss Stables is the residence of the Technical Information Library at the Leibniz University Hannover. It was built in 1863–1867 during the reign of the last Hanoverian king, George V as the royal stables for the Welfenschloss palace.

== Building description ==
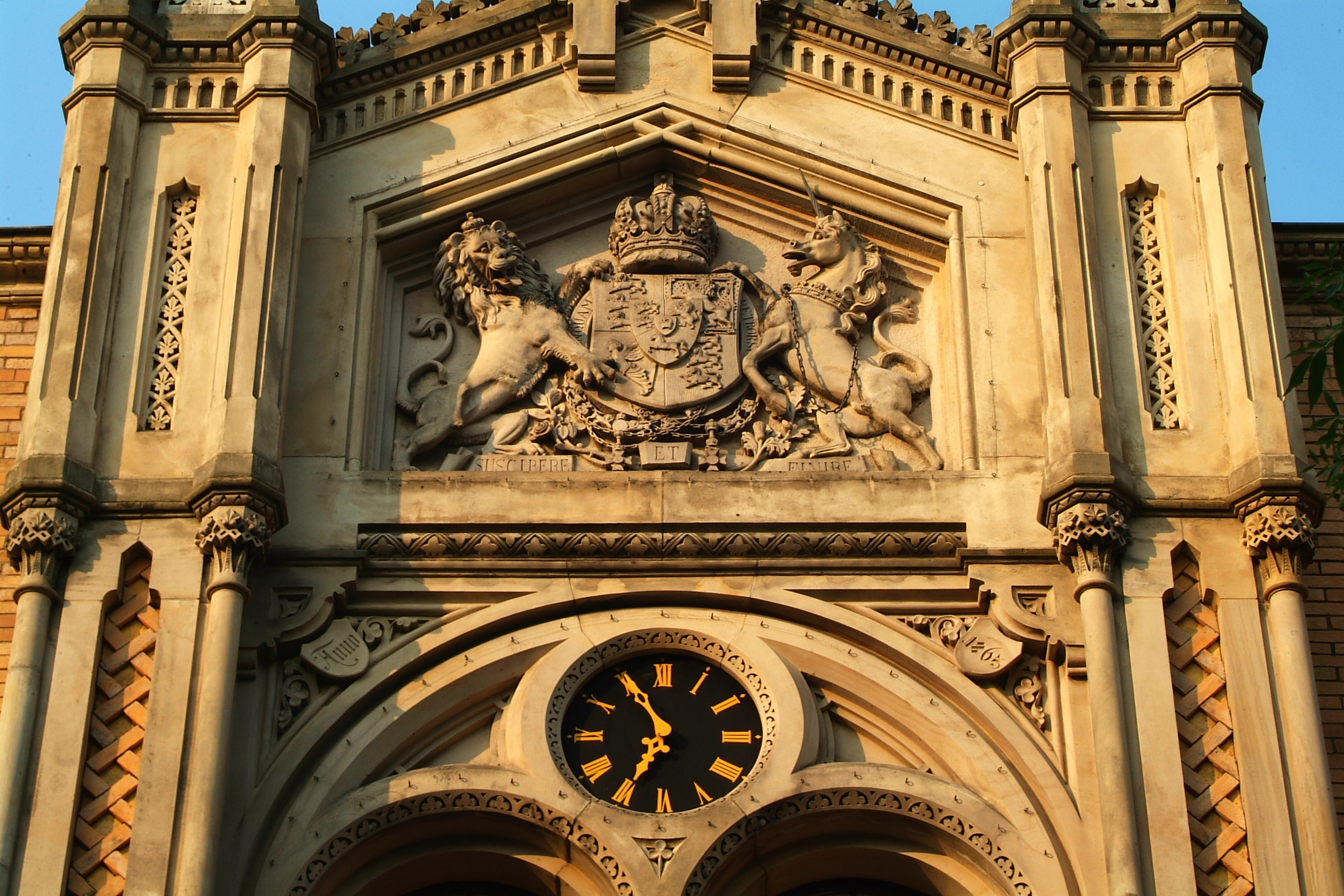
Details above the main entrance today: the royal Hanoverian coat of arms with horse and unicorn motifs.

The main body of what was originally a four-winged complex is a mixture of Rundbogenstil (essentially a German Romanesque-revival style) and English Gothic. The former horse stable was originally built in the form of a cross-section of a basilica. Following the example of Lord Pembroke's riding stables in Paris, the stables were ventilated through the upper storey windows.

The two-storey south wing, made of yellow bricks with Deister sandstone, shows side projecting pavilions and a central projecting pavilion with gothic elements. The royal Hanover coat of arms with lion and unicorn is still located above a clock above the portal.

== History ==
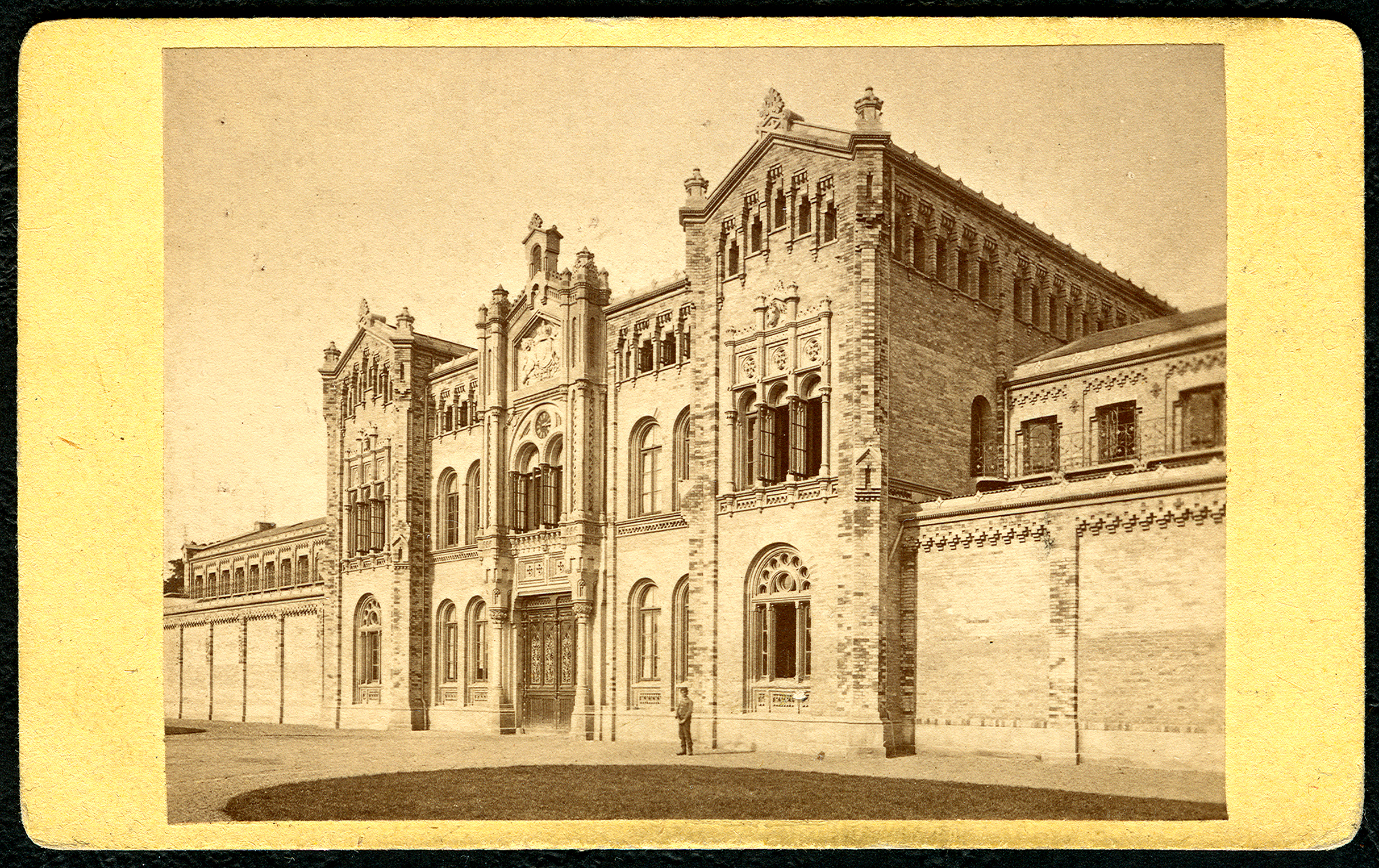
Albumen carte de visite photograph by Carl Hahne of the stables, about 1880.

The design of the stables is based on an idea by Christian Heinrich Tramm, the former court architect who had introduced the Rundbogenstil to Hanover but had died at the rather young age of 42 in 1861. His brother-in-law, the architect Eduard Heldberg, designed the building in 1863, during the final years of the Kingdom of Hanover's existence, and completed it in 1867, after the Prussian annexation of Hanover. However, apparently the king's horses themselves never lived here, due to the occupation of Hanover by Prussia during the Austro-Prussian War (or Seven Weeks War) in 1866; from then until 1912 the stable was used to house the horses of Prussian royal Uhlans instead.

Since 1912 the building has belonged to the Technical University of Hanover, which in 1913 demolished the three northern wings of the street Am Puttenser Felde in order to build a mechanical engineering laboratory with a thermal power station in their place.

The south-east wing served as a cafeteria from 1922 to 1953, which was modernized in 1935 by the professor and architect Otto Fiederling and decorated with murals by Berthold Hellingrath.

In 1953 the cafeteria was able to move into the (today's) Theodor-Lessing-Haus on the Welfengarten. In 1960 the old cafeteria in the west wing of the old stables was demolished.

From 1982 to 1986 the building, which is still preserved today, was renovated, restored and expanded by a glazed staircase by Ingeborg and Friedrich Spengelin on the eastern end. In March 1986, the Technical Information Library in the Marstall opened the PIN reading room (patents, information, standards) in the building.

== See also ==
- Royal Stables at the High Bank

== General references ==
- Kokkelink, Günther; Hammer-Schenk, Harold, eds. (1989). Laves und Hannover. Niedersächsische Architektur im 19. Jahrhundert (in German). Hanover. pp. 204–205.
- Schlitt, Gerhard (2003). "Das Marstallgebäude". In Auffarth, Sid; Pietsch, Wolfgang (eds.). Die Universität Hannover: Ihre Bauten, ihre Gärten, ihre Planungsgeschichte (in German). Petersberg: Michael Imhof Verlag. pp. 84–87, 140–142. ISBN 3-935590-90-3. OCLC 54041873.
- Knocke, Helmut (2009). Klaus Mlynek; Waldemar R. Röhrbein (eds.). Hannover City Lexicon. From the beginnings into the present (in German). Hanover: Schlütersche Verlagsgesellschaft. p. 429. ISBN 978-3-89993-662-9. OCLC 458691668. OL 45212542M. Wikidata Q2327579.
