= Winston Churchill Memorial Trusts =

Living memorials to Winston Churchill

Winston Churchill Memorial Trust
- Founded: 1 February 1965
- Purpose: Enhancing communities by providing opportunities for individuals to expand knowledge in other countries
- Location: London, UK; Canberra, Australia; Wellington, New Zealand
- Origins: Living memorial to Sir Winston Churchill
- Region served: UK, Australia, New Zealand
- Method: Travel Fellowships
- Endowment: £2.75 million (UK:1965)
- Website: churchillfellowship.org churchilltrust.com.au dia.govt.nz

Winston Churchill Memorial Trust Fellowship Medal, Obverse

Winston Churchill Memorial Trust Fellowship Medal, Reverse, Recipient name redacted

Winston Churchill Memorial Trusts (WCMT) are three independent but related living memorials to Sir Winston Churchill, based in the United Kingdom, Australia, and New Zealand. They exist for the purpose of administering Churchill Fellowships, also known as Churchill Travelling Fellowships, to provide an opportunity for applicants to travel overseas to conduct research in their chosen fields.

The Trusts were established in 1965, after the death of Churchill, by a combination of public subscription and government contributions.

The operating name of the UK Trust is The Churchill Fellowship.

== History ==
=== General ===
In 1962 Prince Philip, Duke of Edinburgh asked Churchill what type of memorial he would like the world to remember him by. He liked the idea of an unusual type of memorial, to be set up after his death, and suggested something like the Rhodes Scholarships, but available to everybody, on a wider basis. The concept was developed jointly by the English-Speaking Unions of the Commonwealth and of the United States. Several countries planned a nationwide appeal after Churchill's to set up a National Churchill Trust. The plans were kept secret at Lady Churchill’s request until after his death.

The Trusts were founded to "perpetuate and honour the memory of Sir Winston Churchill" by administering the award of travelling fellowships known as Churchill Fellowships.

An attempt in 1964 by then Canadian Prime Minister Lester B. Pearson and former Canadian High Commissioner to the United Kingdom George A. Drew to launch a fourth Trust in Canada did not come to fruition, in part due to the illness and death of the latter.

In 2019 The Queen granted permission for Churchill Fellows to use the post-nominal honorific CF; in 2021 the Trusts adopted the operating name of the Churchill Fellowship.

=== UK ===
The UK Trust was founded on 1 February 1965, the day after Churchill's funeral. Queen Elizabeth II extended her Royal Patronage to the Trust in 1965.

=== Australia ===
Before Churchill's death, planning for the fund-raising appeal for the establishment of a Churchill Trust in Australia continued under the code name Operation “G” (for Gratitude), under the leadership of (later Sir) William John Kilpatrick. Immediately on the announcement of Churchill's death on 24 January 1965, a nationwide appeal for funds was launched by Prime Minister Robert Menzies, with Kilpatrick as Chairman of the Appeal Committee. Commonwealth and State Governments as well as Australian companies and individuals donated generously. The Returned Services League performed a nationwide doorknock on Sunday 28 of February, which raised £911,000. A total of £2,206,000 was raised, and the Winston Churchill Memorial Trust founded to administer the funds.

== Description ==
=== General ===
The recipients organise their own travel and undertake their own research. Upon their return, they submit a report to the Trustees. Once their report is accepted, they are formally installed as Fellows and receive their insignia, consisting of a specially minted Churchill Medal, at a national award ceremony. Applicants must be citizens of the respective country and the research must necessitate foreign travel.

An implication taken from the award of a Fellowship is that the recipient is a leader or has potential leadership in their field of endeavour, and that the Fellowship will strengthen their usefulness to society. They are encouraged to promote the Fellowships, encouraging others to apply, and thus perpetuating the memory of Churchill.

=== UK ===
The UK Trust, situated in London, award 150 travelling fellowships to fund successful applicants' travel for four to eight weeks anywhere in the world, researching their chosen topic among global leaders in their field. Upon return, the organisation helps the Fellows to share their learning with professions and communities across the country. They are not academic research grants, but intended for practical research into real-world issues, covering eight themes: Arts and culture; community and citizenship; economy and enterprise; education and skills; environment and resources; health and wellbeing; governance and public provision; and science and technology.

In 2019 the Patron of the Winston Churchill Memorial Trust (UK), Her Majesty Queen Elizabeth II, granted the use of the post-nominal letters "CF" (for "Churchill Fellow") to recipients of the award. The stated aim of the honorific is 'to mark the contribution of Churchill Fellows to national life'. In 2021 the Trusts adopted the operating name of The Churchill Fellowship.

=== Australia ===
The Australian WCMT has chapters with regional committees in each state and territory, with the national office at Churchill House in Canberra. All directors and regional committee members serve in an honorary capacity.

The aim of the fellowships is to "provide an opportunity for Australians to travel overseas to conduct research in their chosen field that is not readily available in Australia...with further opportunity in their pursuit of excellence for the enrichment of Australian society". There are no prescriptions as to theme or topic.

Recipients of Churchill Fellowships are entitled to use the post-nominal letters CF upon completion of their fellowship.

=== New Zealand ===
The New Zealand WCMT is administered by the Department of Internal Affairs. Lieutenant-General Sir Jerry Mateparae, former Governor-General of New Zealand, is patron of the Trust, which assists fellows to travel overseas for a period of from three weeks to three months to investigate topics in their trade, industry, profession or business, that will help them to increase their contribution to the community and their field back in New Zealand.

== Notable fellows by country and year ==
=== United Kingdom ===
Year	Fellow	Occupation / profession	Purpose / project / findings	Location of study
1967	Dr. Mary Remnant	Musicologist	Brought back to life, in reconstructed form, the sound of medieval musical instruments depicted on church walls and in carvings across Europe.	Europe
1971	Christopher J. Walker	Historian	"...to write a history of modern Armenia".	Armenia
1976	Dr. Jane Wilson-Howarth	Ecologist	Discovered numerous species that were new to science and named one, a springtail, Troglopedetes churchillatus in honour of Churchill.	Nepal
1981	John Elkington	Business author	Environmental industry and its use in implementing the World Conservation Strategy.	United States
1982	Nick Danziger	Travel artist and author	Travelling on foot and by traditional local transport, Danziger traversed from western Europe to China, and published Danziger's Travels as a result.	Western Europe and China
1983	Harold Cudmore	Olympic sailor and yachtsman	Developing tactics for match racing	Bahamas and United States
1988	Charles Farthing	Medical doctor	Studied AIDS at the Bellevue Hospital in New York	United States
1989	Serge Lourie	Housing Association chair	Studied urban renewal and housing in order to help tackle the housing crisis in the United Kingdom	France and United States
2000	Paul Darke	Academic and disability rights activist	Exploring disability access to pilgrimages and shrines	France and Spain
2026	Dr. Andrew Murphy	Renewable energy executive	Developed Trust by Design, a consent framework for clean energy infrastructure.	Norway, Japan and Chile

=== Australia ===
Year	Fellow	Occupation / profession	Purpose / project / findings	Location of study
1972	Lionel Gilbert	Lecturer and curator	To study the educational use of museums in the UK	UK
1972	Rob Morrison	Zoology researcher	To examine the administration of Field Study Centres and the courses offered in same	UK
1984	Roger McNeice	Numismatist	To study developments in the conservation and preservation of coins and medals.	UK
2008	Dr Elizabeth Grant	Architect, anthropologist and academic, University of Adelaide	To study the design of prisons for Indigenous prisoners	Denmark, US, Canada, New Zealand
2009	Sarah Maddison	Social scientist and academic	To study models of Indigenous representation	US and Canada
2009	Shan Raffel	Firefighter	To study emergency planning, preparation and response to fires and other incidents in large tunnels	Germany, Denmark, Norway, Austria, Switzerland, Sweden, Canada, US
2016	Lindy W. Cayzer	Botanist	To unlock critical taxonomic information on the Pittosporaceae in overseas herbaria	Indonesia, Malaysia, Singapore, Netherlands, France, UK
2017	Garry Stewart	Choreographer	To undertake a comparative study of seven major international choreographic centres	Canada, France, India, Netherlands, UK, US
2017	Anthea Williams	Theatre and film director	To research the best play, writer and audience development models in English speaking theatres	Canada, United Kingdom, US
2019	Jared Thomas	Writer and museum curator	To investigate colonised people's interpretative strategies in permanent gallery displays	New Zealand, US, Canada, Norway
2020	Dr Hannah McGlade	Academic, human rights advocate and lawyer	To investigate the establishment and foundation of the Sami parliaments particularly the extent of their vested power, responsibility and representative structure	Finland, Norway, Sweden

=== New Zealand ===
Year	Fellow	Occupation / profession	Purpose / project / findings	Location of study
1973	Don Merton	Conservationist	To study the management of endangered species	US and Europe
1991	Eve Coxon	Education academic	To study educational environments and the factors that contribute to educational success and/or failure among Pacific Island pupils in Auckland schools.	Rarotonga and Western Samoa
2015	Jane Tolerton	Historian	To gather information for a book on New Zealand women's work in the First World War	United Kingdom
2017	Taiaroa Royal	Choreographer	To undertake choreographic research with Exhale Dance Tribe to start developing a united choreographic language and voice	Cincinnati
2018	Richard Davies	General practitioner	To study medical clinics providing services to the homeless and vulnerable	United Kingdom
2021	Veronika Meduna	Science journalist	To carry out research for a book on the settlement of the Pacific	Micronesia, Melanesia and Australia

== See also ==
- International Churchill Society
