= Leibniz University Hannover =

Public university in Germany

- Leibniz Universität Hannover
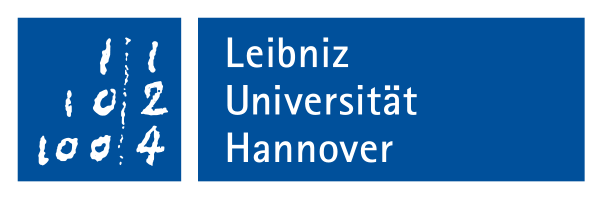
- Former names: Höhere Gewerbeschule (1831); Polytechnische Schule (1847); Königliche Technische Hochschule (1879); Technische Hochschule Hannover (1921); Technische Universität Hannover (1968); University of Hannover (1978)
- Motto: Global denken, interdisziplinär forschen: Leibniz leben!
- Motto in English: Global thinking, interdisciplinary research: the spirit of Leibniz!
- Type: Public
- Established: 2 May 1831; 195 years ago
- Affiliations: TU9; TIME; CESAER Association
- Budget: EUR 614.7 million
- President: Volker Epping
- Academic staff: 3,438
- Administrative staff: 1,838
- Students: 27,229
- Location: Hanover, Lower Saxony, Germany; 52°22′56″N 9°43′04″E
- Website: uni-hannover.de

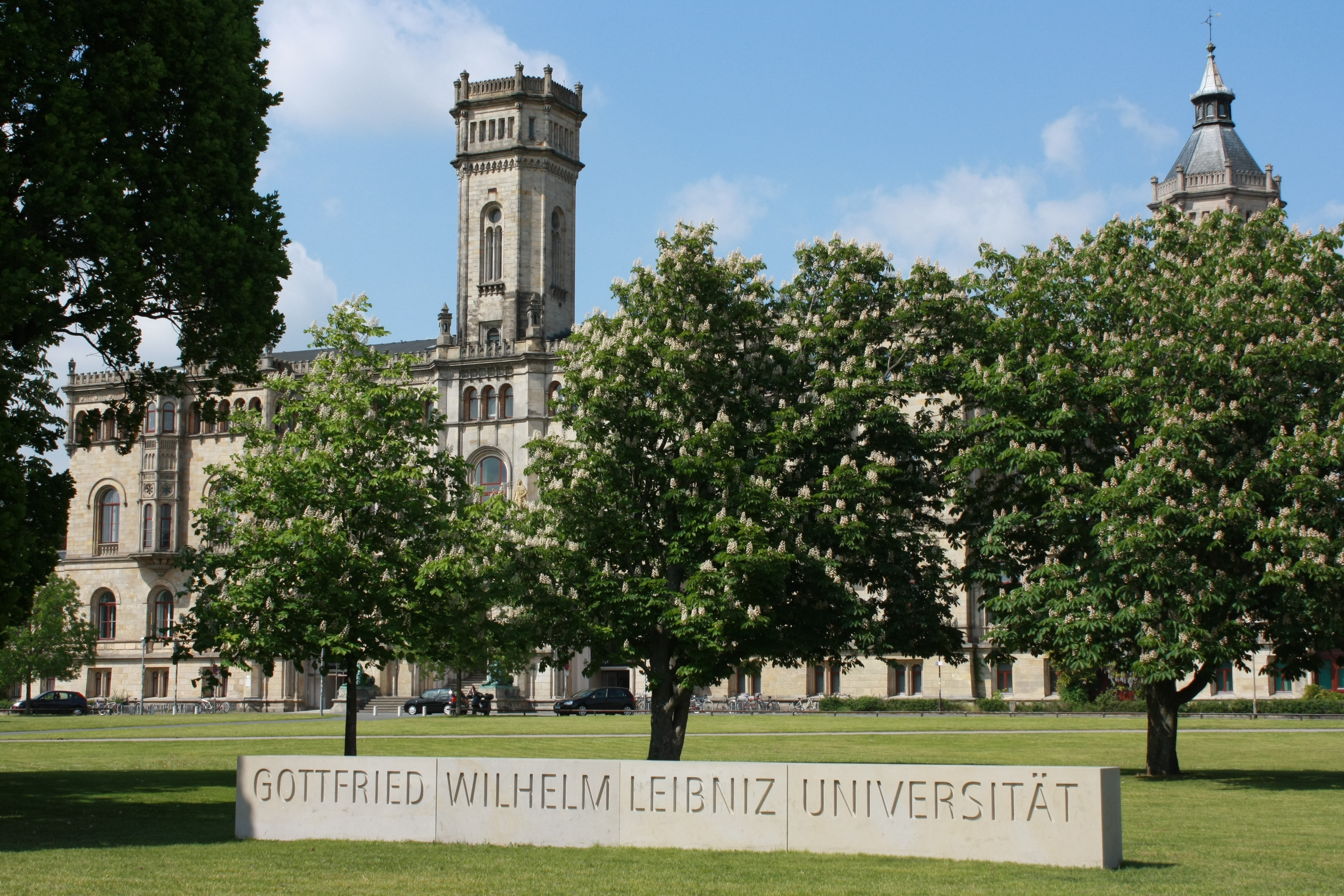
The Welfenschloss palace, the main building of Leibniz University Hannover; designed by Christian Heinrich Tramm

Leibniz University Hannover (German: Leibniz Universität Hannover), also known as the University of Hannover, is a public research university located in Hanover, Germany. Founded on 2 May 1831 as Higher Vocational School, the university has undergone six periods of renaming, its most recent in 2006.

Leibniz University Hannover is a member of TU9, an association of the nine leading Institutes of Technology in Germany. It is also a member of the Conference of European Schools for Advanced Engineering Education and Research, a non-profit association of leading engineering universities in Europe. The university sponsors the German National Library of Science and Technology, the largest science and technology library in the world.

== History ==
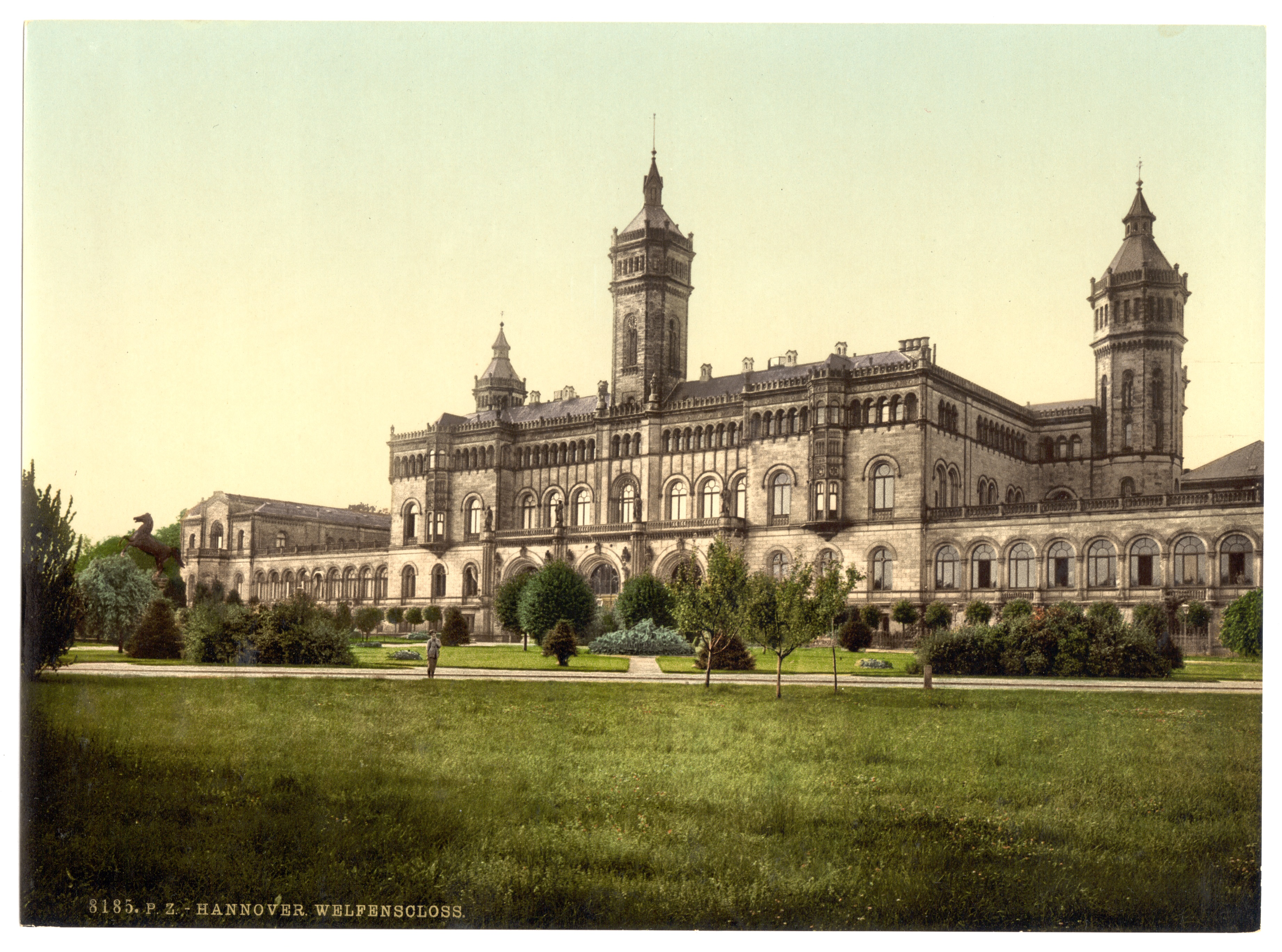
The Königliche Technische Hochschule, around 1900

The roots of the university begin in the Higher Vocational College/Polytechnic Institute (Höhere Gewerbeschule/Polytechnische Schule), founded on 2 May 1831. In 1879 the Higher Vocational School moved into the historic Guelph palace (Welfenschloss), which was specially converted for the purpose.

On 1 April 1879, the Higher Vocational School became the Royal College of Technology (Königliche Technische Hochschule). In 1899 Kaiser Wilhelm II granted the College of Technology a status equal to that of universities and the right to confer doctorates. The college was reconstructed in 1921 with the financial support of the College Patrons' Association. As of 1 July 1922, there were three faculties: Mathematics and Natural Sciences, Civil Engineering, and Mechanical Engineering.

In 1968 the Faculty of Humanities and Political Science were founded and the Technische Hochschule ('Technical College' or 'Technical University') became the Technische Universität Hannover ('Technical University Hannover').

Between 1973 and 1980 the faculties of Law, Business and Economics, and the formerly independent Teachers Training College were added to the university and in 1978 the Technische Universität Hannover was renamed Universität Hannover ('University of Hannover'). Student numbers exceeded 30,000 for the first time in 1991.

On the 175th anniversary of the institution in 2006, the 'University of Hannover' was given the name Gottfried Wilhelm Leibniz Universität Hannover, or Leibniz Universität Hannover for short. While 64 students first attended the Vocational School, today the university has around 27,200 students, more than 3,400 academics and scientists, and 160 departments and institutes.

== Namesake ==
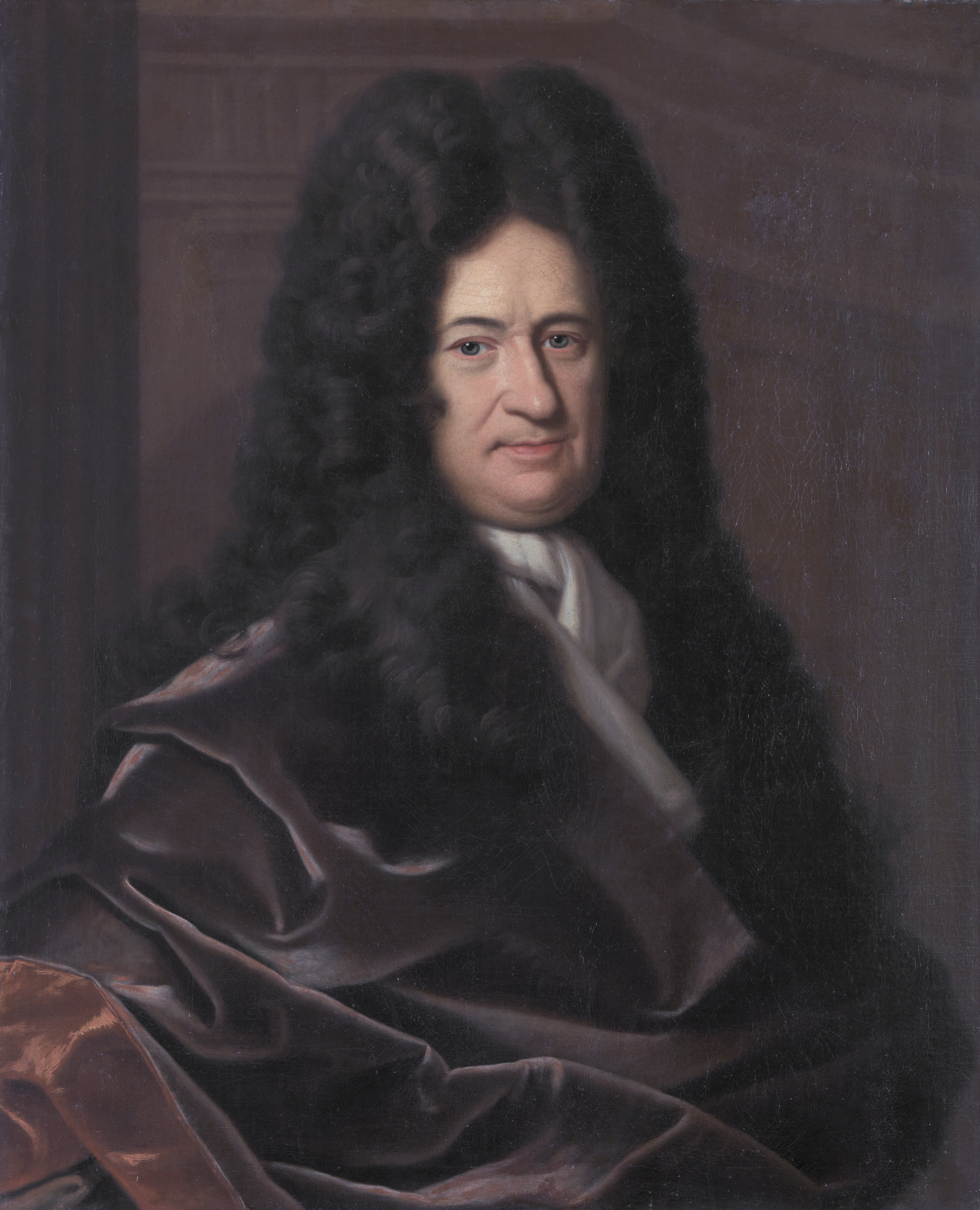
Gottfried Wilhelm Leibniz

The Senate of the university voted in April 2006 to rename the University of Hannover to Leibniz Universität Hannover. Following agreement by the Leibniz Academy on the use of the name, the Gottfried Wilhelm Leibniz Universität Hannover received its name on the 360th anniversary of Gottfried Wilhelm Leibniz's birth. The brand of the university is Leibniz Universität Hannover.

The old logo of the university was inspired by the Massachusetts Institute of Technology. The current logo, adopted in 2008, is a stylised excerpt from a letter to Duke Rudolf August of Wolfenbüttel, in which Leibniz presented binary numbers for the first time.

== Faculties and staff ==
Nine faculties with more than 190 first-degree full-time and part-time degree courses make the university the second-largest institution of higher education in Lower Saxony. The university staff comprises 3438 research and teaching staff, of whom 357 are professors. It has 1838 additional employees in administrative functions, 58 apprentices and some 1900 staff funded by third parties.

- Faculty of Architecture and Landscape Sciences
- Faculty of Civil Engineering and Geodetic Science
- Faculty of Economics and Management
- Faculty of Electrical Engineering and Computer Science
- Faculty of Humanities
- Faculty of Law
- Faculty of Mathematics and Physics
- Faculty of Mechanical Engineering
- Faculty of Natural Sciences
- QUEST Leibniz Research School
- Leibniz School of Education
- Leibniz School of Optics and Photonics

== Facilities ==
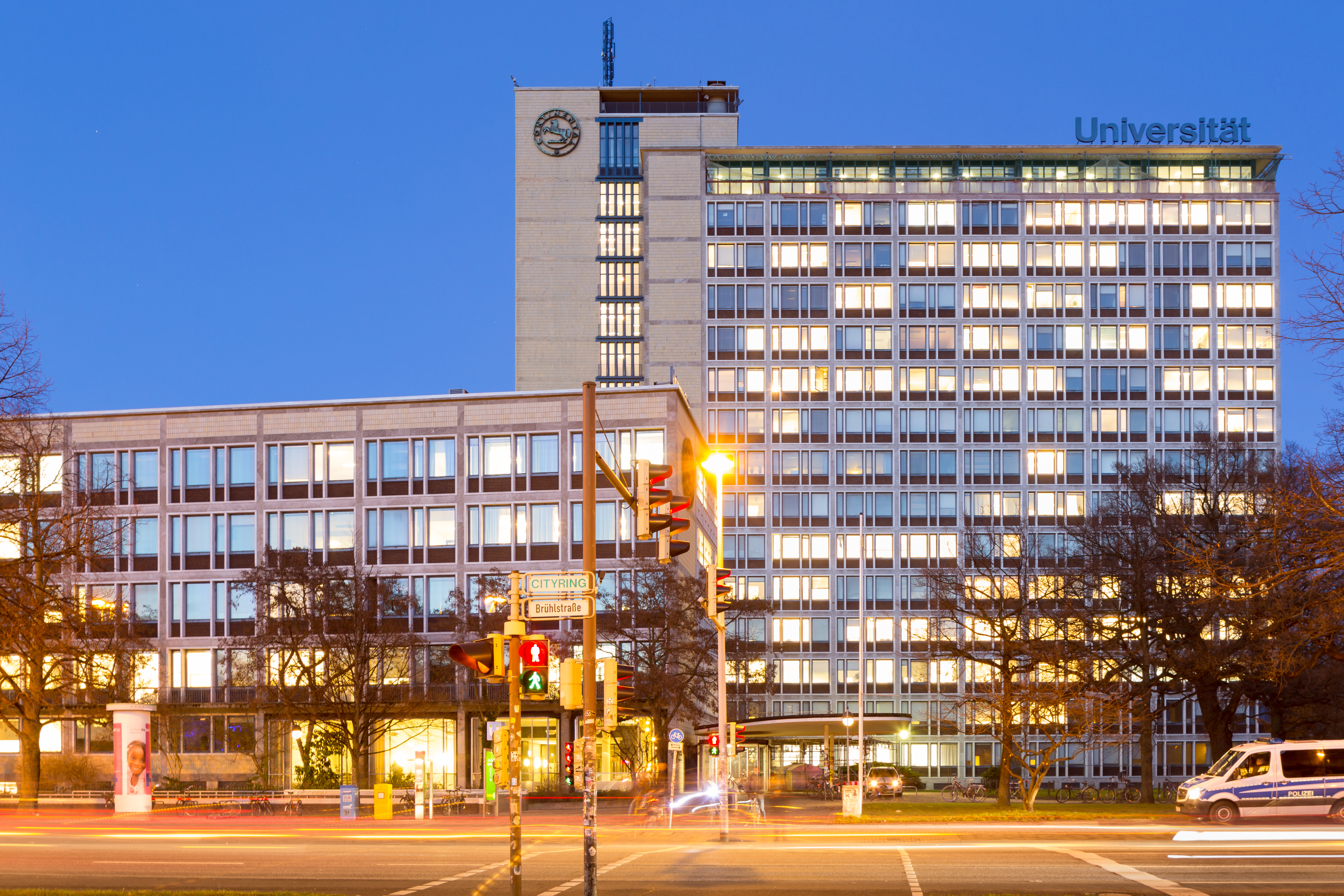
The Conti-Tower on the Königsworther Platz, home to the law, economics and linguistics faculties

The campus of the university is spread over 160 buildings occupying 322,700 square metres (79.7 acres) of floor space. The university also houses the Einstein-Elevator, a zero gravity research facility.

== Budget ==
The university's overall budget was approximately €441.8M in 2013, broken down as follows:

- Income of €222.6M according to the annual report
- External funding amounting to €101.8M
- Special funds from the State of Lower Saxony amounting to €58.3M
- €42.3M from other income
- €16.8M from student contributions

== Rankings ==
University rankings

Overall – Global & National
QS World 2024	481	30
THE World 2024	351–400	34–36
ARWU World 2023	501-600	32-36

As per the QS World 2024, the university is placed 481st globally and holds the 30th position nationally. In the THE World 2024 rankings, the university is placed within the 351–400 range globally, and holds a national rank within the 34–36 range. According to the ARWU World 2022, the university's global position is within the 501–600 range, while nationally it ranks between 32nd and 36th.

Measured by the number of top managers in the German economy, Leibniz University Hannover ranked 7th in 2019.

Leibniz University Hannover ranked 34th place worldwide in the THE Impact Rankings 2023 – SDG 6 (Clean Water and Sanitation) and between 101–200 in the SDG 7 (Affordable and Clean Energy) rankings.

== University library and TIB ==
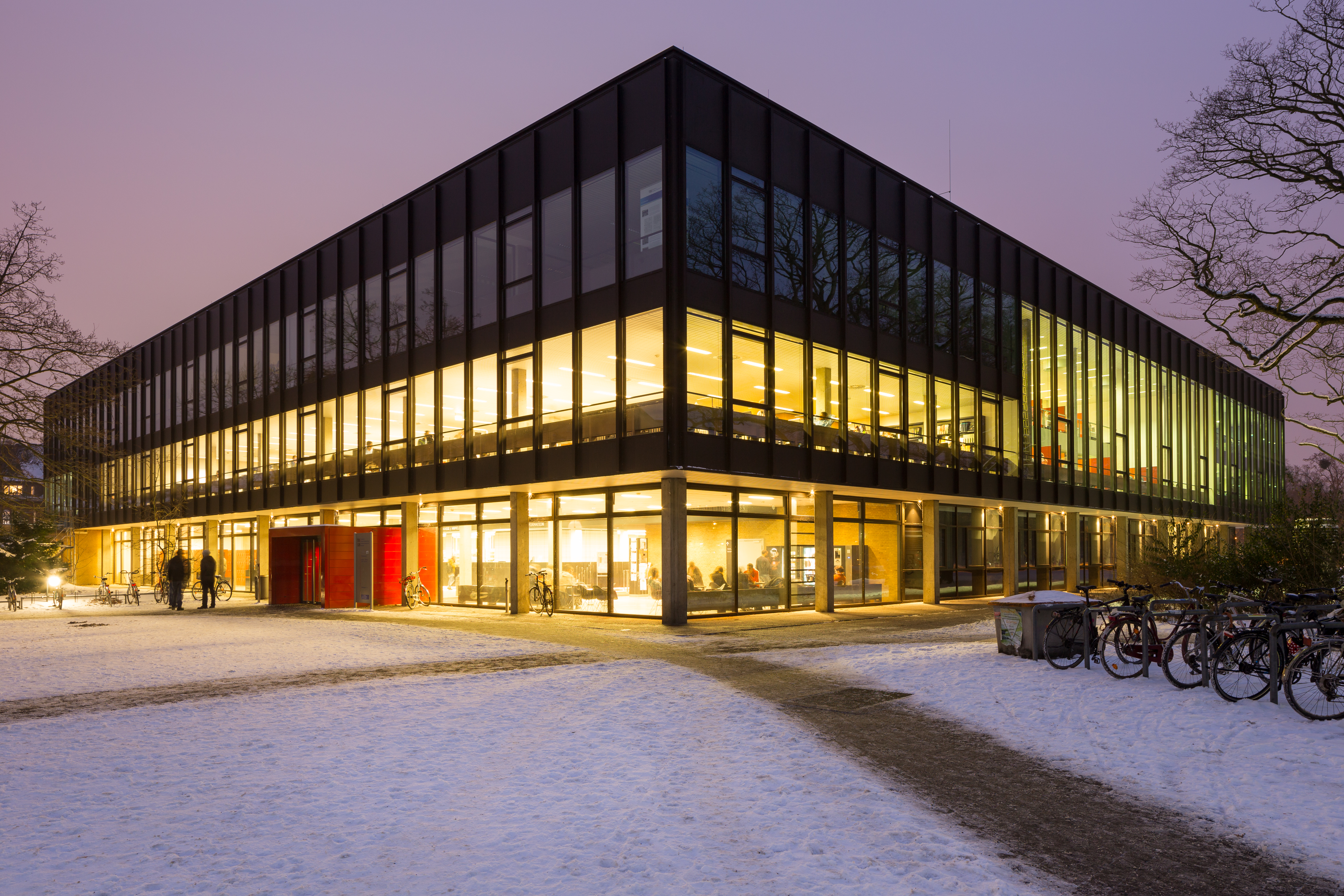
The German National Library of Science and Technology in Welfengarten

The library was established on the founding of the Höhere Gewerbeschule/Polytechnische Schule in 1831. It expanded into an important collection as the institution evolved from a vocational/technical college into the full university. The removal of the books into storage during the Second World War secured valuable old stocks that became a unique national collection of scientific and technical literature in postwar Germany. This was the basis on which the library of the Institute of Technology (Technische Informationsbibliothek) was established in 1959. Today the collection forms the heart of the German National Library of Science and Technology, which is the largest institution of its kind in the world.

== GISMA School of Business ==
GISMA Business School in Hannover, Germany, was launched in 1999 as a joint initiative by the state of Lower Saxony and visionary private-sector enterprises. The school was closely affiliated with the Krannert School of Management at Purdue University (Indiana, US) until 2011 when the Leibniz University Hannover briefly became its parent. In 2013 the association with Leibniz ended, and GISMA became part the for-profit education company Global University Systems.

== Notable people ==
=== Faculty ===
- Friedrich Bergius (1884–1949), chemist, Nobel Prize in Chemistry (1931)
- Helmut Bley (born 1935), German historian, professor
- Constantin Carathéodory (1873–1950), mathematician, professor
- Lothar Collatz (1910-1990), chair in applied mathematics at the technical university of Hanover (1943-1952)
- Horst Dreier (born 1954), lawyer
- Gerhard Ertl (born 1936), physicist and chemist, Nobel Prize in Chemistry (2007)
- J. Hans D. Jensen (1907–1973), German physicist, Nobel Prize in Physics (1963)
- Wilhelm Jordan, (1842–1899), professor of geodesy and practical geometry, known for the Gauss-Jordan Elimination
- Karl Karmarsch (1803–1879), engineer, educationalist
- Helmut Kentler (1928-2008) German psychologist, sexologist, and primary author of the Kentler Experiment
- Theodor Lessing (1872–1933), philosopher
- Herbert Lindinger (born 1933), industrial designer
- Konrad Meyer (1901–1973), SS-Oberführer and an architect of Generalplan Ost for the Germanization of Eastern Europe. Later served as a professor of agriculture and regional planning at the University of Hanover
- Oskar Negt (1934–2024), social philosopher
- Werner Osenberg (1900–1974), materials scientist
- Eduard Pestel (1914–1988), engineer and politician
- Ludwig Prandtl (1875–1953), physicist and engineer in fluid- and aerodynamics, professor.
- Markus Raffel (born 1962), engineer in fluid- and aerodynamics, professor.
- Friedrich Schwerd (1872–1953), professor for machinery and operations research, inventor of the WW I. German army Stahlhelm
- Fritz Sennheiser, (1912–2010), electronics engineer, entrepreneur: Honorary professorship.
- Klaus Töpfer (1938–2024), German politician (Christian Democratic Union)

=== Alumni ===
- Carl F. W. Borgward (1890–1963), entrepreneur, car manufacturer, engineer, non-graduate guest auditor.
- Walter Bruch (1908–1990), electronics and television engineer, honorary doctorate.
- Alfred Bucherer (1863–1927), physicist
- Wilhelm Busch (1832–1908), poet and artist
- Rento Hofstede Crull (1863–1938), electrical pioneer
- Gustav Doetsch (1892–1977), German mathematician gained his Habilitation here
- Luise Druke (born 1948), German scholar and United Nations practitioner
- Irmgard Flügge-Lotz (1903–1974), German-American mathematician and engineer
- Henrich Focke (1890–1979), German aviation pioneer
- Erich Gutenberg (1897–1984), German economist.
- Maximilian Emil Hehl (1861–1916), German Architect who emigrated to Brazil and designed the Neo-Gothic São Paulo Cathedral
- Pascual Jordan (1902–1980), theoretical and mathematical physicist, politician (CDU)
- Wolfgang Jüttner (born 1948), German politician (SPD)
- Carola Lentz (born 1954), German social anthropologist
- David McAllister (born 1971), German politician (CDU)
- Christian Otto Mohr (1835–1918), civil and structural engineer
- Carl Adam Petri (1926–2010), mathematician, logician and computer scientist
- Frank Pohlmann (born 1959), American politician and businessman
- Reinhold Rudenberg (1883–1961), Head of the Department of Electrical Engineering at the Harvard Graduate School of Engineering, inventor of i.e. carrier current communications

== Panorama ==
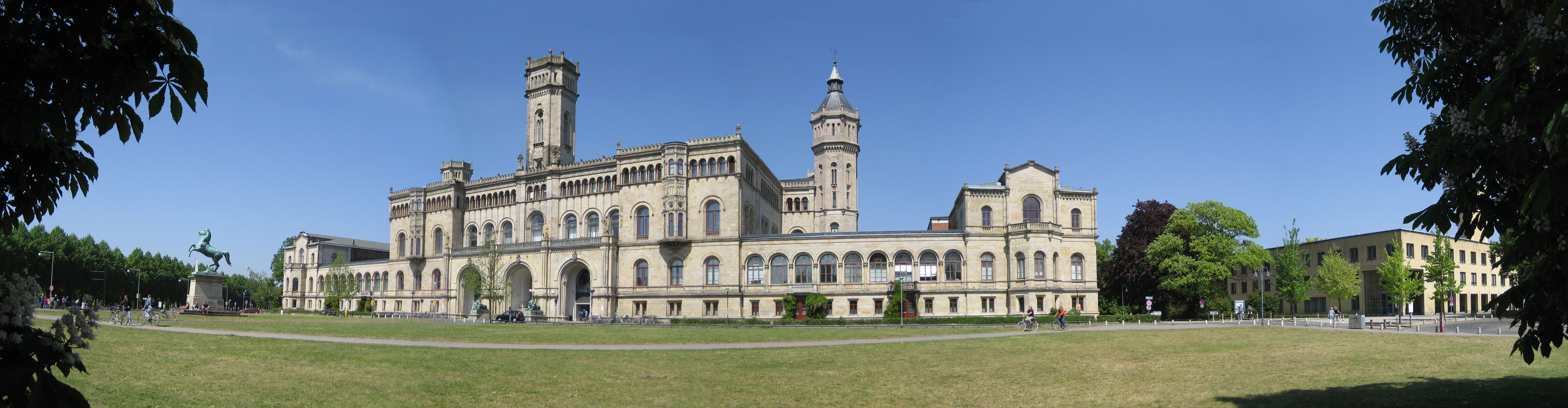
Leibniz University Hannover (main building). On the right the International Office: a facility to contact for advice and guidance connected with international matters

== See also ==
- Welfenschloss Stables
- German National Library of Science and Technology
- List of universities in Germany
- List of colleges and universities
