= Roger McNeice =

Australian numismatist

Roger Vere McNeice OAM FRNS CF is an Australian numismatist, historian, author and coin collector. He is also a token and medal designer.

McNeice was awarded a Churchill Fellowship in 1984 "to study developments in the conservation and preservation of coins and medals." He was awarded a National Medal in 1984, and a Medal of the Order of Australia in 1996.

McNeice founded the Tasmanian Numismatic Society and has served as the Honorary Curator of Numismatics at the Tasmanian Museum and Art Gallery.

McNeice also collects Winston Churchill memorabilia, and featured in an episode of the TV series Collectors.

He is the author of several books relating to Tasmania's fire fighting history and Tasmanian and Australian coins and banknotes.

He currently lives in Tasmania with his wife Jill and has three children.
