= Luise Drüke =

German international relations expert

Dr. Luise Druke
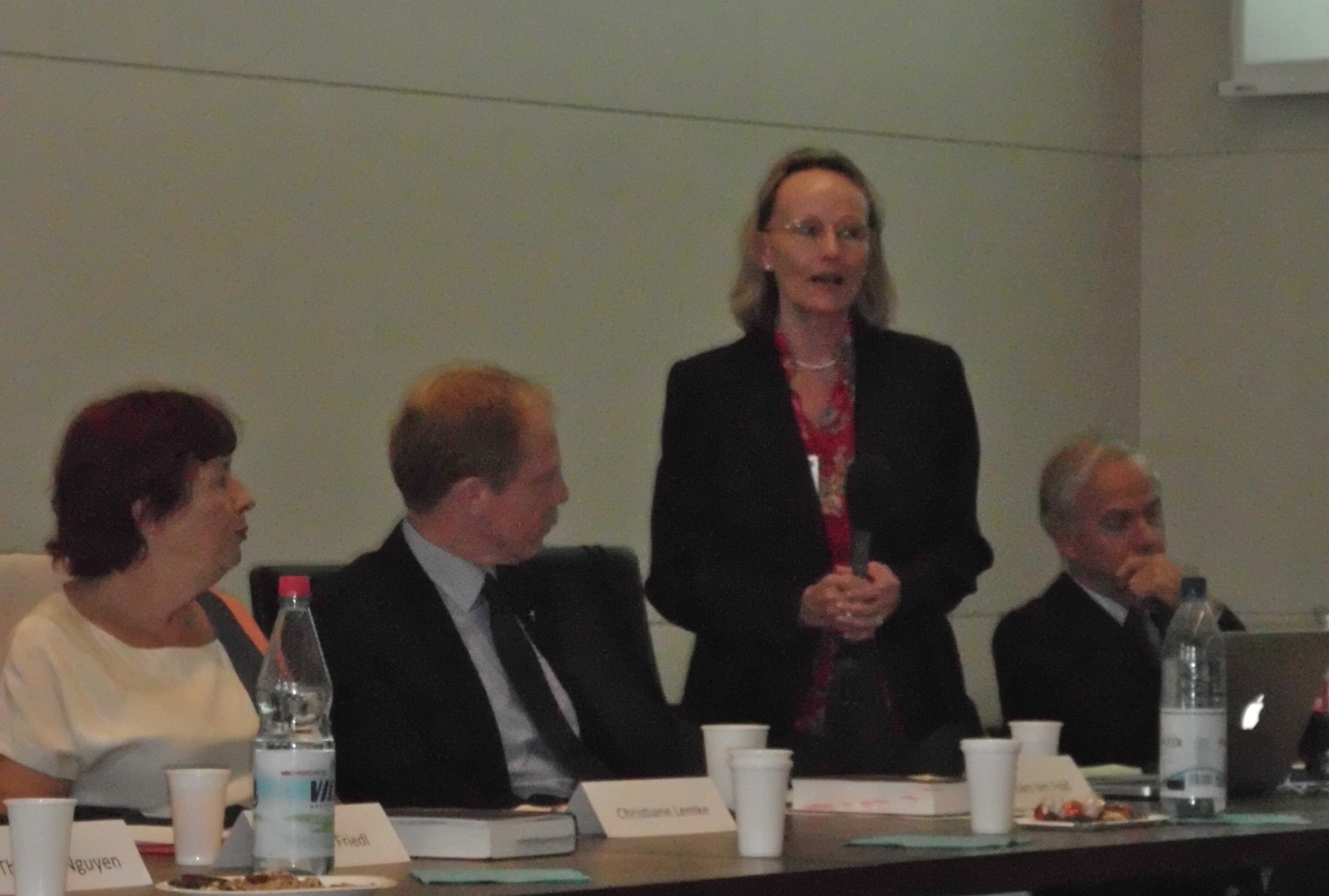
- Luise Druke: Innovations in refugee protection, Frankfurt am Main, 2013
- Born: 1948 (age 77–78)
- Education: University of Hannover (Master of Arts)
- Known for: Innovations in Refugee Protection, A Compendium of UNHCR's 60 Years.
- Awards: Nobel Peace Prize Certificate in recognition of devoted refugee service with UNHCR, 1981
- Scientific career
- Fields: Political Science, International Relations & Law, United Nations
- Workplaces: Harvard University
- Doctoral advisor: Jürgen Seifert, David Kennedy (jurist)
- Other academic advisors: John Thomas

Luise Druke, DPhil, MPA (born May 17, 1948) is a German scholar and practitioner in the fields of International Relations, United Nations, and Refugee protection. Besides her academic work, Dr. Druke has headed offices and missions of the UNHCR (High Commissioner for Refugees) in Europe, South East Asia and Central Asia, Latin America, and Africa for nearly 30 years.

== Biography ==
Dr. Luise Druke was born in Hannover on May 17, 1948. She received a DPhil in political science from the University of Hannover while Fellow at Harvard's Center for International Affairs and Visiting Researcher at the Harvard Law School Human Rights Program (1987–88). She also received an honorary doctorate in political science and law from Shumen University, and one in international affairs in 2023 from the John Cabot University a Master in Public Administration (MPA) from Harvard University, an LL.M. from Brussels University and a M.A. in economics, Finance and Management from Webster University, St. Louis, a diploma from Sorbonne, License d'enseignement from Paris VIII University and a M.A. from the European Institute of High International Studies, University of Nice in European Studies.

Since 1977, Dr. Druke has headed offices and missions of the UNHCR (United Nations High Commissioner for Refugees) in Europe, South East Asia and Central Asia, Latin America, and Africa, including the Namibian Operation as part of UNTAG, the country operation in Honduras with refugees from El Salvador, Nicaragua and Guatemala in the midst of armed conflicts during the late 1980s, and the operations in Kazakhstan/Central Asia. While UNHCR representative in Bulgaria she frequently acted as the UN Resident Coordinator from 2000 to 2005, as well as the Humanitarian Coordinator in the NATO Cooperative Key operations (2001, 2003, and initially in 2005) with 20,000 refugees in the midst of an air conflict between warring parties inside of Bulgaria. During and after her work for the United Nations Dr. Druke lectured at the Faculty of Law and the European Institute and the University of Nice, at Boston University in the graduate program in International Relations in Brussels and presented seminars and round tables at the Harvard Kennedy School as well as at the MIT Center for International Studies where she served as a visiting scholar. She also has been teaching semester courses at the Leibniz University Hannover, at Suffolk University and at Harvard University in UN and EU related topics.

== Publications ==
Dr. Luise Druke is author/co-editor of 13 books and over 30 articles, including:

- Innovations in refugee protection; including case studies on IT communities, Vietnamese boatpeople, Chilean exile and Namibian repatriation (Peter Lang, 2013) (in English)
- Refugee Protection and Integration in Bulgaria (UNHCR Sofia, 2004–2005) (in English and Bulgarian)
- Collection of Documents on Refugees and Persons in Refugee Like Situations in the Republic of Kazakhstan (UNHCR Almaty, 1998) (in English, Russian, and Kazakh)
- O Novo Regime Juridico de Asilo em Portugal, Recohla de Trabalhos do ACNUR em Portugal (UNHCR Lisboa, 1995–1997) (in Portuguese)
- Colectanea de Estudos e Documentacao sobre Refugiados. Vol. II, eds. Druke/Galvao (UNHCR Lisboa, 1997) (in Portuguese)
- Audição Parlamentar sobre a situação dos Refugiados em Portugal, eds. Druke/Martins (UNHCR Lisboa/Assembly of the Republic Portugal, 1996) (in Portuguese)
- Colectanea de Estudos e Documentacao sobre Refugiados. Vol. I, eds. Druke/Galvao (UNHCR Lisboa, 1996) (in Portuguese)
- Fluchtziel Europa – Strategien fur eine neue Fluchtlingspolitik. eds. Druke/Weigelt (Olzog, 1993) (in German)
- Asylum Rules in the European Union – Legislative Instruments and Judicial Control (Institute of Public Intl. Law & Intl. Relations of Thessaloniki, 1994/2000 pp. 265–374) (in English)
- Refugee Policy to 1992 and Beyond. Proposals for a New Humanitarian Order at the European and Intl. Level (UNHCR Brussels, 1991) (in English)
- Preventive Action for Refugee Producing Situations. With a foreword of Poul Hartling, Diss. (Peter Lang, 1990, 2nd ed. 1993). (in English)

== Honors and academic awards ==
- Nobel Peace Prize Certificate in recognition of devoted refugee service with UNHCR, 1981
- UNHCR Gold pin in recognition of 25 years of distinguished refugee service, 2002
- Outstanding Club Contribution Award by the Harvard Alumni Association's Club Committee for outstanding service as Regional Director Europe
- Fellow at Harvard Humanitarian Initiative, Harvard University, since 2011
- Visiting Scholar at Harvard Law School Institut of Global Law and Policy, Harvard University, 2011–2012
- Member/Study Group Leader at Harvard Department of Continuous Education (HILR), Harvard University, since 2008
- Visiting Scholar Center for International Studies, Massachusetts Institute of Technology, 2006
- Fellow Program on Human Rights & Justice, Massachusetts Institute of Technology, 2004–2006
- Doctor of Laws and Politology (honoris causa) from Shumen University ‘Episkop Konstantin Preslavski’, Bulgaria, 2002
- Research Scholar Graduate Institute of International Studies (HEI), UNHCR sponsored, Department of Intl. Protection, Spring 2000
- Associate Center for International Affairs, Harvard University, 1999–2000
- Associate Center for International Affairs, Harvard University, 1988–1988
- Visiting Researcher Harvard Law School, Dissertation: Preventive Action for Refugee Producing Situation, 1987–1988
- Fellow Center for International Affairs (CFIA) Harvard University, 1987–1988
