= Charles Farthing =

New Zealand doctor

- Born: 23 April 1953; Christchurch, New Zealand
- Died: 6 April 2014 (aged 60); Hong Kong, China
- Occupation: Physician
- Partner: Dougie Lui

Charles Frank Farthing CF (22 April 1953 – 6 April 2014) was a New Zealand doctor who specialised in the treatment of AIDS. He was the medical director of the AIDS Healthcare Foundation from 2001 to 2007. He later worked at Merck Sharp & Dohme as the director of medical affairs for infectious diseases in the Asia-Pacific.

== Early life ==
Farthing was born on 22 April 1953 in Christchurch, New Zealand. His father was an accountant and his mother was a music teacher. He was educated at Christ's College, Christchurch, an independent boys school. As a child he had considered entering the priesthood. He went on to study medicine at the University of Otago in Dunedin.

== Medical career ==
Farthing began his medical career in New Zealand where he practiced as a dermatologist. After five years, he moved abroad and worked for a year in Riyadh, Saudi Arabia. He then moved to England and joined St. Stephen's Hospital, London in Chelsea. Between 1985 and 1987, the numbers of AIDS patients treated at St Stephen's rose from a dozen to over 1000. From 1985 to 1988, he was involved in clinical trials for the antiretroviral drugs Thymosin, AZT and foscarnet. In 1987, he helped found the Kobler Center at St Stephen's Hospital which specialised in the treatment and research of HIV/AIDS. It was one of the first wards in the United Kingdom to specialise in the area. He was chair of the all-party parliamentary committee on AIDS during the late 1980s, and was instrumental in guiding the governments reaction to the AIDS crisis.

In 1988, he was awarded a Churchill fellowship which allowed him to move to the United States of America where he studied AIDS at the Bellevue Hospital in New York. He later became the director of the hospital's AIDS treatment program. In 1994, he moved to Los Angeles where he became the principal investigator of the AIDS Healthcare Foundation, and in 2001, he was promoted to medical director. In 2007, he left the United States for Hong Kong where he joined Merck Sharp & Dohme. At the time of his death, he was director of medical affairs for infectious diseases in the Asia-Pacific.

== Death ==
Farthing died on 6 April 2014 of a heart attack while travelling in a taxi in Hong Kong. His funeral was held at Church of St Michael and All Angels, an Anglican church in Christchurch on 22 April 2014. He is buried on Banks Peninsula.

== Personal life ==
Farthing was gay. At the time of his death he was in a relationship with Dougie Lui, a hotelier. He had owned a number of cats but did not have any children.
