= Welfenschloss =

Former royal palace in Hannover and main building of the Leibniz University Hanover

Coordinates: 52.3826°N 9.7178°E

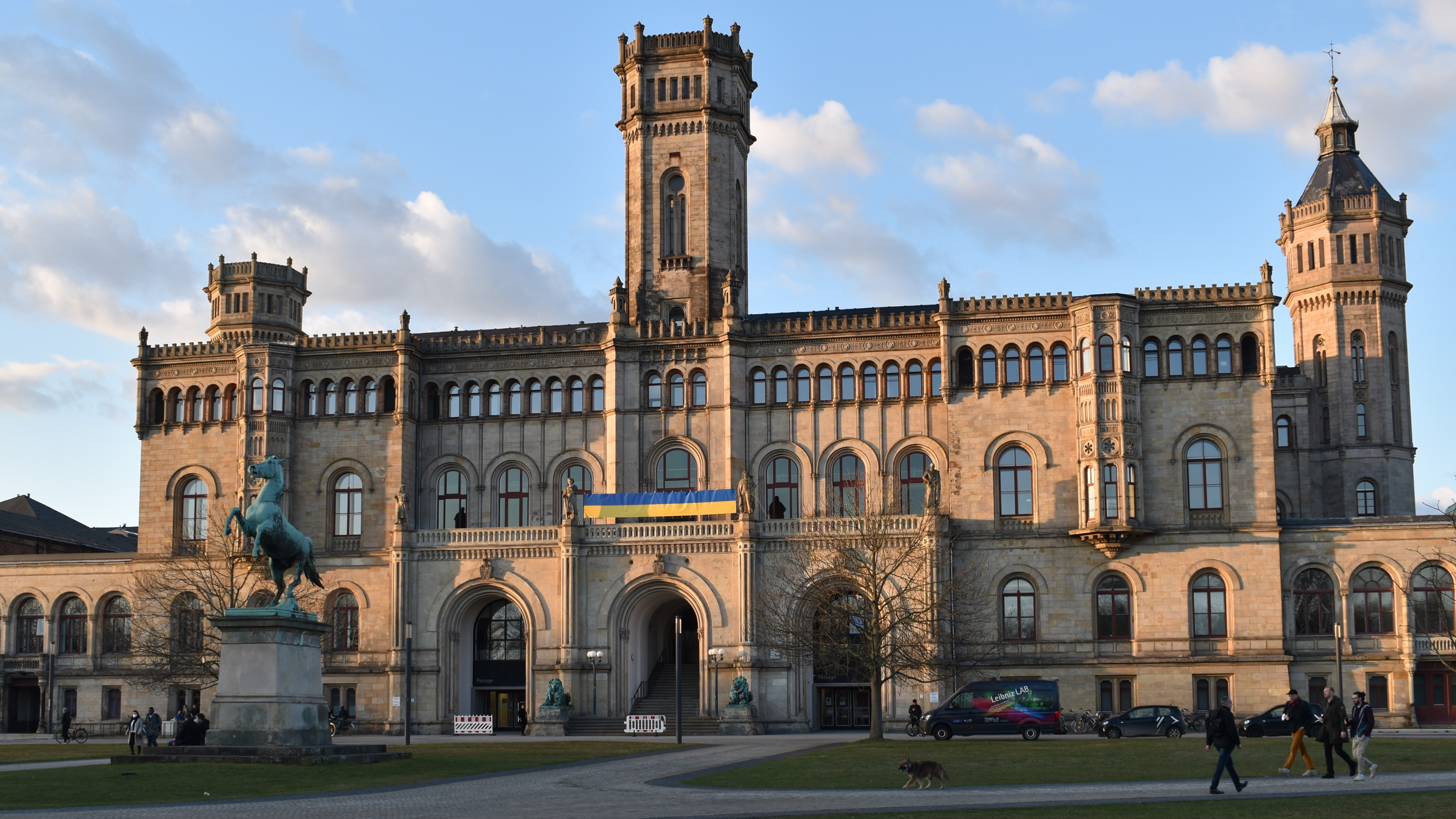
The Guelph palace (Welfenschloss) in Hanover

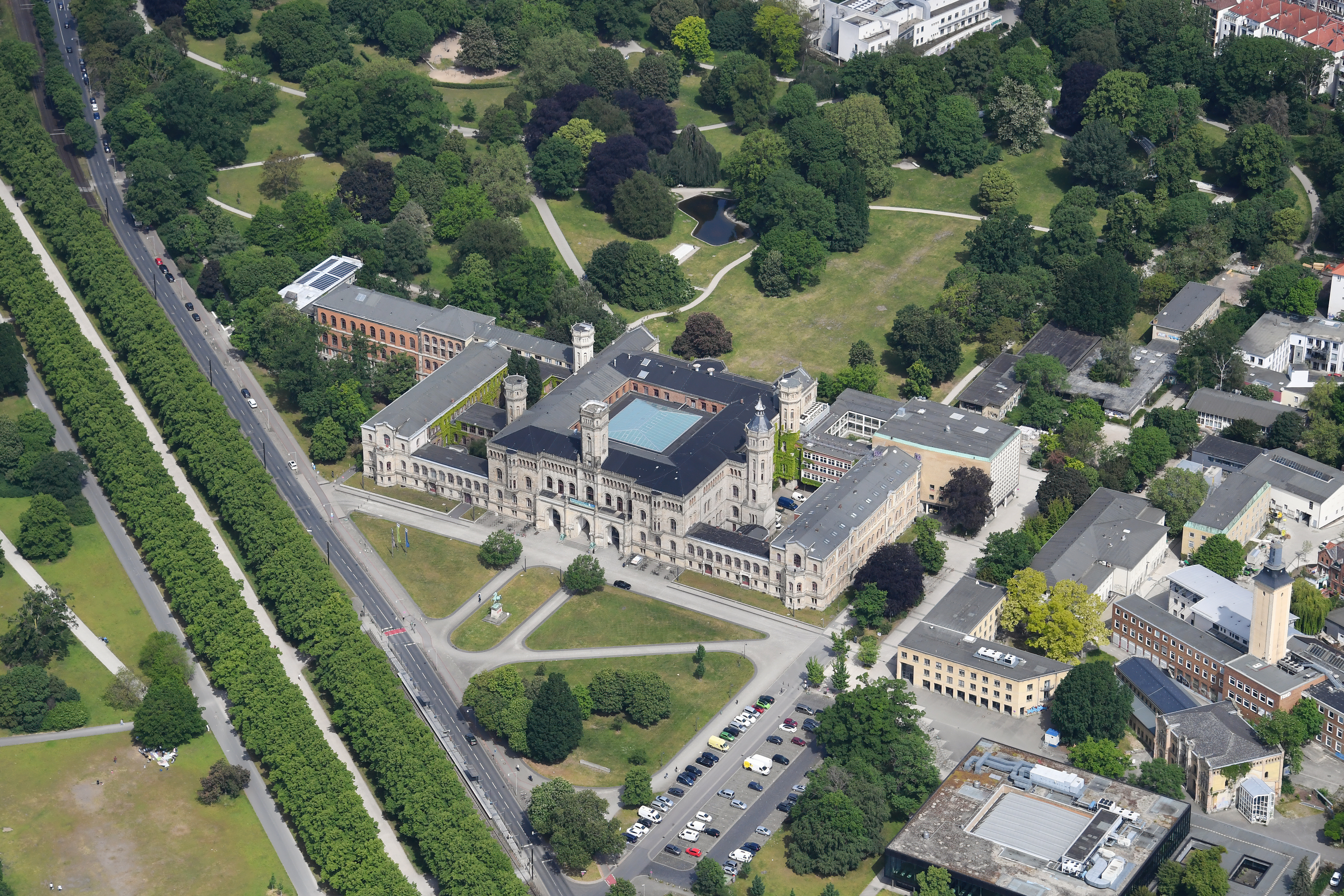
The palace with its surrounding garden from the air

The Welfenschloss (lit. 'Guelph palace') is a former royal palace in Hanover, Germany, which serves as the main building of the Leibniz University Hannover. The university is housed in the palace since 1879. The palace is surrounded by a large English landscape garden, named the Welfengarten (lit. 'Guelph garden').

== History ==
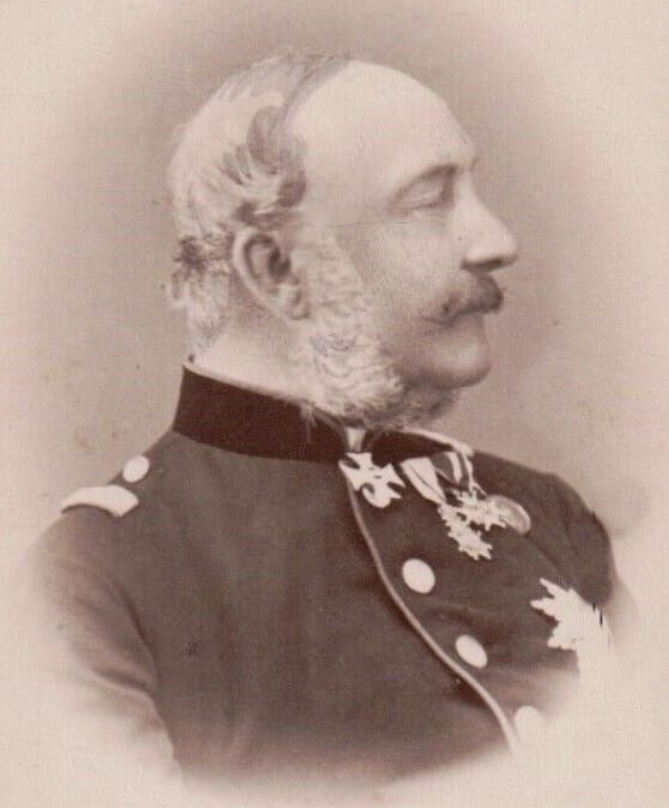
King George V

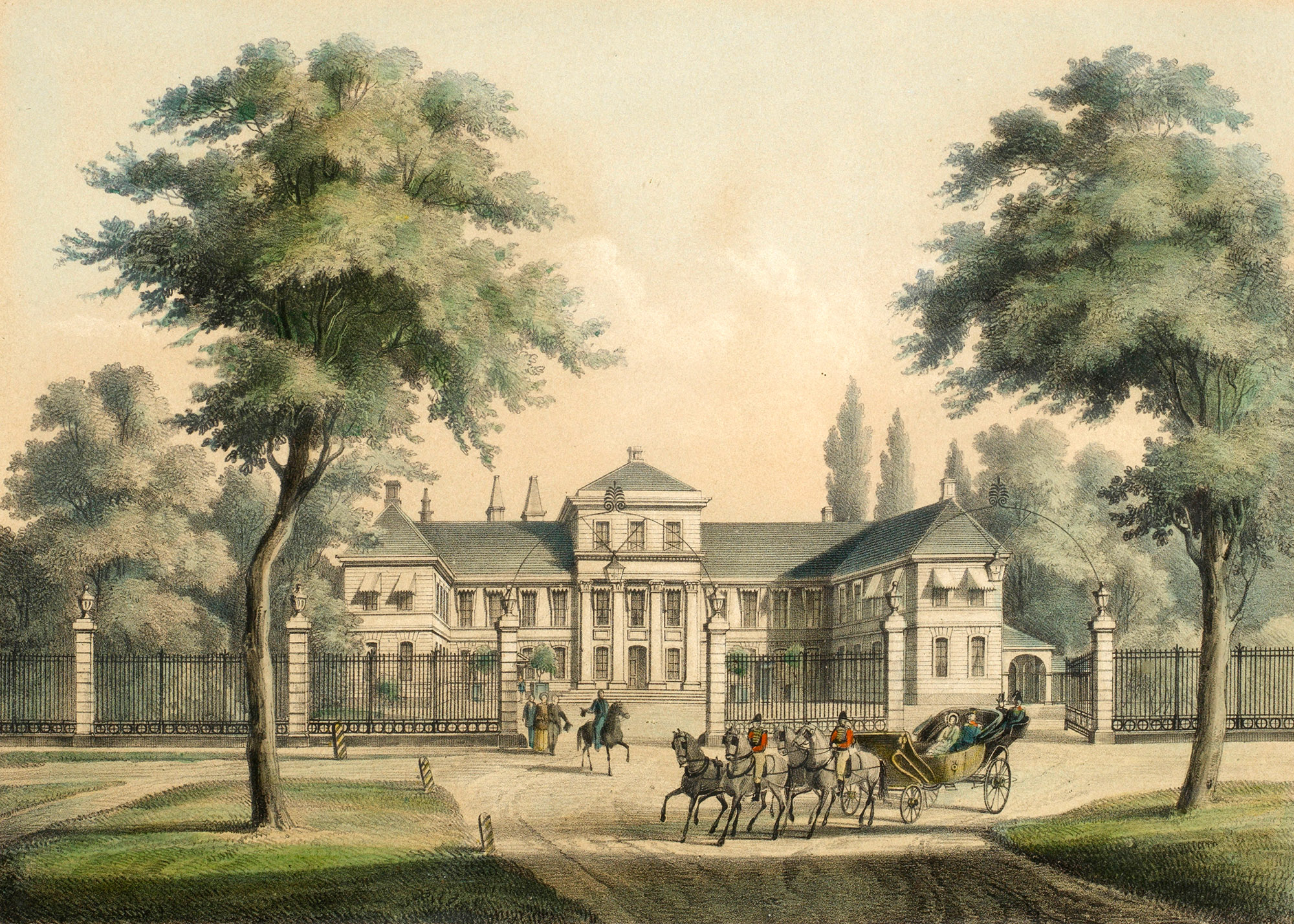
Schloss Monbrillant in 1850, which previously occupied the site

=== New royal residence ===
In 1856, king George V of Hanover (1819–1878) decided to build a new royal residence. Initially, only as a summer residence, but later intended as the main seat replacing the Leineschloss in the city centre. The king engaged the architect Christian Heinrich Tramm (1819–1861) to make the designs in neo-Gothic style. When Tramm died, he was replaced by the construction manager of the project, Eduard Heidelberg.

The site of the palace of previously occupied by another palace, Schloss Monbrilliant. This palace dated from the first half of the 18th century, and served as a summer residence of kings Ernest Augustus (1771–1851) and George V. Before construction of the new palace commenced, the old palace was demolished, and rebuilt in Georgsmarienhütte before finally being torn down in 1923.

Construction of the new palace started in 1857. Workers used yellowish-white sandstone from the Danndorf and Velpke areas near Helmstedt, one of the hardest sandstones in Germany, and sandstone from Nesselberg near Nesselberg.

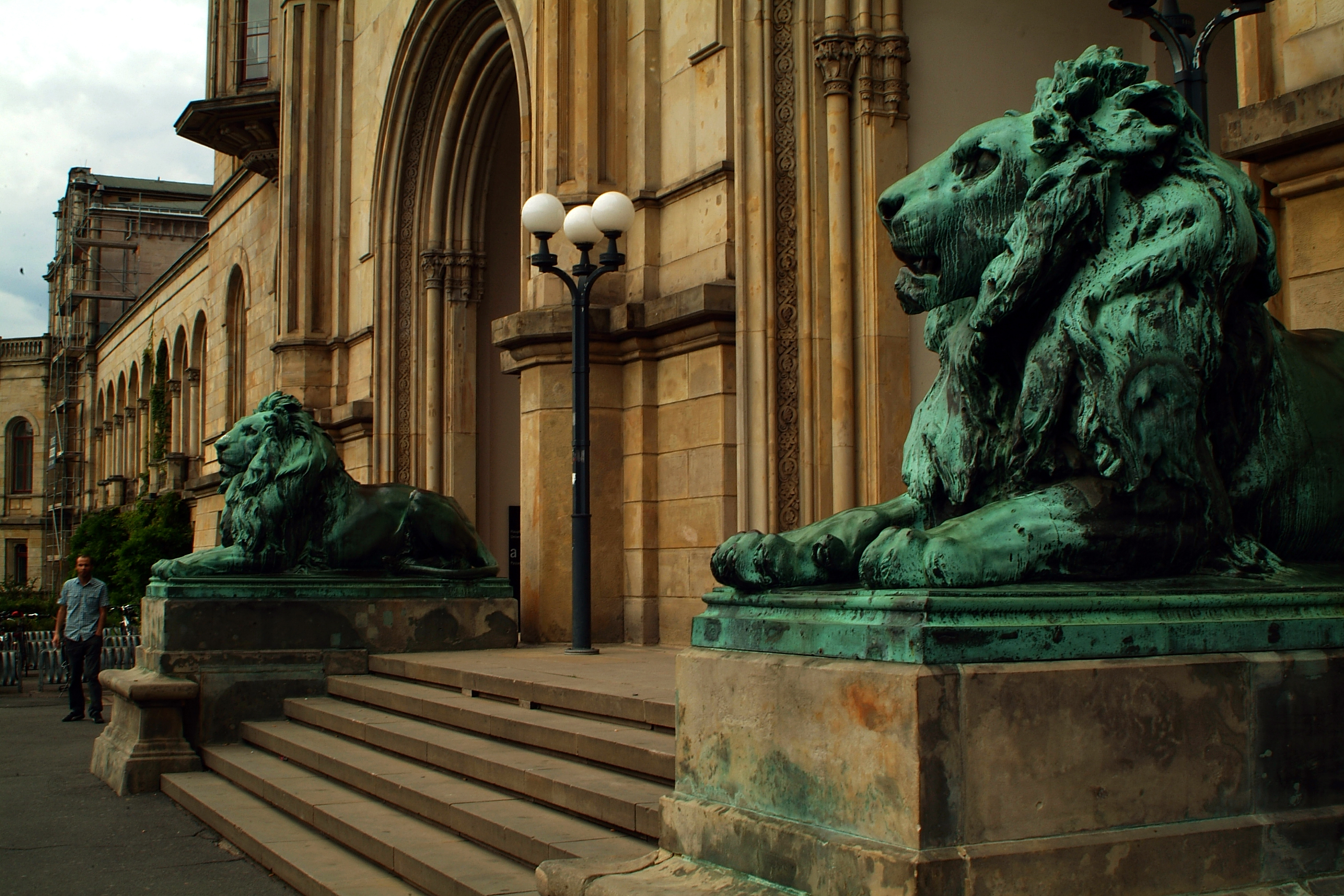
The bronze lions guarding the entrance

The palace was initially named Schloss Königsitz, but in 1861 this was changed into Welfenschloss after the reigning dynasty, the House of Welf, of which the House of Hanover was the surviving branch. This also determined the iconography of the palace. On the side of the garden, the Welfengarten, the exterior is decorated with sculptures of eight significant Welf rulers. Around 1862 the sculptor Wilhelm Engelhard created the most important one, that of Henry the Lion (1129/1131-1195). On the entrance side, Adolf Rosenthal created the bronze Lions.

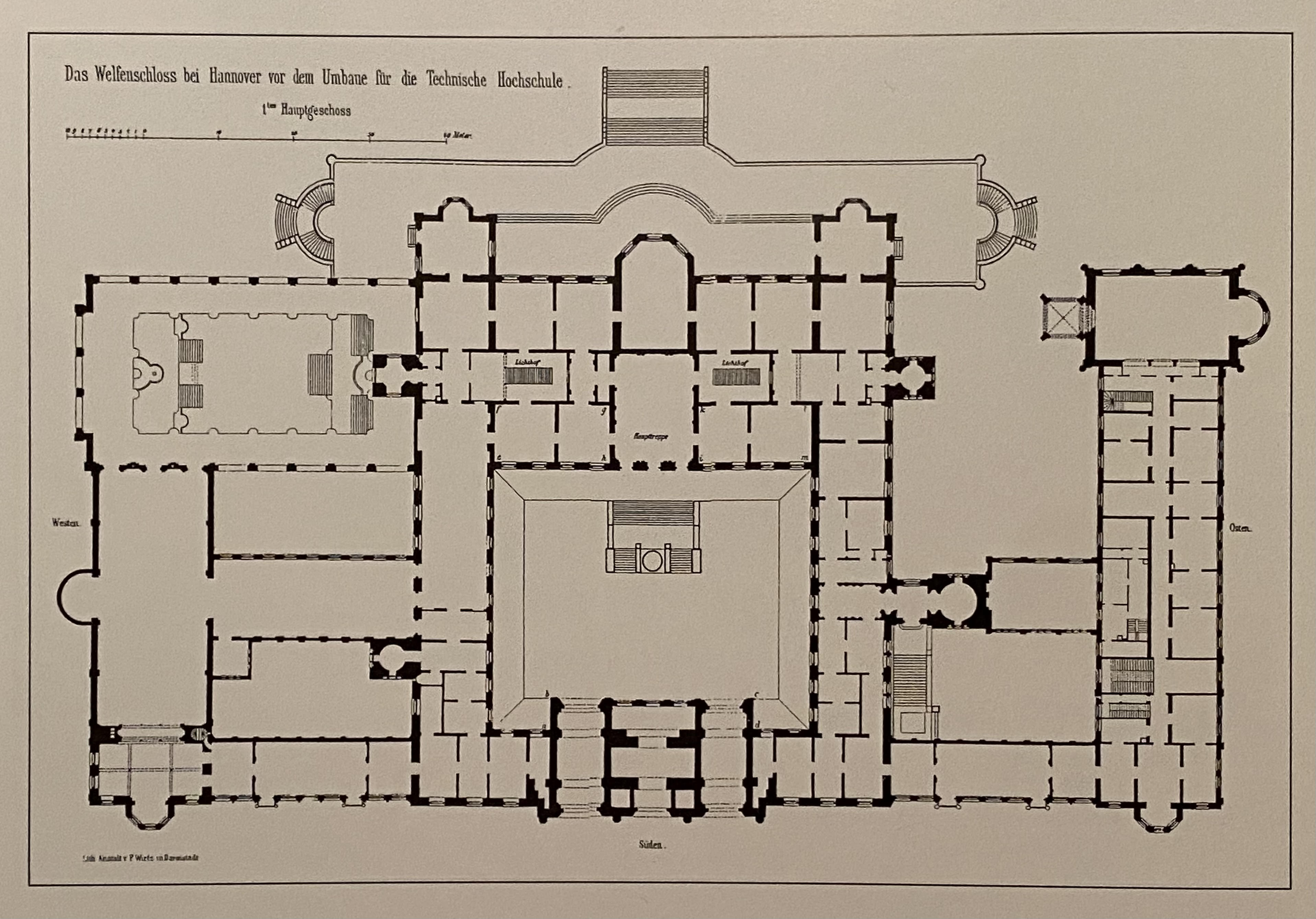
Plan of the first floor before the rebuilding to university

George V's reign ended as a result of the Austro-Prussian War in 1866 after the battle of Langensalza and Prussia annexing Hanover. Construction works ended, leaving the palace empty for over a decade. While the Welfenschloss was built, George V also constructed another neo-gothic castle, Marienburg castle, between 1858 and 1867, which he presented to his wife Marie of Saxe-Altenburg as a birthday present.

=== Leibniz University Hannover ===
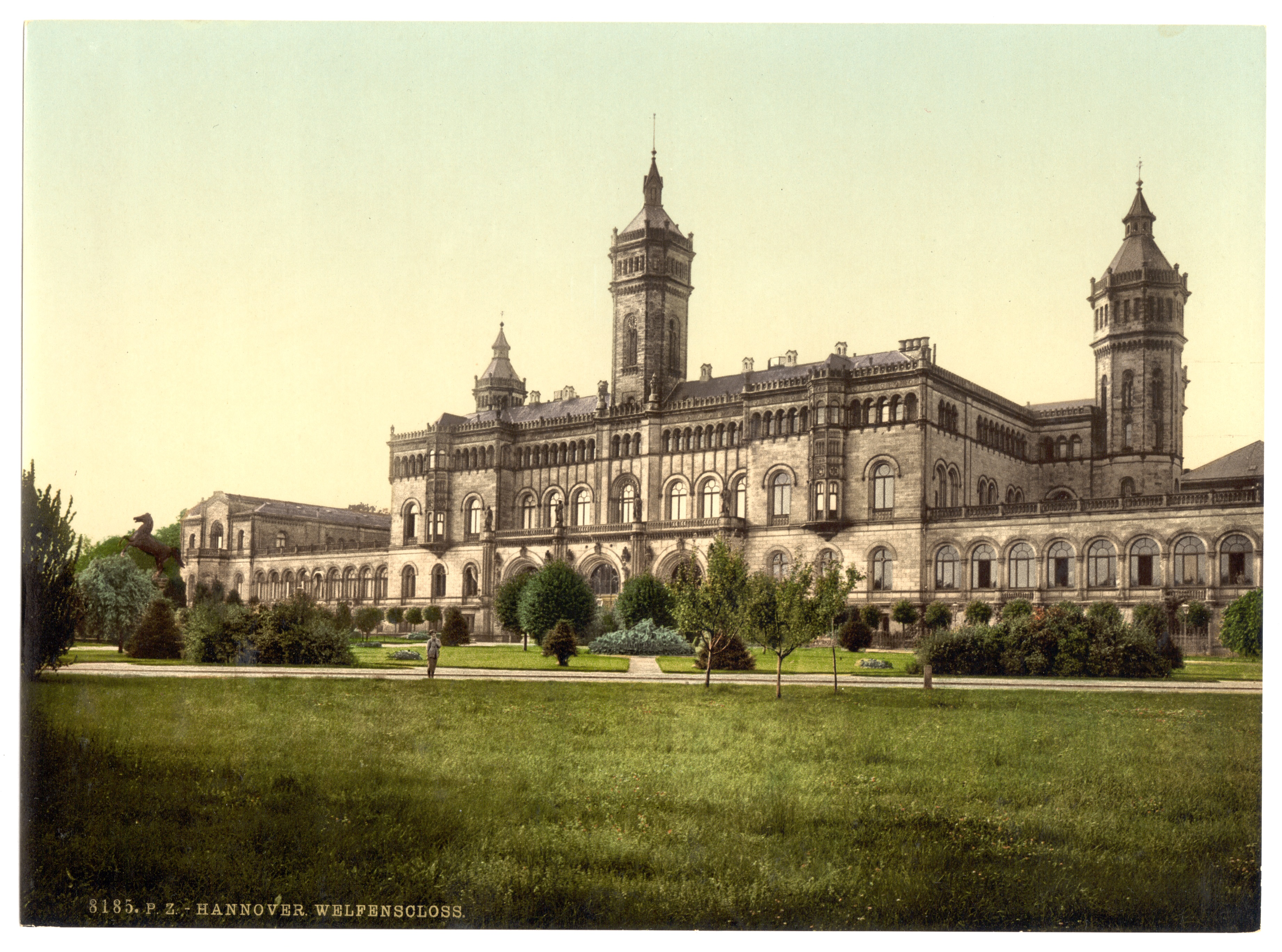
The palace around 1895

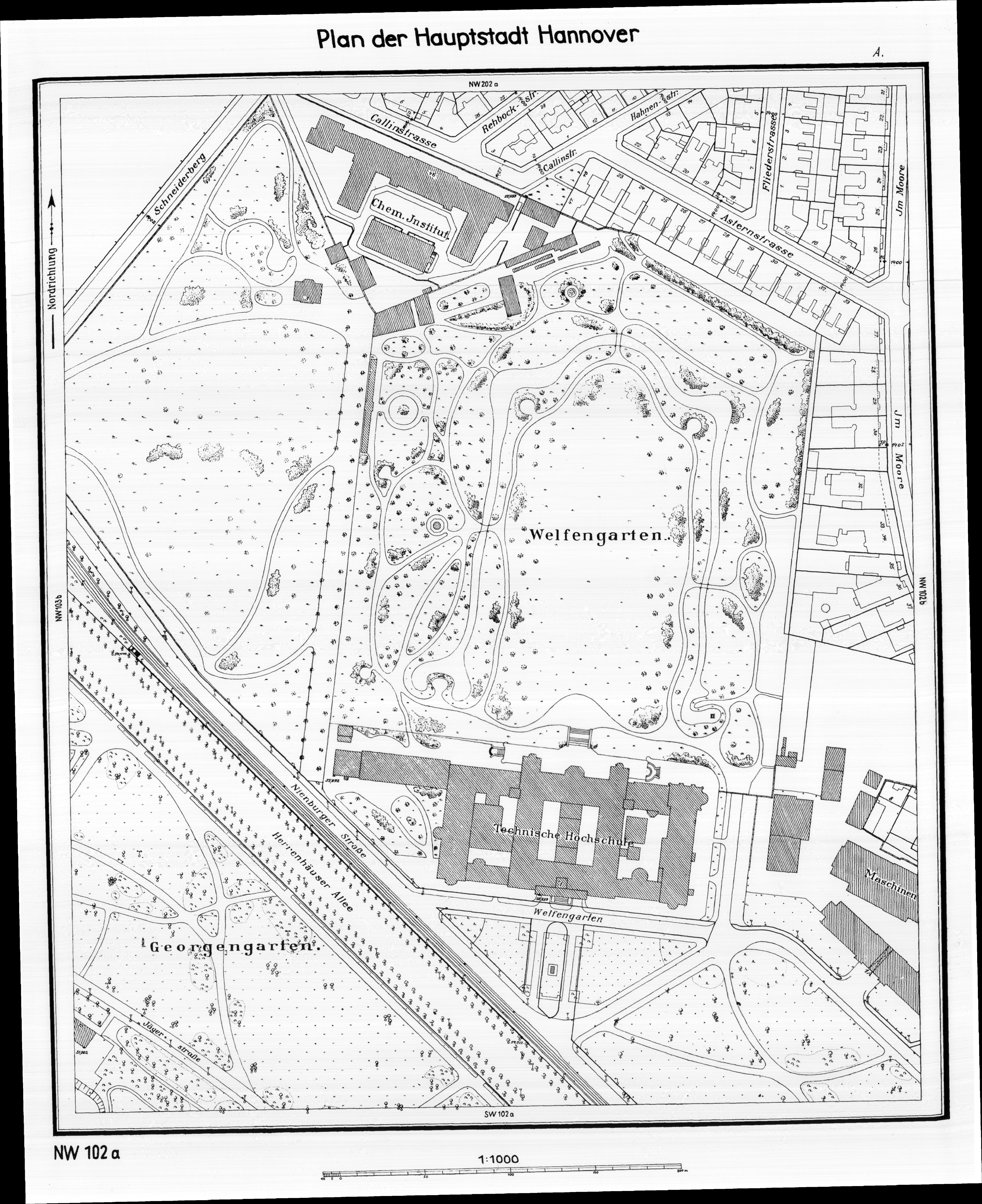
Map of the palace and its surrounding garden in 1918

It was not until 1879 that a new purpose was found for the palace with the Higher Vocational School (as of 2006 the Leibniz University Hannover) moving into the palace. Extensive renovations works were performed by Hermann Hunaeus to transform the palace into an educational building. In 1899, emperor Wilhelm II elevated the school to the status of a university.

During the Allied aerial raids on Hanover, the chapel on the east side of the palace was heavily damaged. In 1955, it was demolished. On its location, an extension was erected between 1956 and 1958 to house an auditorium and a lecture hall.

== Saxon Steed ==
A bronze statue of a Saxon Steed (Sachsenross) created in 1866 is situated in front of the palace. It is a duplicate from a sculpture made by Albert Wolf for the entrance of the Altes Museum in Berlin, the Löwenkämpfer. The Saxon Steed is a heraldic motif associated with the German provinces of Lower Saxony and Westphalia, and the Dutch region of Twente.

== Panorama ==
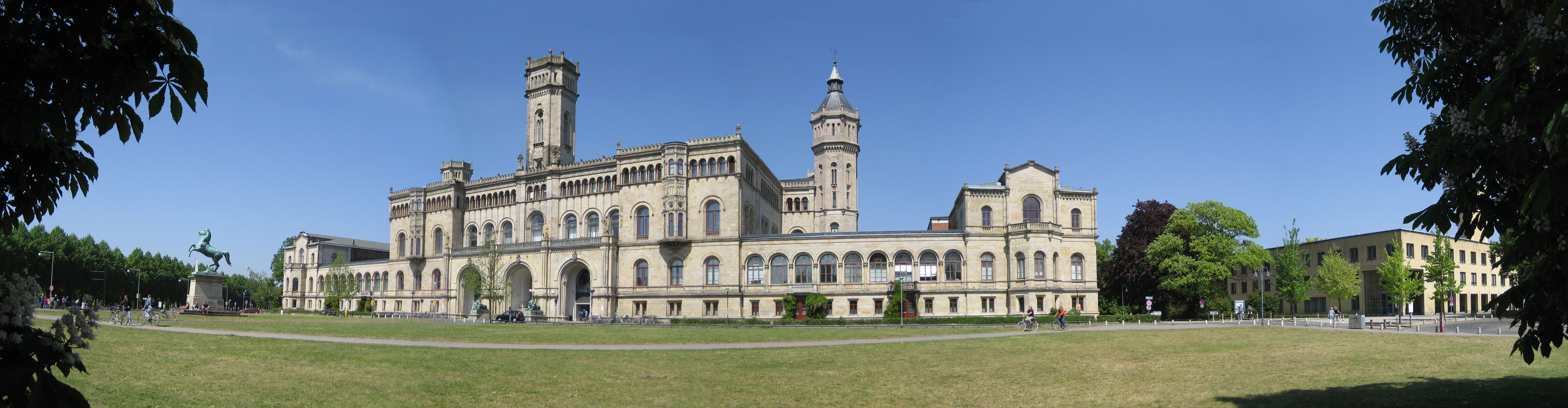
The palace today as the main building of the university

== Literature ==
- Weiß, Gerd (1983). "Ehemaliges Welfenschloss". Denkmaltopographie Bundesrepublik Deutschland, Baudenkmale in Niedersachsen, Stadt Hannover, Teil 1 (in German). Braunschweig. p. 101. ISBN 3-528-06203-7.
- Auffarth, Sid; Pietsch, Wolfgang, eds. (2003). Die Universität Hannover. Ihre Bauten, ihre Gärten, ihre Planungsgeschichte (in German). Petersberg: Imhof Verlag. ISBN 3-935590-90-3.
- Lindau, Friedrich (2003). "Das Welfenschloss (Schloss Königsitz)". Hannover Der höfische Bereich Herrenhausen Vom Ungang der Stadt mit den Baudenkmalen ihrer feudalen Epoche (in German). München, Berlin: Deutscher Kunstverlag. pp. 72–82. ISBN 3-422-06424-9.
- Knocke, Helmut (2009). "Welfenschloss". In Mlynek, Klaus; Röhrbein, Waldemar R. (eds.). Stadtlexikon Hannover. Von den Anfängen bis in die Gegenwart (in German). Hanover: Schlütersche. p. 668. ISBN 978-3-89993-662-9.

== See also: other Hanoverian royal residences ==
- Herrenhausen Gardens
- Leineschloss
- Marienburg Castle
- Welfenschloss Stables
- Cumberland Castle
