= Shan Raffel =

Australian firefighter

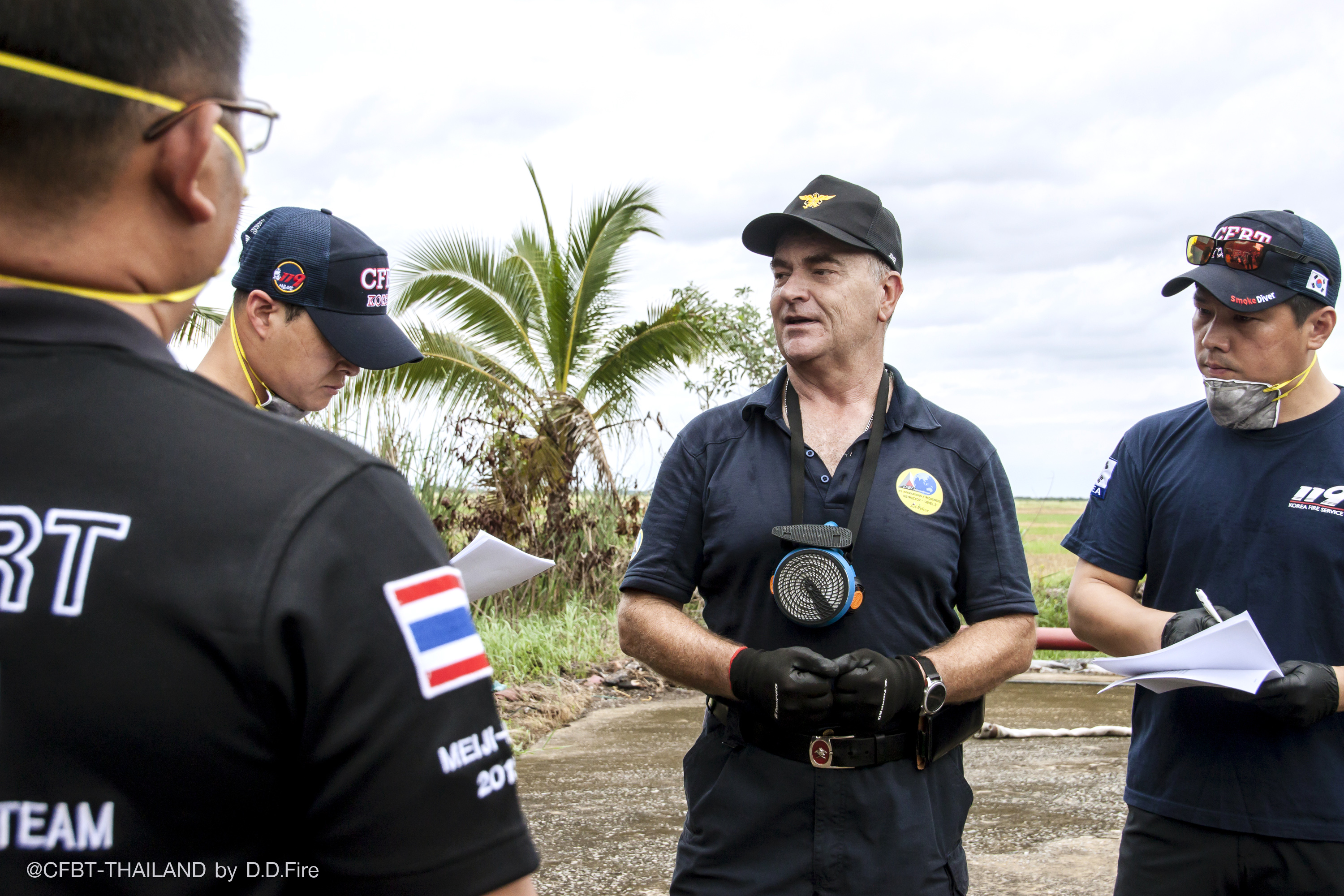
2019 CFBT-I Instructor and Tactical Ventilation Instructor International Course

Shan Raffel CF is an Australian firefighter serving as an operational station officer in Brisbane. After the death of two colleagues in 1994 and the serious injury of two others in 1996, he submitted a proposal for an intensive international study of compartment fire behavior training (CFBT). Raffel visited the United Kingdom and Sweden for 6 weeks to study the most advanced teaching tactics and training facilities. Upon return, he shaped the first nationally recognized training program in Australia and has since assisted numerous fire services in Australia and internationally with the development of their training facilities and teaching materials.

In 2009, Raffel was awarded a Churchill Fellowship to research “Planning Preparation and Response to Emergencies in Tunnels”. He is focused on exploring ways of improving efficiency and safety as to firefighting. During 30-year career in the fire service, he has conducted international study tours in the USA (FDNY), Canada, Germany, Austria, Scandinavia and Switzerland.

He is teaching his knowledge and experience as a CFBT and Fire Behavior instructor in various countries including South Korea, Croatia, Thailand, Belgium.

== Books ==
Compartment Firefighting Series by Ben Walker with Shan Raffel

- Fire Dynamics for Firefighters (Pavilion Media, 2016), ISBN 9781911028321
- Reading Fire (Pavilion Media, 2017), ISBN 9781911028734
- Fighting Fire (Pavilion Media, 2017) ISBN 9781911028741

Other books

- 3D Fire Fighting: Training, Techniques, and Tactics by Paul Grimwood, Ed Hartin, John McDonough and Shan Raffel (Fire Protection Publications, 2005) ISBN 978-0-87939-258-1
