= Markus Raffel =

German aerospace engineer and academic (born 1962)

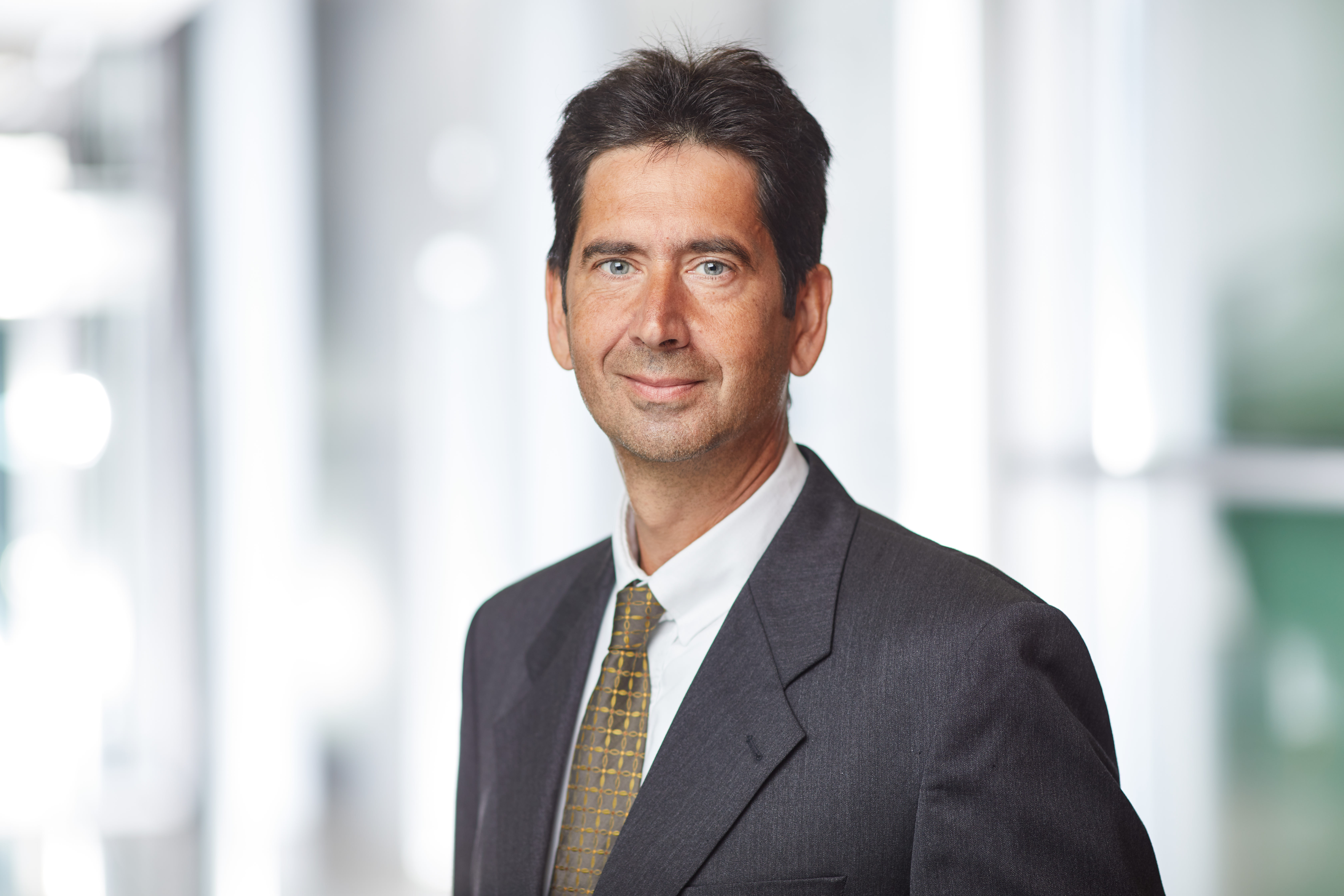
- Markus Raffel in 2017
- Born: 1962 (age 63–64); Göttingen, West Germany
- Education: Leibniz University Hannover (Dr.-Ing.), Clausthal University of Technology (Dr.-Ing. habil.)
- Occupations: mechanical engineer and professor of aerodynamics
- Known for: experimental fluid mechanics, flights in authentic replicas of Otto Lilienthal gliders
- Awards: Helmholtz Prize (1996), Howard Hughes Award (2004), Otto Lilienthal Research Award (2017), Leonardo da Vinci Award (2023)

Markus Raffel (born 1962) is a German aerospace engineer and professor of aerodynamics at Leibniz University Hannover. He is also the head of the Helicopters Department at the German Aerospace Center (DLR) in Göttingen, where he conducts research in flow visualization, rotorcraft aerodynamics, and experimental fluid mechanics.

== Life and career ==
Raffel studied mechanical engineering at the Clausthal University of Technology and at the Karlsruhe Institute of Technology until 1990. He received his doctoral degree (Dr.-Ing.) in engineering from the Leibniz University Hannover in 1993, and completed his habilitation in fluid mechanics at Clausthal University in 2001.

Raffel has worked at the German Aerospace Center (DLR) since 1991, primarily at the Institute of Aerodynamics and Flow Technology in Göttingen. He serves as head of the Helicopters Department at the same institute. Since 2007, he has been a full professor of aerodynamics at Leibniz University Hannover, a position jointly held with DLR.

Raffel has collaborated with national and international institutions on various research initiatives related to rotorcraft aerodynamics, transonic wind tunnel testing, and optical flow measurement technologies. He is lead author of a number of books, including the widely distributed 2018 textbook Particle Image Velocimetry: A Practical Guide and the 2022 The Flying Man: Otto Lilienthal—History, Flights and Photographs.

== Research and work ==
Raffel works in flow diagnostics, including particle image velocimetry (PIV), background-oriented schlieren (BOS), and differential infrared thermography (DIT). As part of the DLR and together with NASA, he researched ways to reduce helicopter noise.

Raffel has led research programs exploring the aerodynamics and flight characteristics of historical Otto Lilienthal glider replicas. He and his team successfully constructed replicas of flight pioneer Otto Lilienthal's 1890s gliders standard soaring apparatus (Normalsegelapparat), his large bi-plane (Großer Doppeldecker), and his experimental monoplane (Experimentiergerät). Since 2018 and together with the Otto Lilienthal Museum in Anklam, Raffel himself has conducted several flights with the gliders. The goal was to confirm the flight performance and potential static stability of Lilienthal's gliders, the efficacy of Otto Lilienthal's control surfaces and the wing warping mechanism.

During his employment at DLR, Raffel worked on a number of topics during research stays at international research establishments and contributed to the advancement of optical flow measurement techniques. At the California Institute of Technology (Caltech), he collaborated on dual-plane PIV, enabling three-dimensional analysis of turbulent flows. He worked on background-oriented schlieren methods (BOS) for large-scale visualization of complex flow fields at ETH Zurich. At the Aix-Marseille University, he investigated micro-PIV techniques to study flows at the microscale. His experimental work also extended to flight testing Otto Lilienthal's gliders at Caltech, combining historical flight reconstruction with aerodynamic analysis. Further collaborations at the University of Alberta focused on PIV wind tunnel seeding strategies, while subsequent work at NASA Ames included stereoscopic PIV recordings of helicopter rotor wakes in large-scale facilities.

According to Google Scholar, Raffel has authored or co-authored over 400 publications, with more than 17,000 citations including 16 patents as of 2025.

== Honors and recognition (selection) ==
- 1996: Helmholtz Prize for work on measurement techniques
- 1998: DLR Science Award
- 2004: Howard Hughes Award from the American Helicopter Society
- 2005: Post Rouge of the French National Center for Scientific Research
- 2017: Otto Lilienthal Research Award from DLR
- 2023: Leonardo da Vinci Award from the International Society on Flow Visualization
- 2024: Lilienthal Prize by the town of Anklam
- 2024: STAB-Prize for research and development in the field of fluid mechanics

Raffel was named an Associate Fellow of the American Institute of Aeronautics and Astronautics (AIAA) in 2025.

== Selected works ==
- Raffel, M., Willert, C., Wereley, S., & Kompenhans, J., Scarano F., Kähler C. J. (3rd edition 2018). Particle Image Velocimetry: A Practical Guide. Springer. ISBN 9783319688510
- Raffel, M., Lukasch, B. (2022): The Flying Man: Otto Lilienthal—History, Flights and Photographs. Springer. ISBN 9783030950323
