= Christian Heinrich Tramm =

German architect (1819–1861)

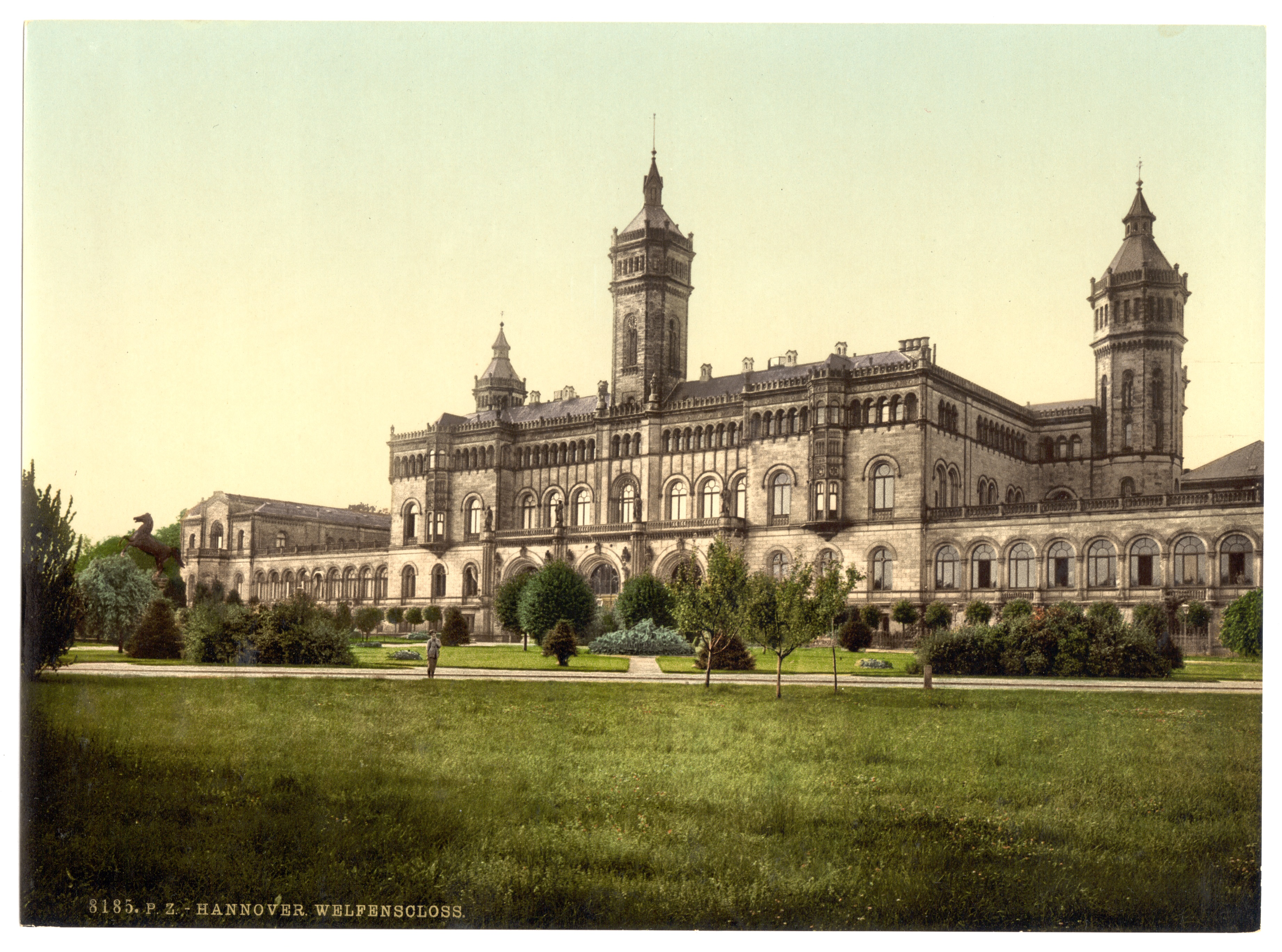
The Welfenschloss (lit. 'Guelph Palace'), now the main building of Leibniz University Hannover

Christian Heinrich Tramm (8 May 1819, Hamburg – 3 September 1861, Hanover) was a German architect who, in 1850, introduced the Rundbogenstil in Hanover.

== Biography ==
After studying at the Technical University of Hanover from 1835 to 1838, he continued his studies with Friedrich von Gärtner in Munich until 1840, then returned to Hanover to work with Georg Ludwig Friedrich Laves. The stables in the Georgengarten (1844) were his first independent project.

For many years, he was construction manager at the Court Theater (now the Staatsoper Hannover). Around 1850, he began using his familiar round-arch style (Rundbogenstil). A year later, he was one of the founders of the Architect and Engineer Association of Hanover, created by members of the Hanoverian Artists Association.

In 1855 he was appointed court architect; the youngest person to hold that position. The following year, he received a commission to create a new residence for George V; known as the Welfenschloss. That same year, he had his portrait painted by the court painter Friedrich Kaulbach and, in return, designed a home and studio for him: the Villa Kaulbauch on Waterloostraße.

At the time of Tramm's death in 1861, the Welfenschloss was still incomplete. It was finished by his cousin, Eduard Heldberg. After the fall of the royal family in 1866, it was repurposed by Hermann Hunaeus for use by the university.

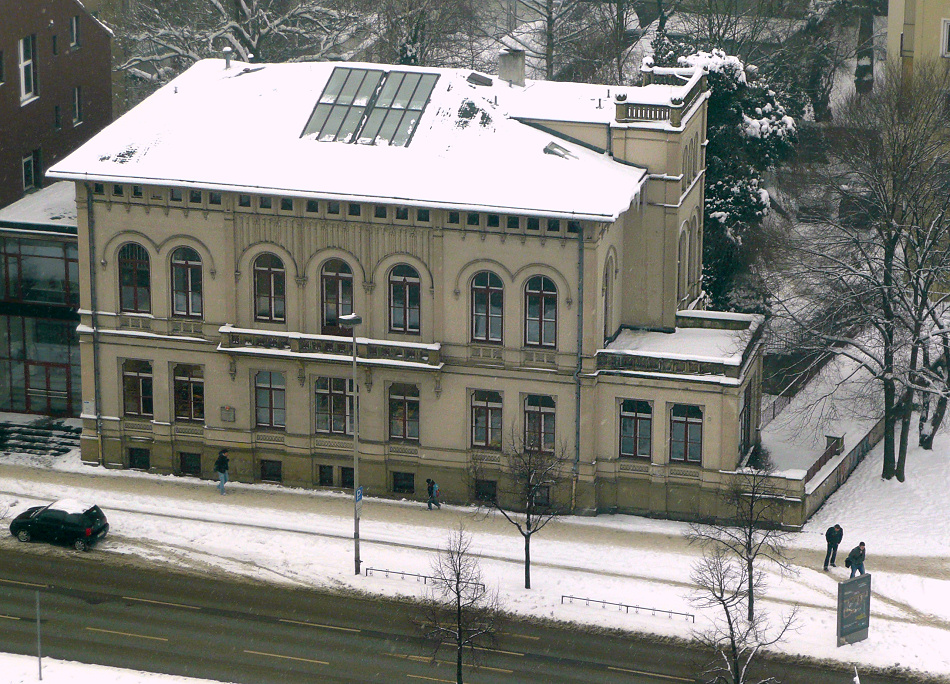
Villa Simon is another building by Tramm now used by the university

Both Tramm and his wife Emma died in 1861, possibly from tuberculosis. Their son Heinrich, only seven at the time, would become Stadtdirektor (city manager) of Hanover in 1891.
