= Conrad Wilhelm Hase =

German architect and Professor

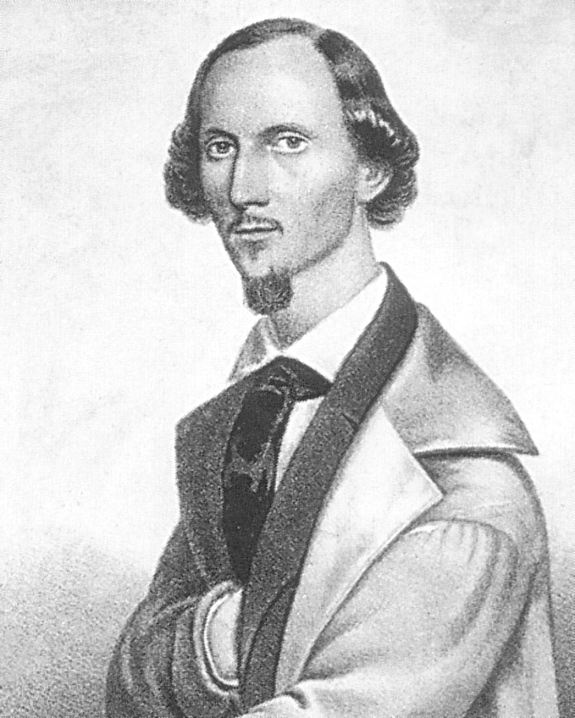
Conrad Wilhelm Hase, by an unknown artist (1845)

Conrad Wilhelm Hase (2 October 1818, Einbeck – 28 March 1902, Hanover) was a German architect and Professor. He was a prominent representative of the Neo-Gothic style and is known for his preservation work.

== Biography ==
He was one of ten children born to a tax collector. In 1834, he began his architectural studies in Hanover. After completing those studies in 1838, he was unable to find employment, so he returned home to assist his father. On the advice of one of his teachers, Ernst Ebeling, he began an apprenticeship as a bricklayer with the builder, Christoph August Gersting. He passed his journeyman's examination in 1840. He then went to observe various style of architecture on a six-month tour throughout Germany. A scholarship from the city of Einbeck enabled him to complete his studies at the Academy of Fine Arts, Munich.

In 1842, he returned to Hanover and took a position with Gersting's company. By 1843, he was able to obtain a position as construction manager for the Royal Hanoverian State Railways, where he designed and directed the work on several railway stations. In 1848, he began restoration work on the church at Loccum Abbey and found his true calling. The following year, he became a teacher at the Technical University of Hanover, and was one of the founders of the Architects and Engineers' Association. His students there included Edwin Oppler, Heinrich Gerber, Wilhelm Walter, Georg Kegel and Richard Kampf.

He married Agnes Maria Cornelia Leguinia Babnigg (1828–1865), a Hungarian singer, in 1853. They had three children. Two years after her death, he remarried; to Ottilie Franziska Annette Amalie Berckelmann (1832–1920) from Liebenburg.

He planned and designed more than 340 buildings; at least 100 of which were sacred in nature. He also participated in over 150 restoration projects. Among the awards he received were the Order of the Crown (1879), the Saxe-Ernestine House Order (1892), and the Order of the Red Eagle (1894).

His eightieth birthday was the occasion for numerous celebrations and honors. He died at his family's home, at the age of eighty-three. He was an honorary citizen of Hildesheim, and a street there is named after him.

== Notable works ==
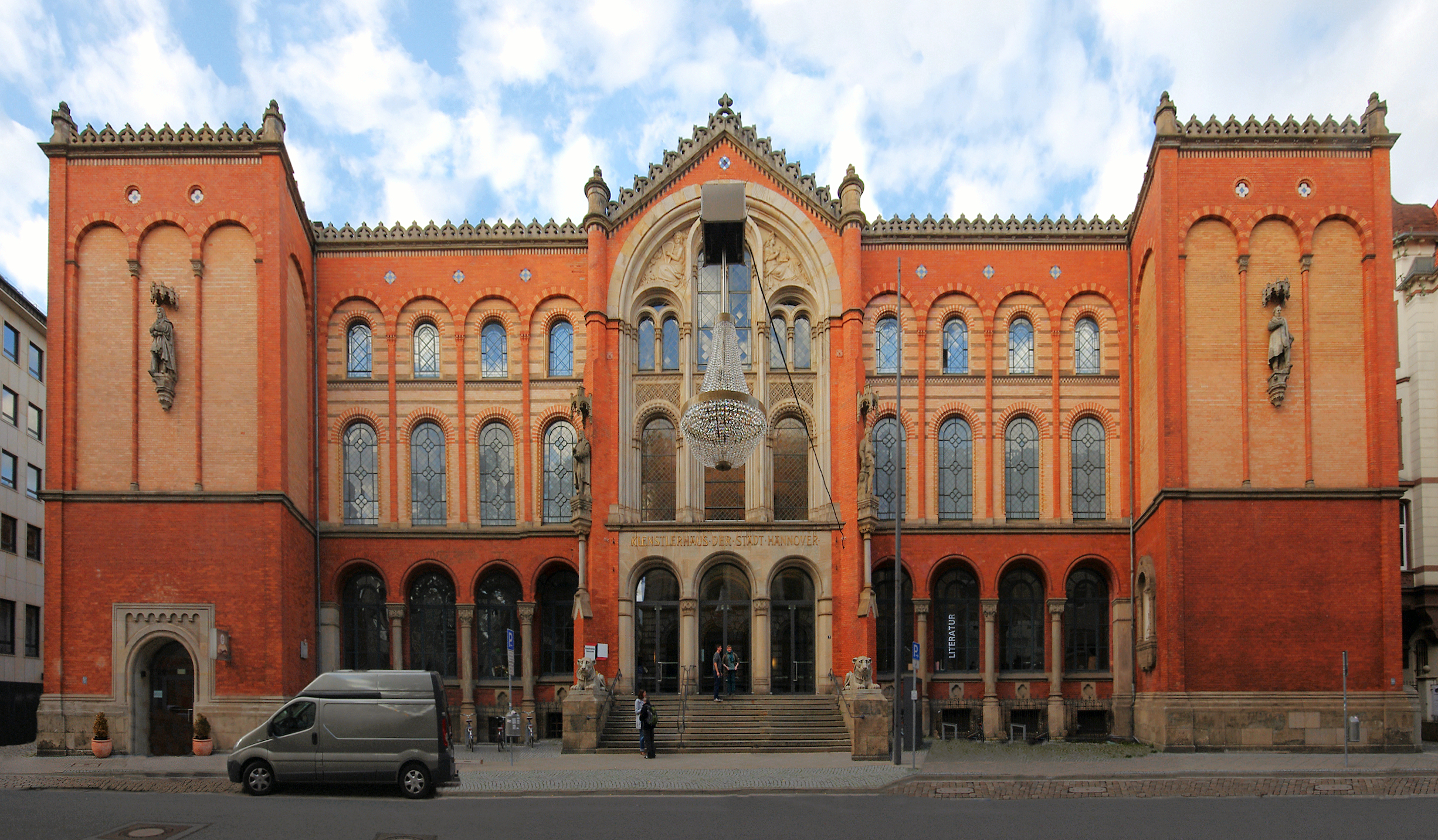
Künstlerhaus (Artists' House), Hanover

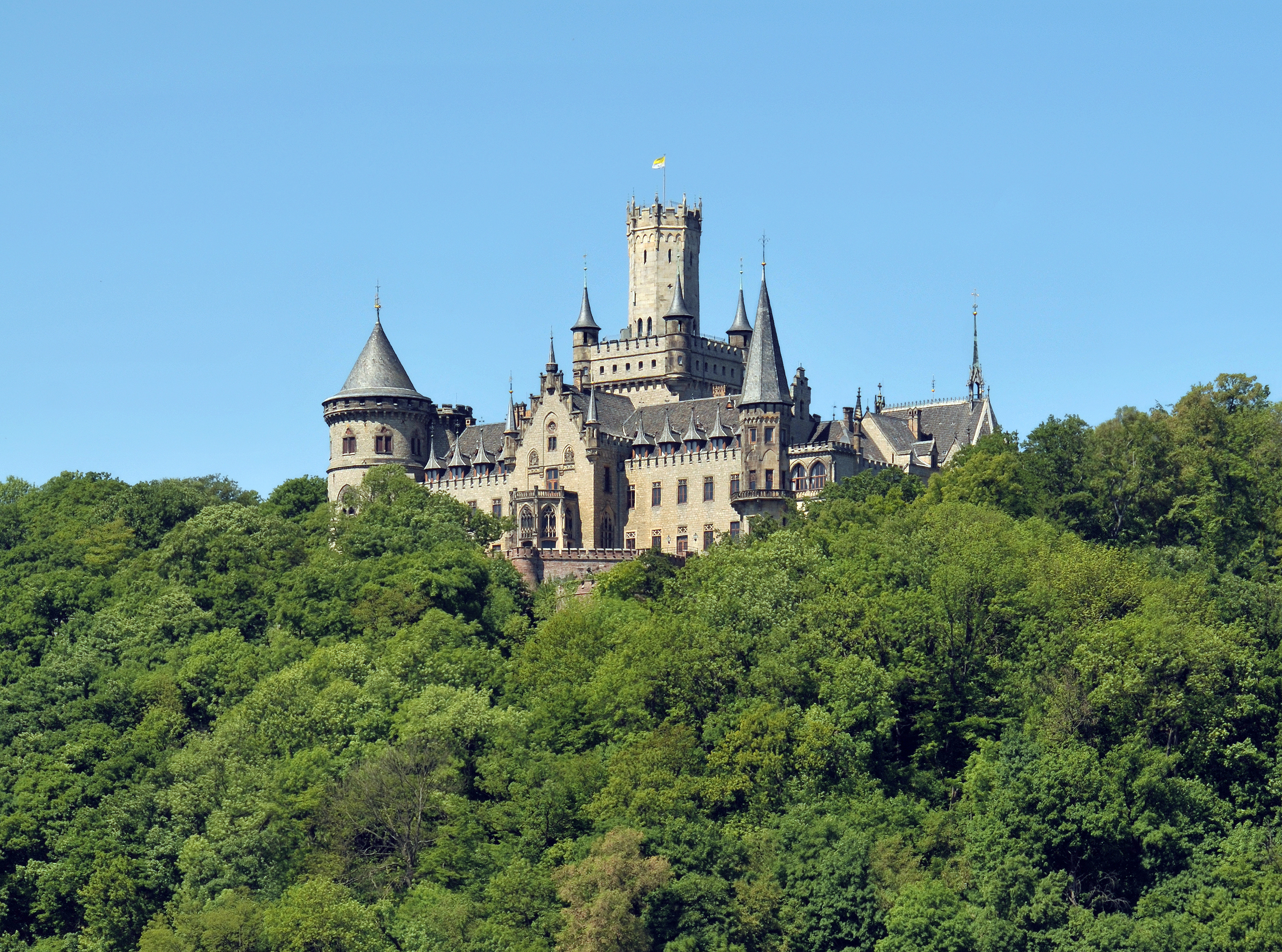
Marienburg Castle, near Hanover

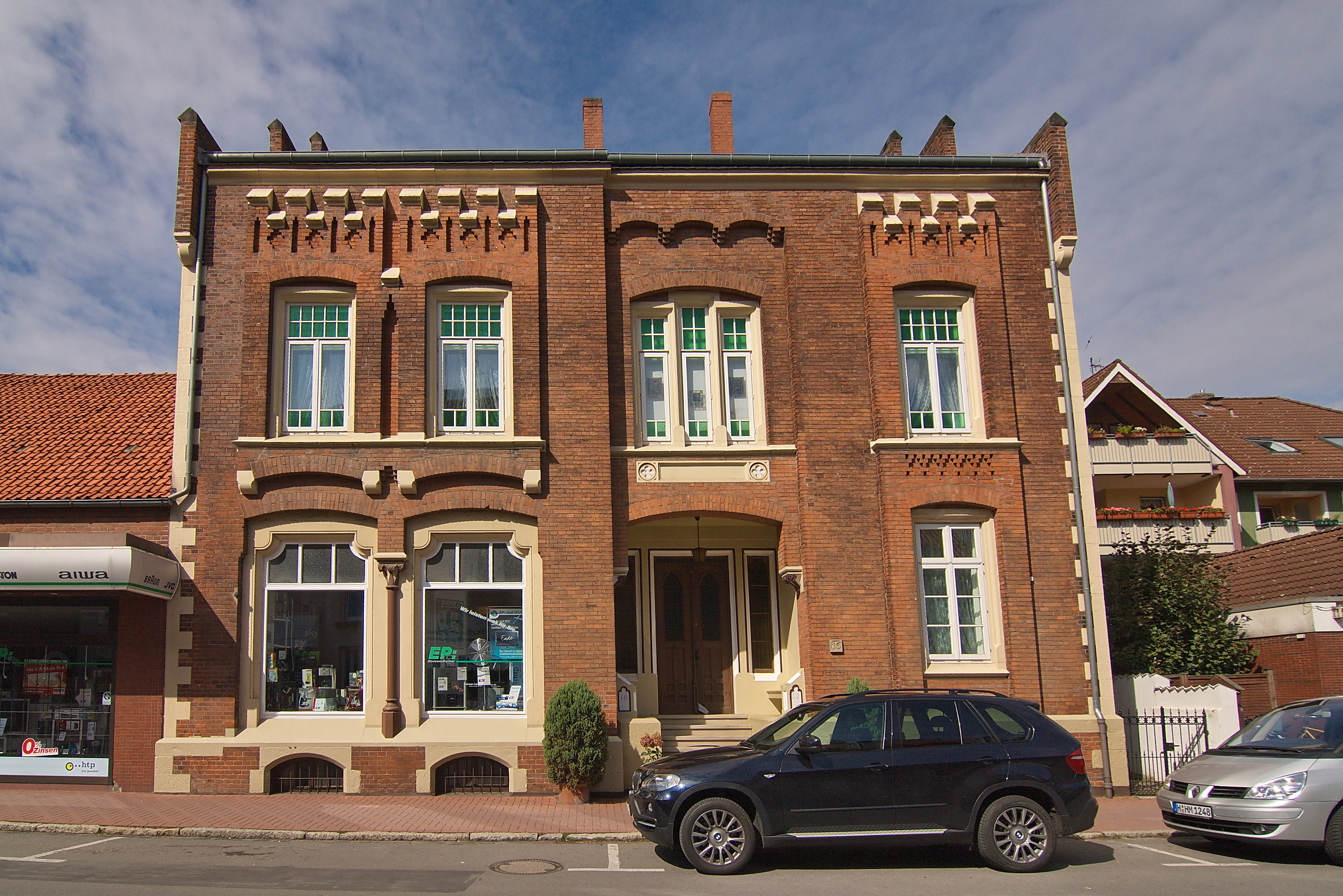
Mixed-use building in Wennigsen (1862)

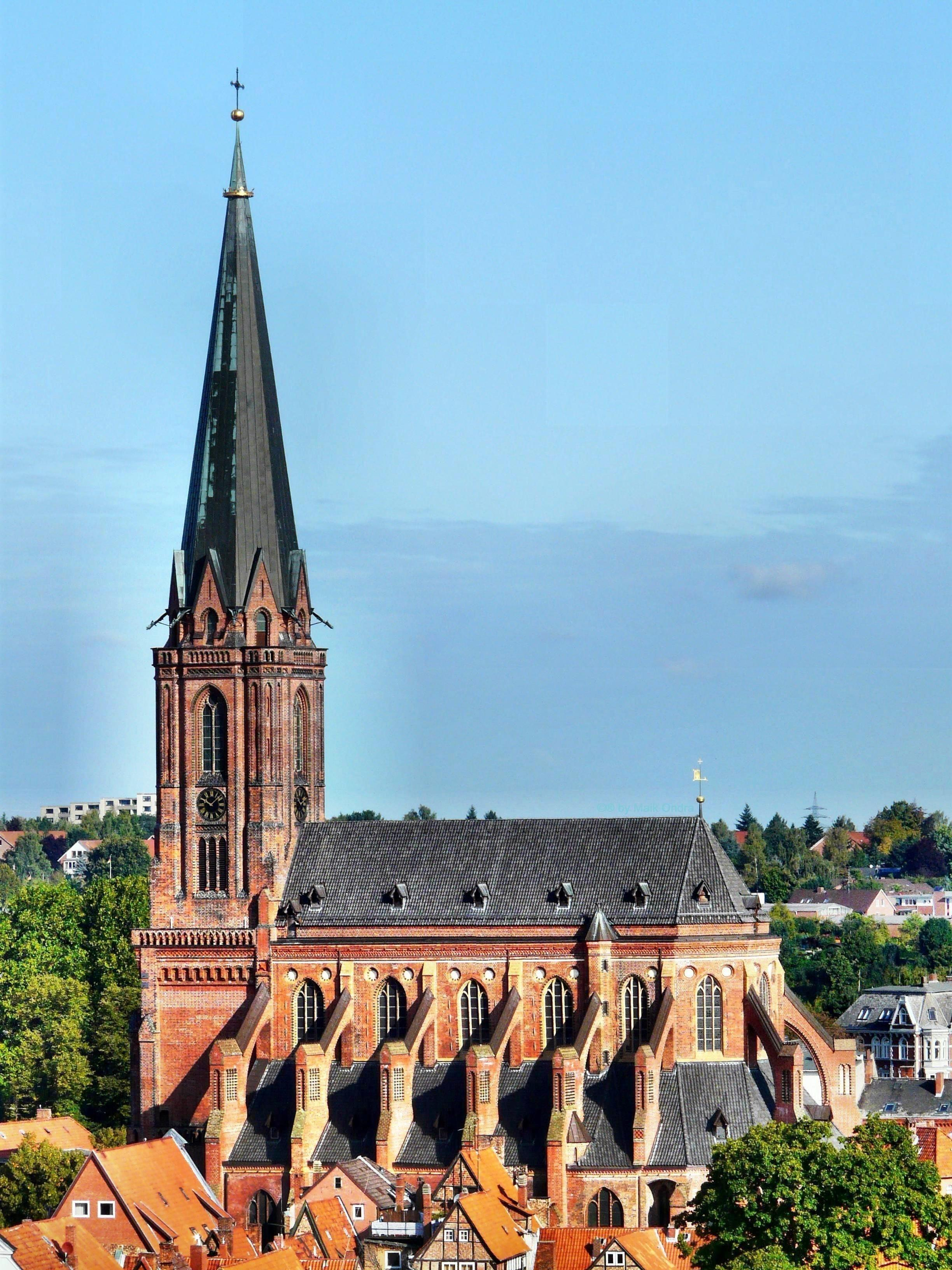
St. Nicolai, Lüneburg (restoration)

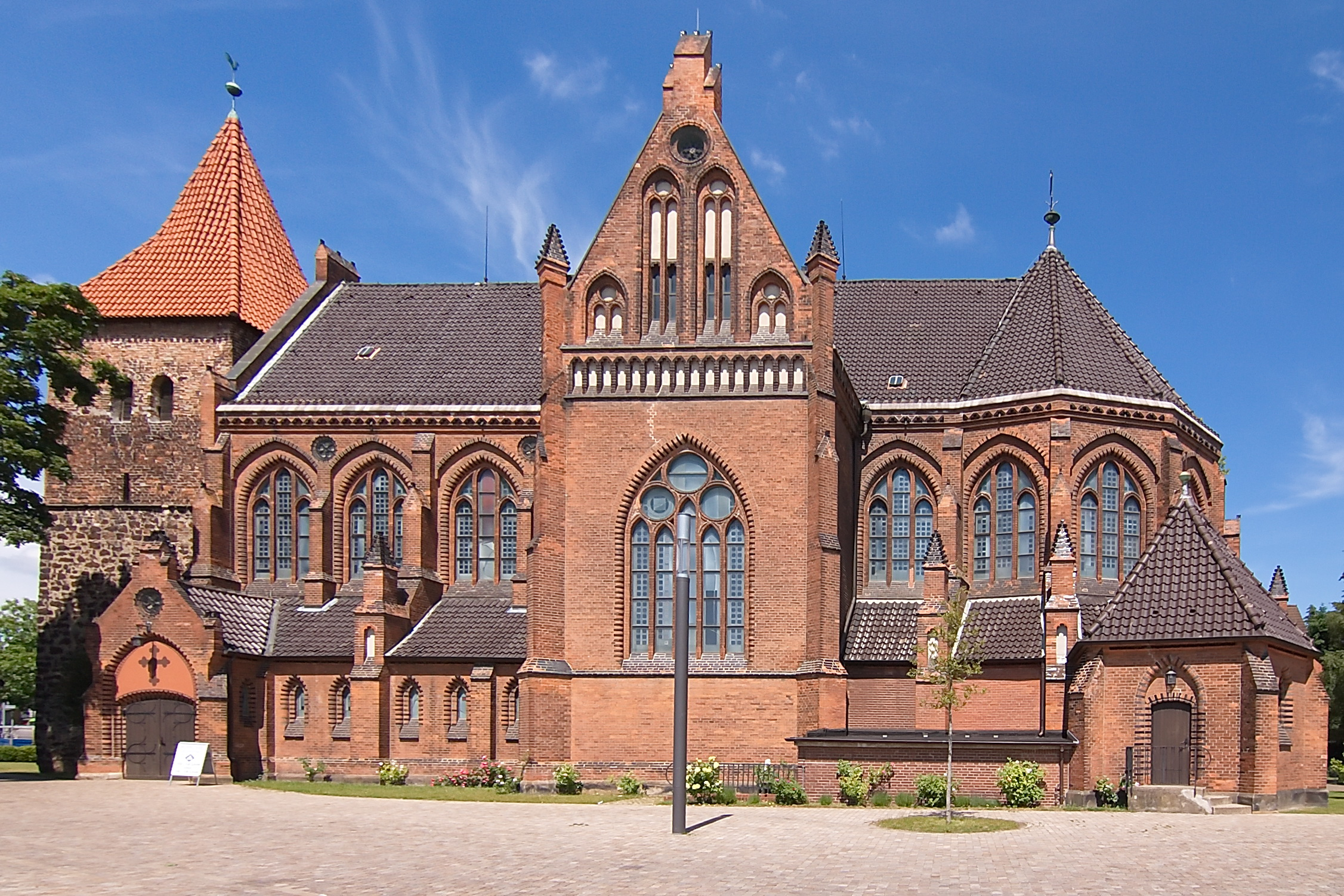
Elisabeth Church in Langenhagen (1867/1869)

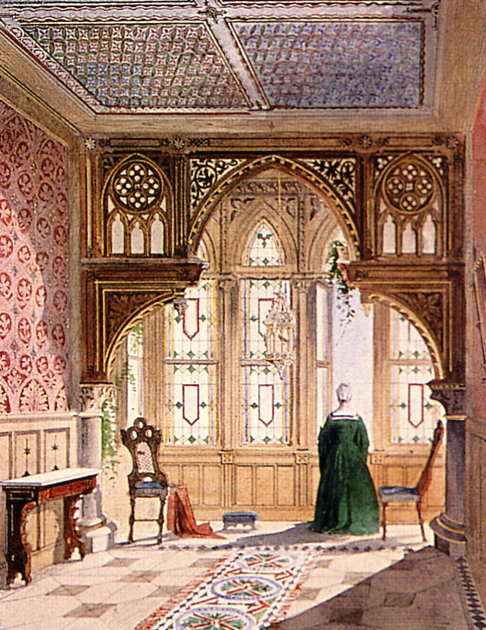
A room in Marienburg Castle (1863)
