= Lüneburg Water Tower =

Water tower in Lüneburg, Germany

Coordinates: 53°14′48.05″N 10°24′46.65″E

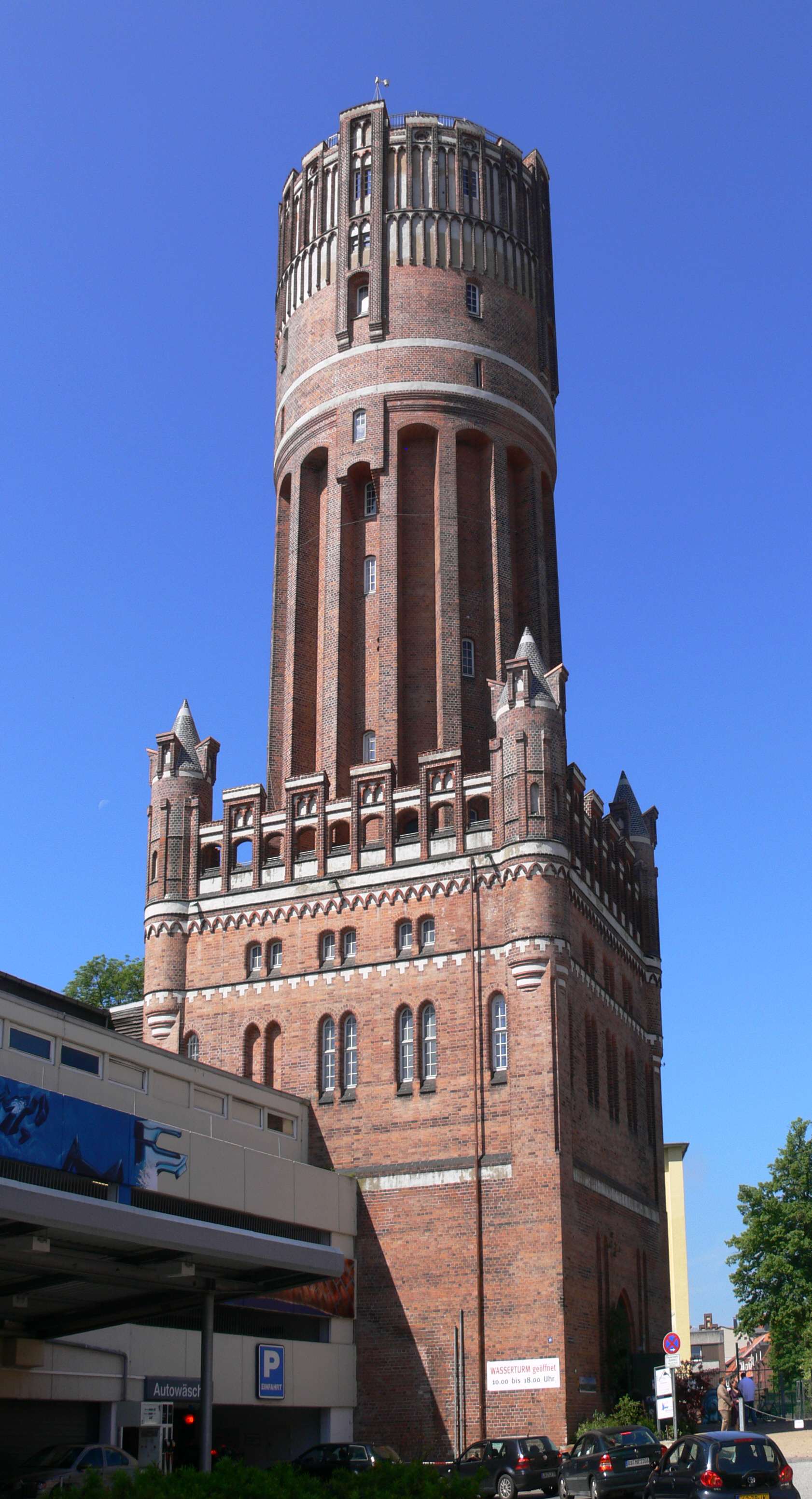
Lüneburg Water Tower and the Nordlandhalle parkingdeck to the left

Lüneburg Water Tower (German: Wasserturm Lüneburg) is a water tower in the southeastern part of the Lüneburg old town in Lower Saxony, Germany, built by the architect Franz Krüger (1873–1936), from designs by Richard Kampf. Its erection was initiated on 3 October 1905, and the tower was taken into use in November 1907. The water tower is 55 metres (180 ft) tall, and is the tallest building in the Lüneburg old town that is not a church. It stands between the considerably newer Nordlandhalle (which has been demolished meanwhile) and the Johanneum, the latter now used as a school. The tower consists of a square base of 18 metres (59 ft) and a round portion which is walled up around a 500 cubic metres (18,000 cu ft) large water tank. The upper part is carried by 16 solid columns.

The tower was in operation until summer 1986. It was planned to demolish it, but this was cancelled because of too high costs, and later the tower was declared a cultural heritage monument. Starting 1997 it was renovated for the EXPO 2000, and today it is in use as Scenic viewpoint.
