= Richard Kampf =

German architect

Notable buildings

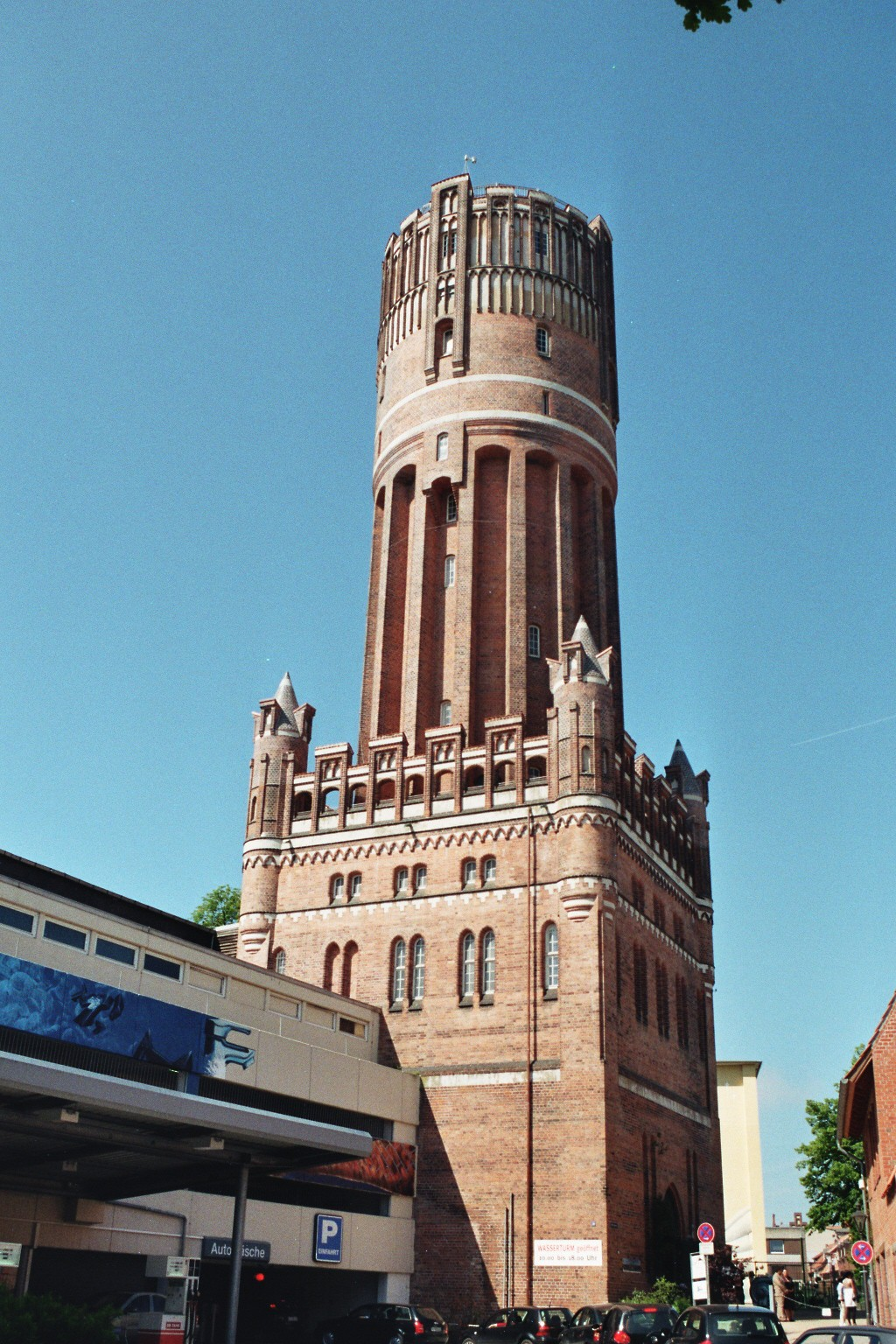
Lüneburg Water Tower

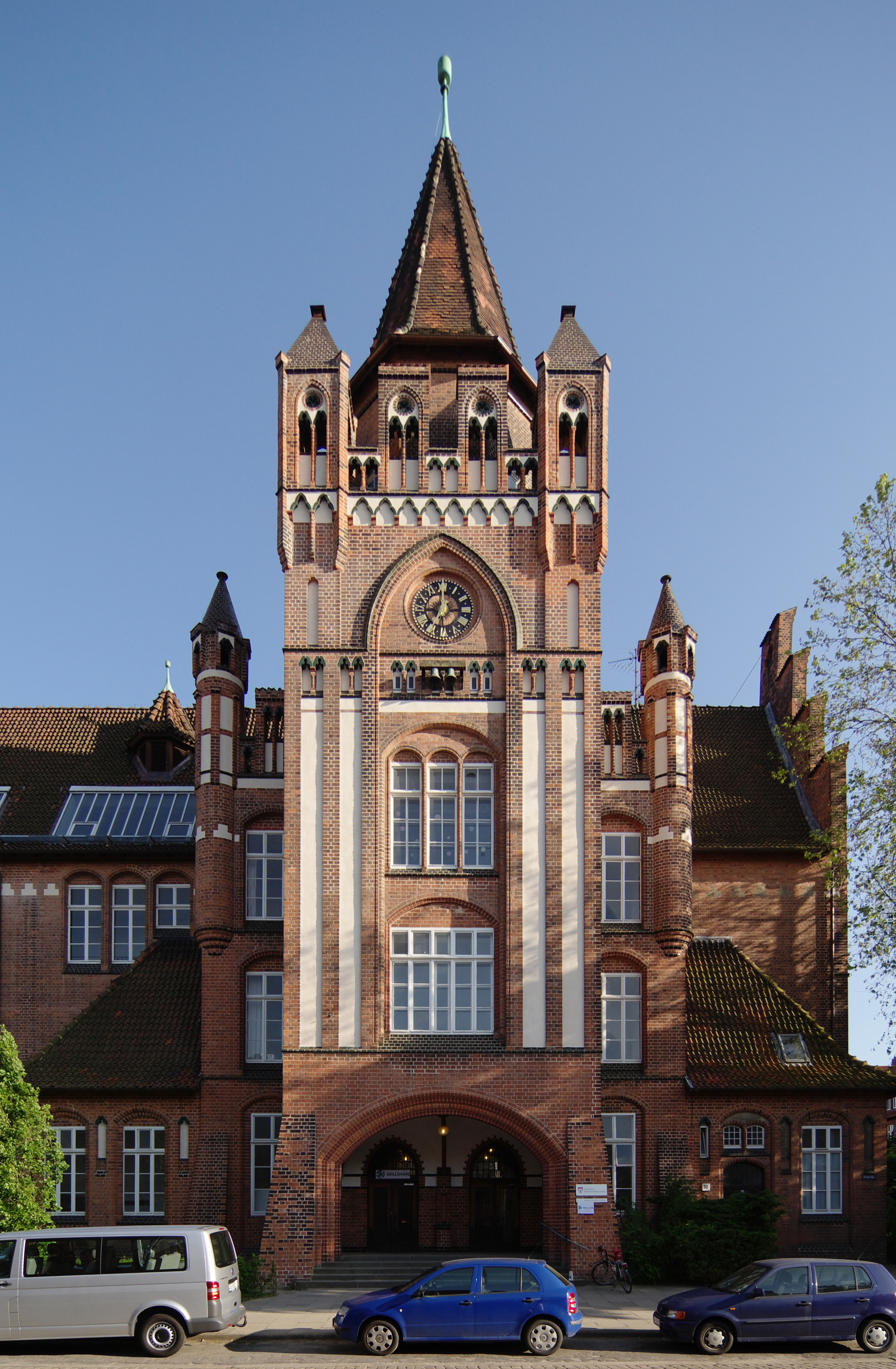
Wilhelm-Raabe-Schule

Christian Wilhelm Richard Kampf (17 March 1859, Hilden – 14 December 1919, Lüneburg) was a German architect in the Historic style.

== Biography ==
He was born to Wilhelm Kampf (1830–1877) and his wife, Emilie, née Spindler (1837–1919). Both came from industrial families who had business ties dating to 1832. His grandfather, Johann Wilhelm Kampf and Johann Christian Spindler (1801–1881) were the founders of Kampf & Spindler, a textile manufacturing firm in Elberfeld.

In 1877, he graduated from the Gymnasium Arnoldinum in Steinfurt, shortly after his father's sudden death while vacationing in Sanremo. At this point, he had been given no professional training, so his uncle, Gustav Adolph Spindler (1839–1895), took over management of the textile operations.

Relieved of family duties, he decided to become an architect and, in 1882, enrolled at the Technical University of Hanover. There, he studied with Conrad Wilhelm Hase and became a member of the Bauhütte zum Weißen Blatt, an architectural society.

From 1888 to 1890, he worked as a government architect in Ratibor. He resigned from the civil service to become the Stadtbaumeister (City Architect) in Lüneberg; a position he held until his death. Two of his most familiar designs are for the Lüneburg Water Tower (1905) and the Wilhelm-Raabe-Schule (1908).

He was married to Elisabeth Schirmer, daughter of the banker, Heinrich Bernhard Philipp Schirmer (1829–1900). He died in an accident, in front of his home, at the age of sixty.
