= Georg Kegel =

German architect

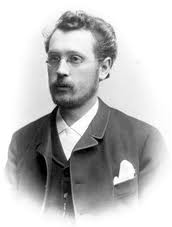
Georg Kegel (date unknown)

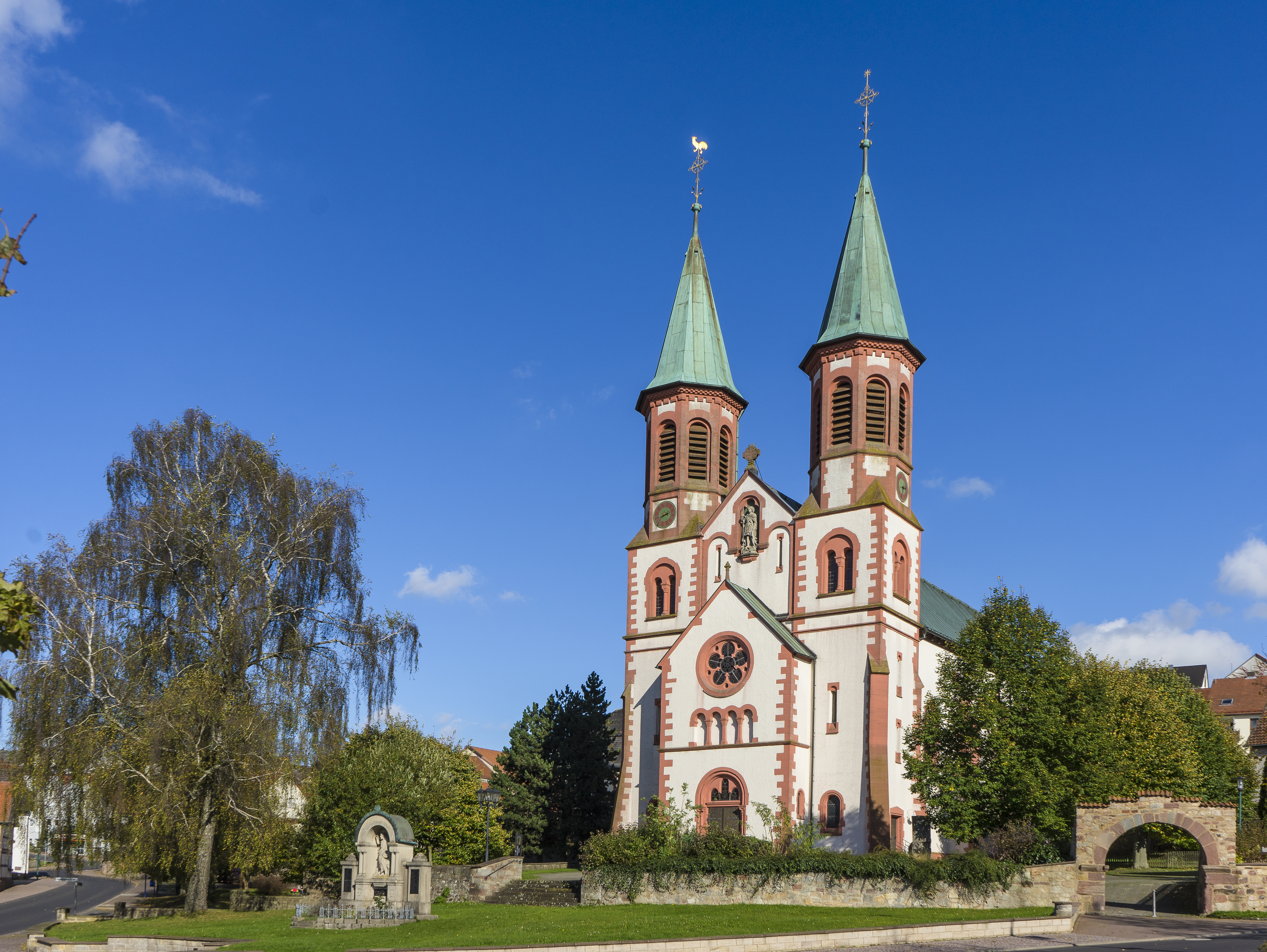
St. Georg Parish Church in Hofbieber

Georg Karl Wilhelm Kegel (22 September 1857, Kassel – 26 December 1912, Kassel) was a German architect in the Historical style, primarily known for his churches.

== Life and work ==
He was the eighth of eleven children born to the photographer and lithographer August Ernecke Georg Kegel (1821–1884) from Fulda, who opened a workshop and studio in Kassel in 1849.

After attending the Lyceum Fridericianum, he studied from 1874 to 1878 with Conrad Wilhelm Hase, at the Technical University of Hanover. From 1876 he was an active member of the Catholic fraternity "AV Gothia", associated with the Kartellverband.

In 1887, after passing the state examinations, he was approved as Master Builder. From 1888 to 1893, he was a teacher at the Baugewerkschule, now part of the University of Kassel. After that, he retired from the civil service and worked as a freelance architect until his death.

From 1903, he was a member of the Association of German Architects, and served as Chairman of the Kassel branch. For over twenty-five years, he was involved in preparatory work for the restoration of Saint Peter's Church, Fritzlar, but died shortly after the work began.

He designed twenty-four churches and chapels in the Roman Catholic Diocese of Fulda, primarily in the Neo-Gothic and Neo-Romanesque styles. Most make use of natural, local materials, such as stone and half-timbering. His best known works are the large parish churches of St. Maria and St. Familia, both in Kassel.

His son, Sturm Kegel, also became an architect.
