= Wilhelm Walter =

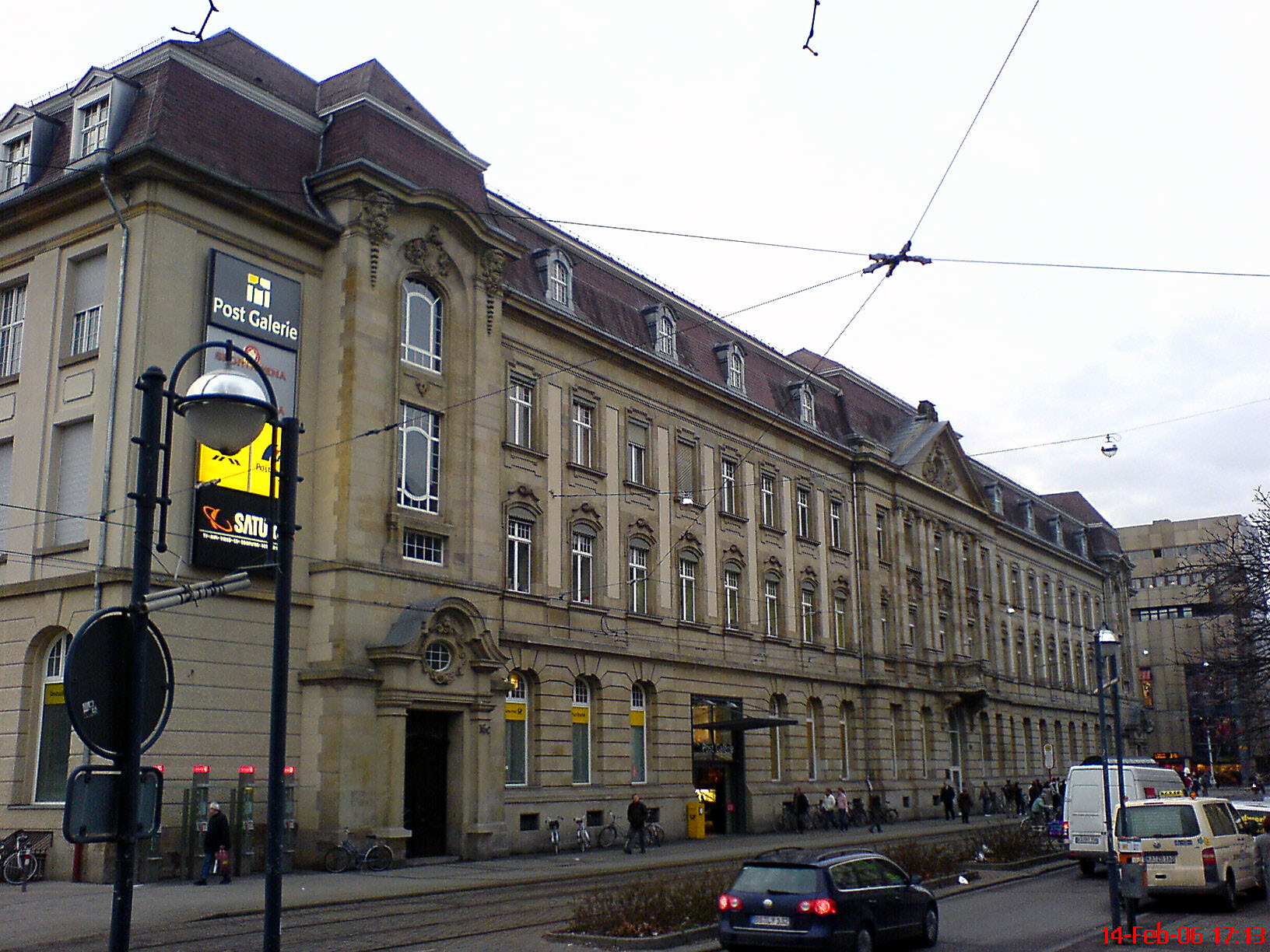
The Post Galerie, Karlsruhe

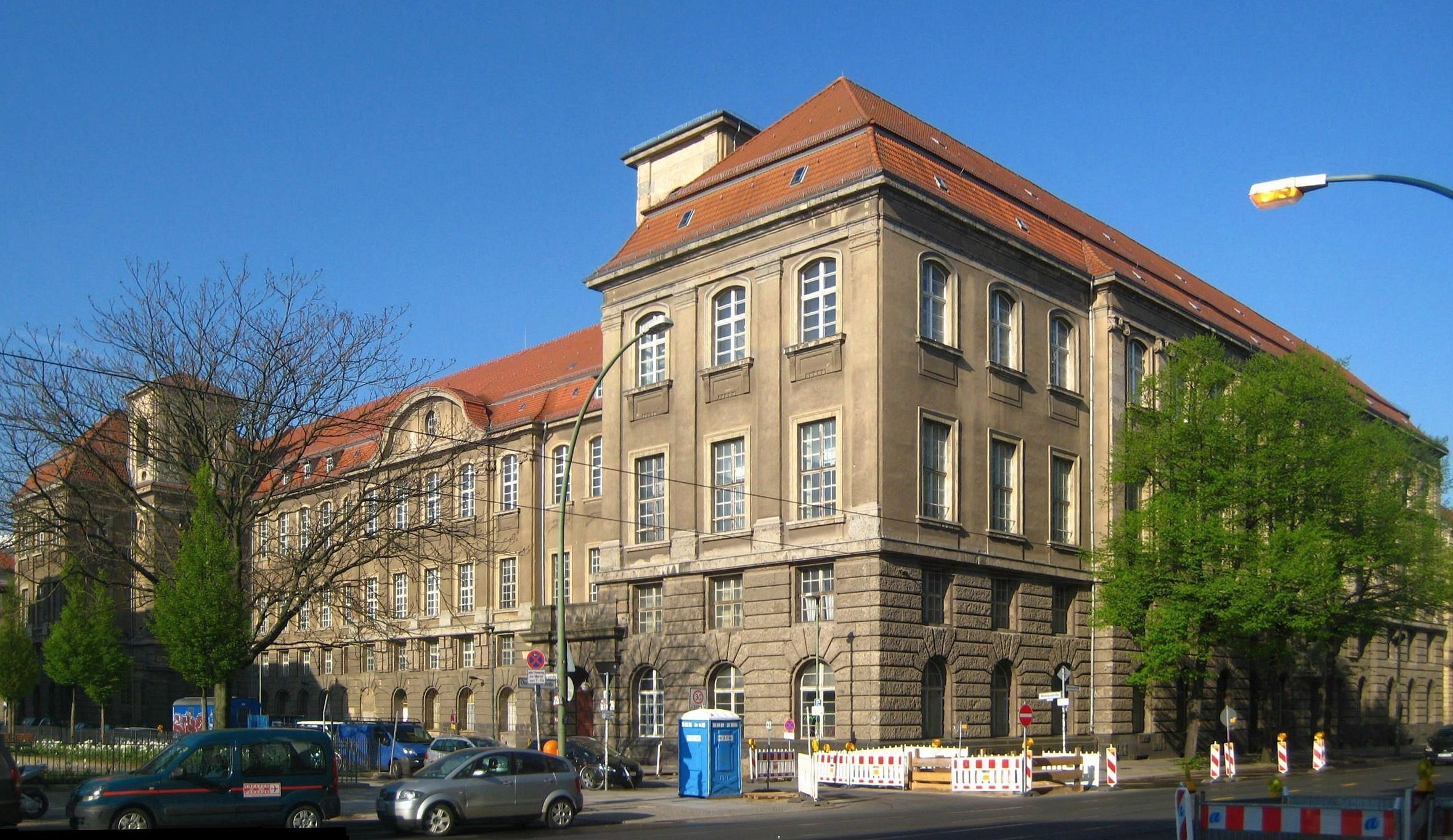
The former Main Telegraph Office, Berlin

Wilhelm Walter (16 June 1850, Rüdenhausen - 8 February 1914, Berlin) was a German architect and construction manager who worked with the Reichspost.

== Life and work ==
Walter was the son of a pastor and attended the Gymnasium Bernhardinum in Meiningen, from which he graduated in 1870. Shortly after, he joined the Army and fought with a field artillery regiment in the Franco-Prussian War. After returning from France, he served a brief apprenticeship as a construction worker, before enrolling at the Technical University of Hanover, where he studied with Conrad Wilhelm Hase. After graduating, he found work on several church projects, under the direction of Gotthilf Ludwig Möckel.

His talent and preference for Medieval architecture led him to a large number of commissions in Pomerania and Silesia. Due to these numerous activities, he didn't pass the Staatsexamen until he was forty-two. He then received a certification as a Royal Prussian Master Builder.

With these credentials, he was able to find employment as a Master Builder with the Reichspost in Berlin which, at that time, was being directed by Heinrich von Stephan and undergoing a major reorganization.. Stephan recognized Walter's talent, giving him extra duties, as well as enabling him to make research trips to Italy and England.

His first major, independent project involved designing, planning and managing construction of the Main Post Office in Karlsruhe (1897–1900). When he returned to Berlin, he was appointed Chief Construction Inspector and, later, Imperial Building Officer. Over the next few years, several post offices were built according to his designs. In 1911, he was named a Privy Councillor for construction-related matters, and became involved in projects throughout Germany.

His last major project was a complex that included the parcel post center and the Main Telegraph Office in Berlin. It was incomplete at the time of his death.
