= Christoph August Gersting =

German architect

Christoph August Gersting (also known as Christian Gersting and August Christian Gersting; 30 September 1802 in Hanover – 31 March 1872 in Hanover) was a German mason, senator, and architect. He is best remembered for his classicist style of architecture. He was an instructor of Conrad Wilhelm Hase.
