= Ernst Ebeling =

German architect and building official

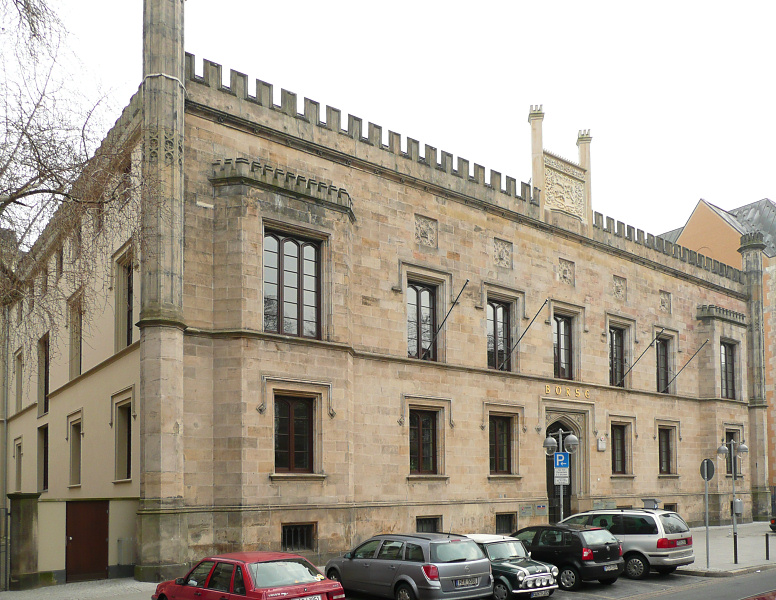
Hanover stock exchange

Ernst Friedrich Hieronymus Ebeling (29 October 1804, Hanover – 12 September 1851, Hanover) was a German architect and building official.

== Life and work ==
He began studying architecture under the Court Building Officer Diedrich Witting. In 1823 he continued his studies with Friedrich Weinbrenner in Karlsruhe. Following Weinbrenner's death in 1826, he spent two years on a study trip to Rome.

From 1829, he worked as an architect for military buildings. He became the first teacher of architecture at the new arts and crafts school in 1831. Following an outbreak of cholera on the Russian border, he and the Royal Surgeon, Georg Holscher, visited the quarantine zone there and designed similar facilities in Damnatz.

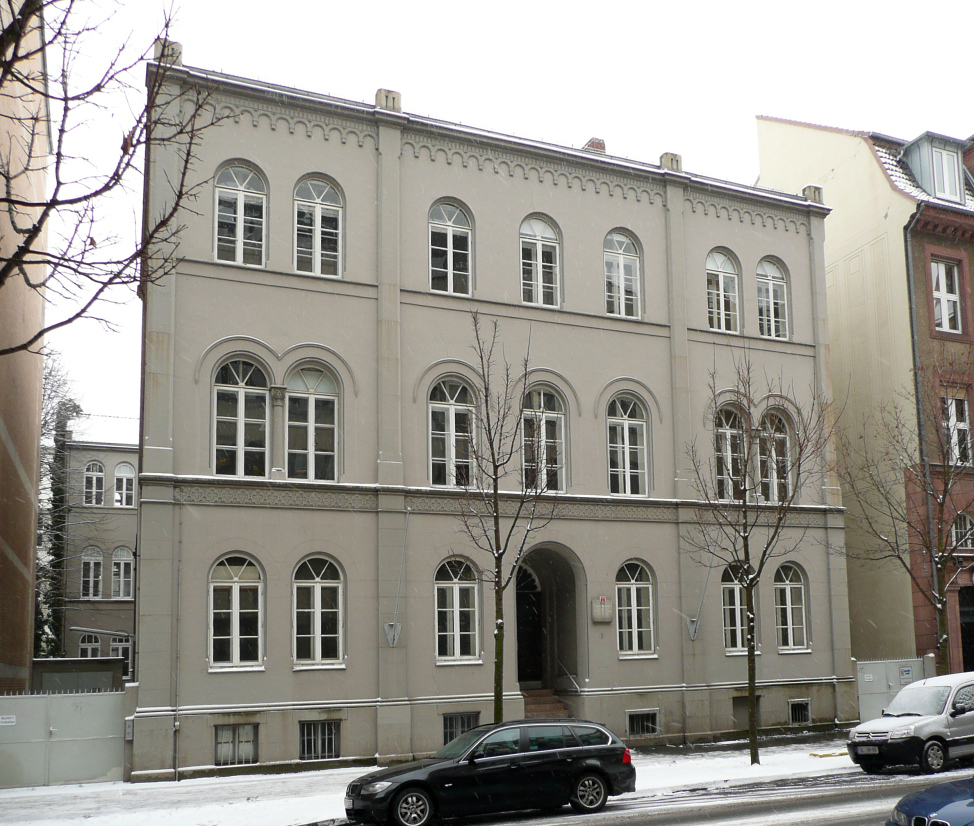
Ebeling's home

He returned to Russia in 1832, visiting Saint Petersburg, where he was involved in erecting the Alexander Column. He later visited England and, in 1843, made another trip to Italy. During this time, he designed several projects with the aim of introducing architectural styles from those countries to Hanover. Using the Palazzo Medici Riccardi as a model, he created the original main building for the Polytechnic School (1835–1837) and employed Florentine styles for the armory at Waterlooplatz, as well as a number of private buildings, one of which is now used by the stock exchange. He built his own home, in a similar style, in 1850. He was a co-founder of the Hanover Architects and Engineers Association.
