= Hanover =

Capital of Lower Saxony, Germany

Hanover Hannover (German) Hannober (Low German)
- City
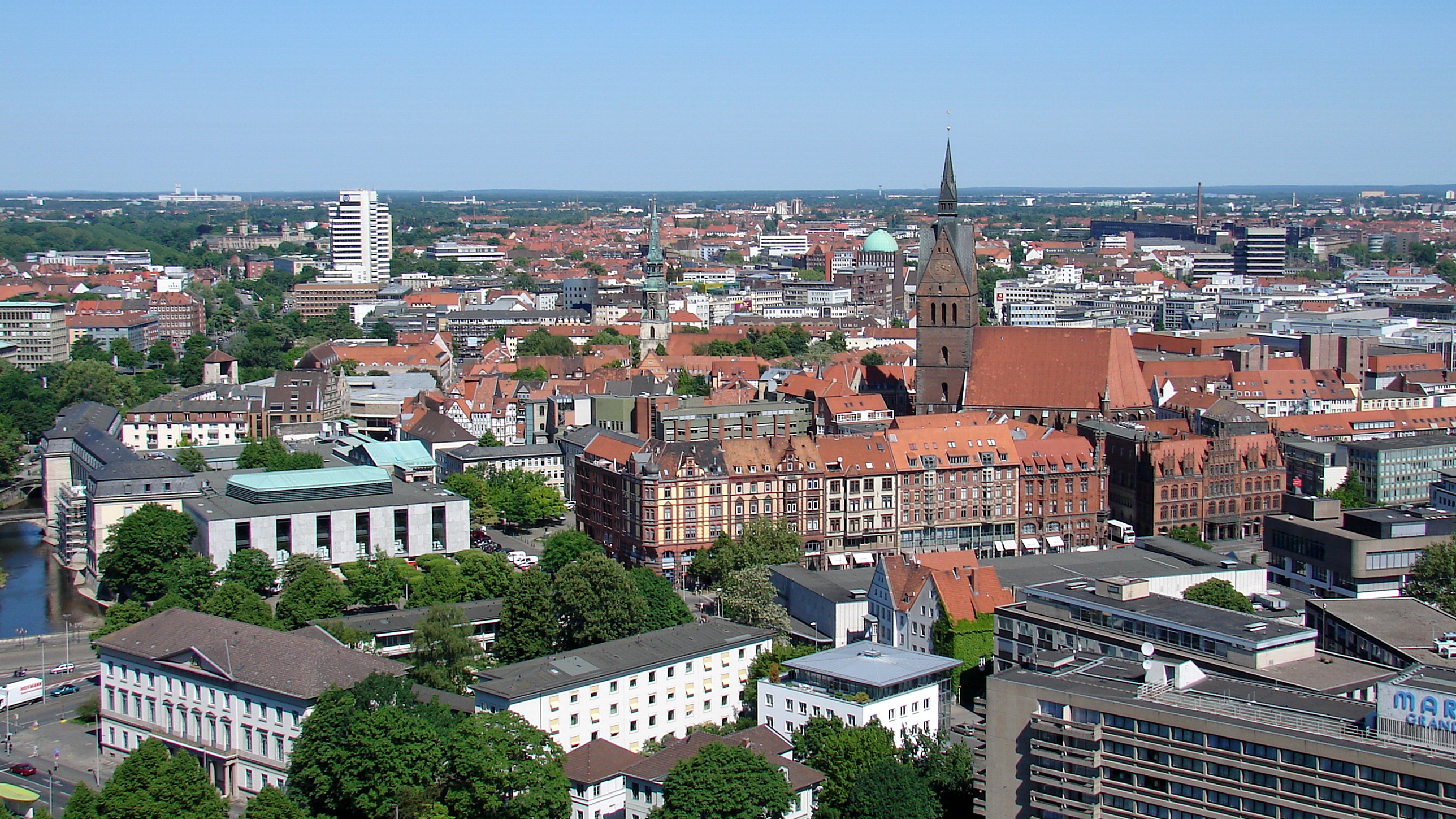
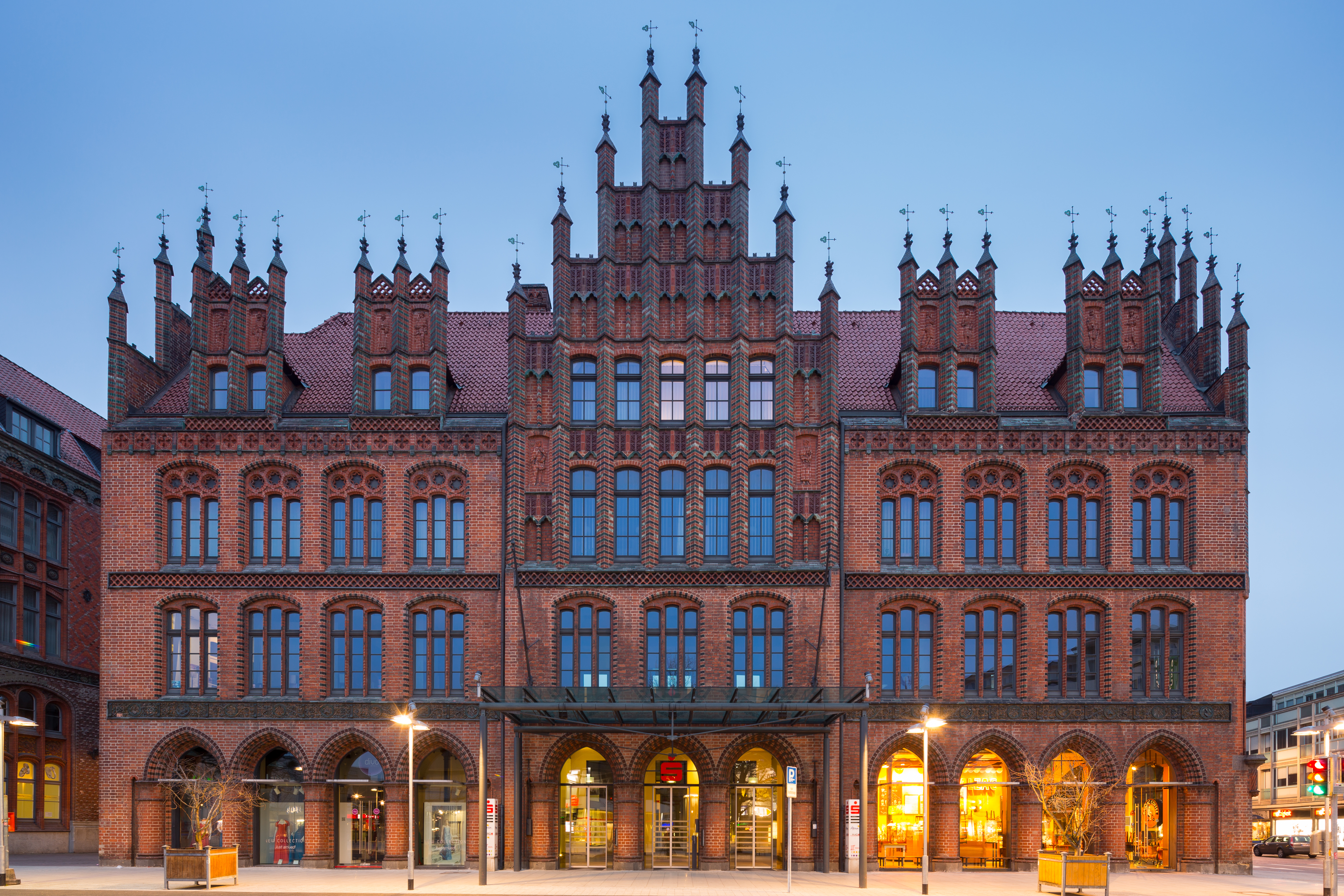
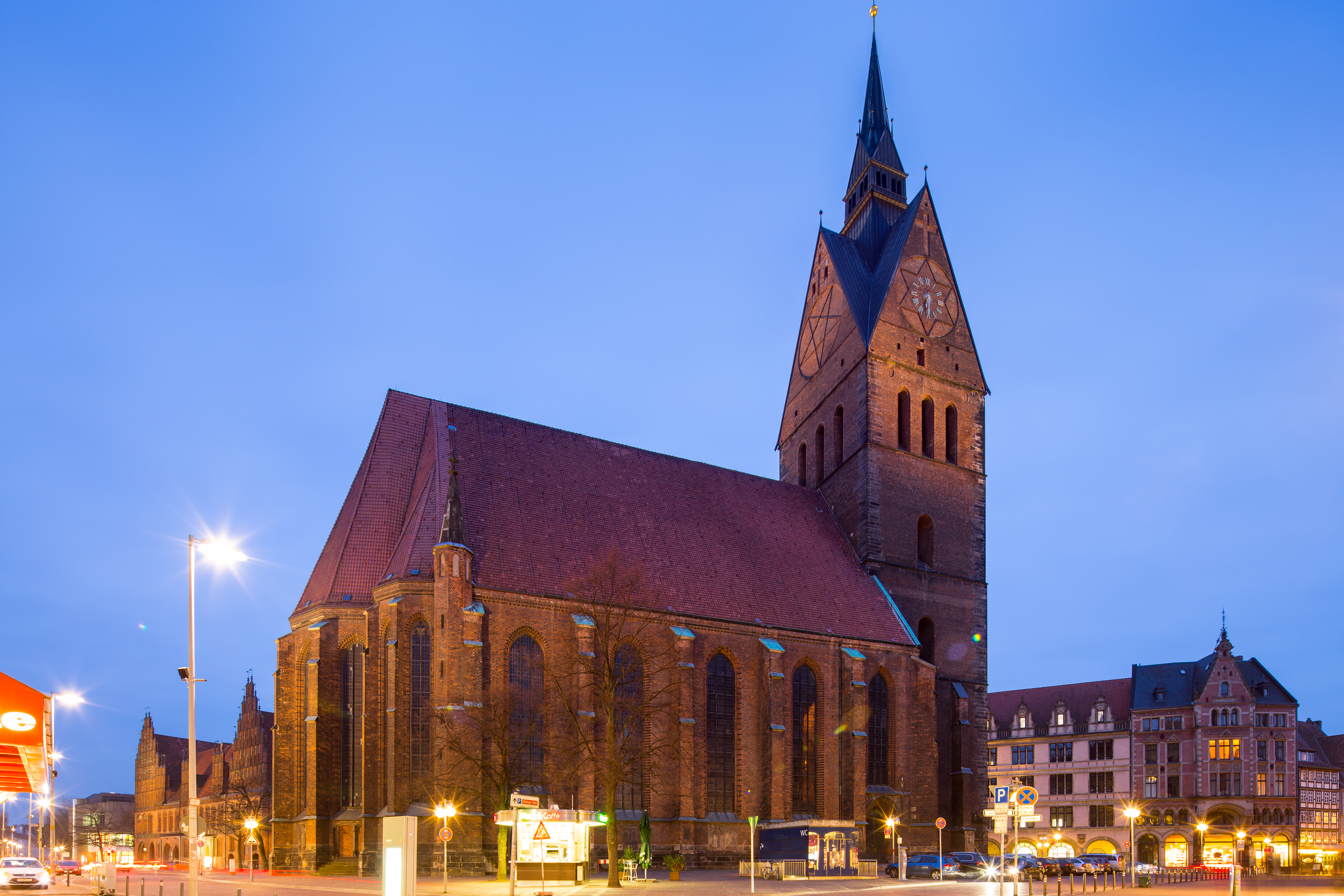
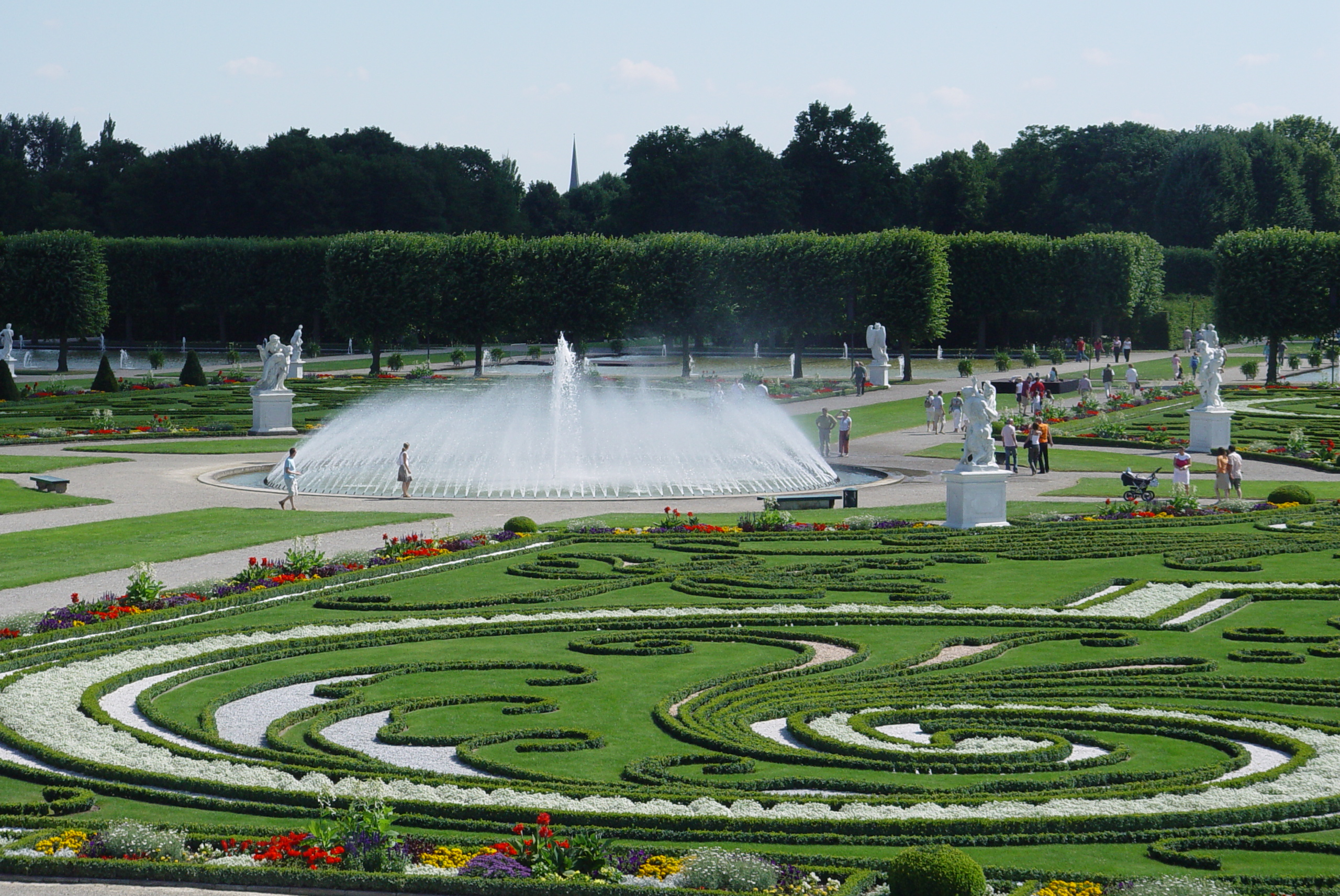
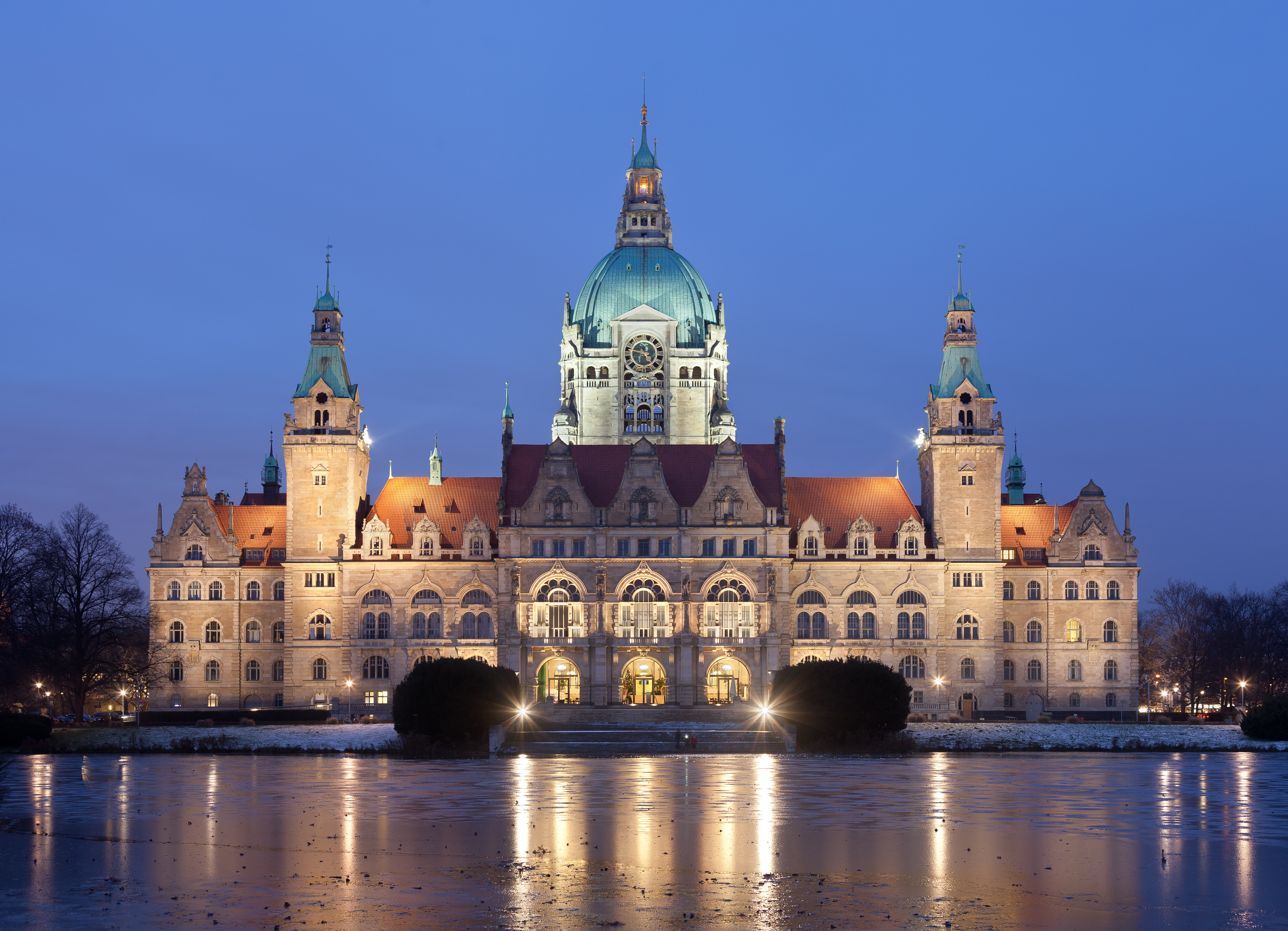
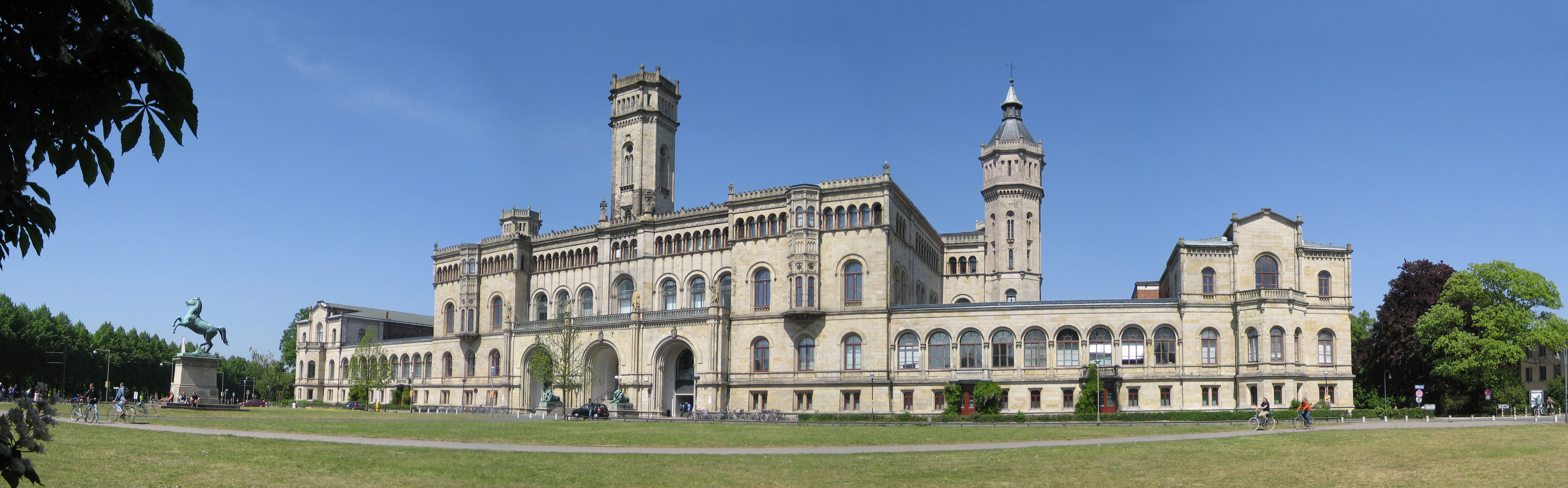
- View over the city centre from the New Town Hall Old Town Hall Marktkirche Herrenhausen Gardens New Town Hall University of Hannover

- Flag Coat of arms

- Location of Hanover within Hanover Region district
- Interactive map of Hanover
- Location within Germany Location within Lower Saxony
- Coordinates: 52°22′N 9°43′E
- Country: Germany
- State: Lower Saxony
- District: Hanover Region
- Subdivisions: 13 districts

Government
  - Mayor (2019–27): Belit Onay (Greens)
  - Governing parties: SPD/ Greens

Area
  - City: 204.01 km^{2} (78.77 sq mi)
- Elevation: 55 m (180 ft)

Population (2025-12-31)
  - City: 522,803
  - Density: 2,562.6/km^{2} (6,637.2/sq mi)
  - Metro: 1,119,032
- Time zone: UTC+01:00 (CET)
  - Summer (DST): UTC+02:00 (CEST)
- Postal codes: 30001–30669
- Dialling codes: 0511
- Vehicle registration: H
- Website: www.hannover.de

Hanover (Note: /ˈhænoʊvər, -nəv-/ HAN-oh-vər, HAN-ə-vər) or Hannover (German: Hannover [haˈnoːfɐ]) (Note: Low German: Hannober) is the capital and largest city of the German state of Lower Saxony. Its population of 535,932 (2021) makes it the 13th-largest city in Germany as well as the fourth-largest in northern Germany after Berlin, Hamburg and Bremen. Hanover's urban area comprises the towns of Garbsen, Langenhagen and Laatzen and has a population of about 791,000 (2018). The Hanover Region has some 1.16 million inhabitants (2019) and is the largest in the Hanover–Braunschweig–Göttingen–Wolfsburg Metropolitan Region, the 17th biggest metropolitan area by GDP in the European Union.

Before it became the capital of Lower Saxony in 1946, Hanover was the capital of the Principality of Calenberg (1636–1692), the Electorate of Hanover (1692–1814), the Kingdom of Hanover (1814–1866), the Province of Hanover of the Kingdom of Prussia (1868–1918), the Province of Hanover of the Free State of Prussia (1918–1947) and of the State of Hanover (1946). From 1714 to 1837 Hanover was by personal union the family seat of the Hanoverian Kings of the United Kingdom of Great Britain and Ireland, under their title of the dukes of Brunswick-Lüneburg (later described as the Elector of Hanover).

The city lies at the confluence of the River Leine and its tributary the Ihme, in the south of the North German Plain. The city is a major crossing point of railway lines and motorways (Autobahnen), connecting European main lines in both the east–west (Berlin–Ruhr area/Düsseldorf/Cologne) and north–south (Hamburg–Frankfurt/Stuttgart/Munich) directions. Hanover Airport lies north of the city, in Langenhagen, and is Germany's ninth-busiest airport. The city's most notable institutes of higher education are the Hanover Medical School (Medizinische Hochschule Hannover), one of Germany's leading medical schools, with its university hospital Klinikum der Medizinischen Hochschule Hannover, and the Leibniz University Hanover. The city is also home to International Neuroscience Institute.

The Hanover Fairground, owing to numerous extensions, especially for the Expo 2000, is the largest in the world. Hanover hosts annual commercial trade fairs such as the Hanover Fair and up to 2018 the CeBIT. It also hosts the biannual IAA Commercial Vehicles show, the world's leading trade show for transport, logistics and mobility. Every year Hanover hosts the Schützenfest Hanover, the world's largest marksmen's festival, and the Oktoberfest Hanover. In 2014, Hanover was named a UNESCO City of Music, joining UNESCO's Creative Cities Network.

== Etymology ==
The name of the city may derive from the German (am) hohen Ufer, literally 'on the high (river) bank'.

Traditionally, the English spelling is ⟨Hanover⟩. However, ⟨Hannover⟩, the German spelling with a double-⟨n⟩, has become more popular in English. Recent editions of Encyclopædia Britannica prefer the German spelling, (Note: In 2015 Encyclopædia Britannica said ⟨Hanover⟩ is the English spelling and an alternate title for their entry, but used ⟨Hannover⟩, with a double-⟨n⟩, as the title for their entry and in its text (that is written in English) except when referring to the historical kingdom and the province. In 2024 it used ⟨Hannover⟩ in the title and in the text, and ⟨Hanover⟩ as an alternative spelling and when referring to the historical kingdom and the province.) and the local government uses the German spelling on their English webpages. The English pronunciation, with stress on the first syllable, is applied to both the German and English spellings, which is different from German pronunciation, with stress on the second syllable and a long second vowel. The traditional English spelling is still used in historical contexts, especially when referring to the British House of Hanover.

== History ==
=== Early history ===
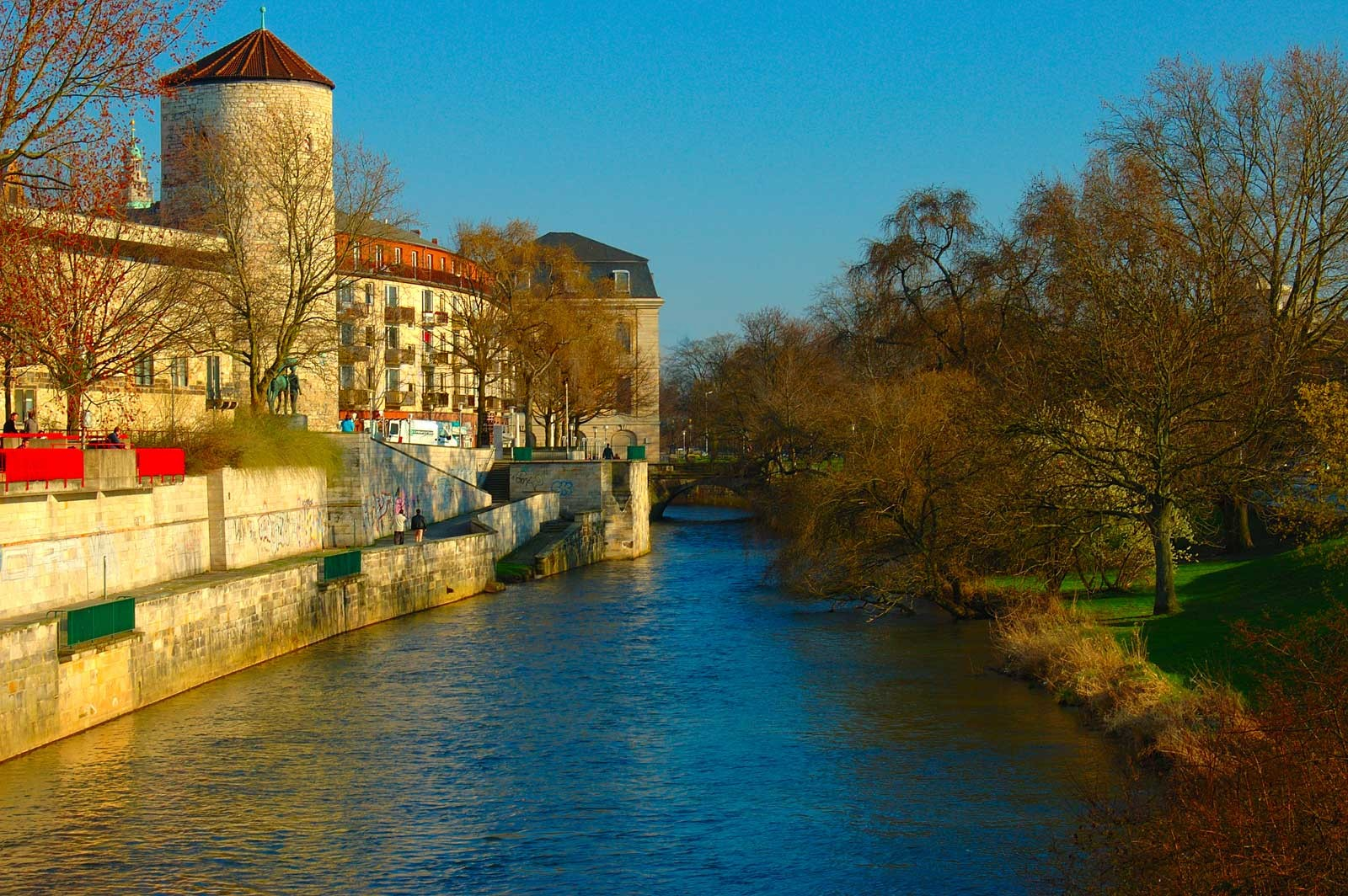
Leine river in Hanover, seen right of (1) the Beguine Tower and remnants of the city's medieval city wall that have been integrated into the Hanover Historical Museum and (2) the Leine Palace

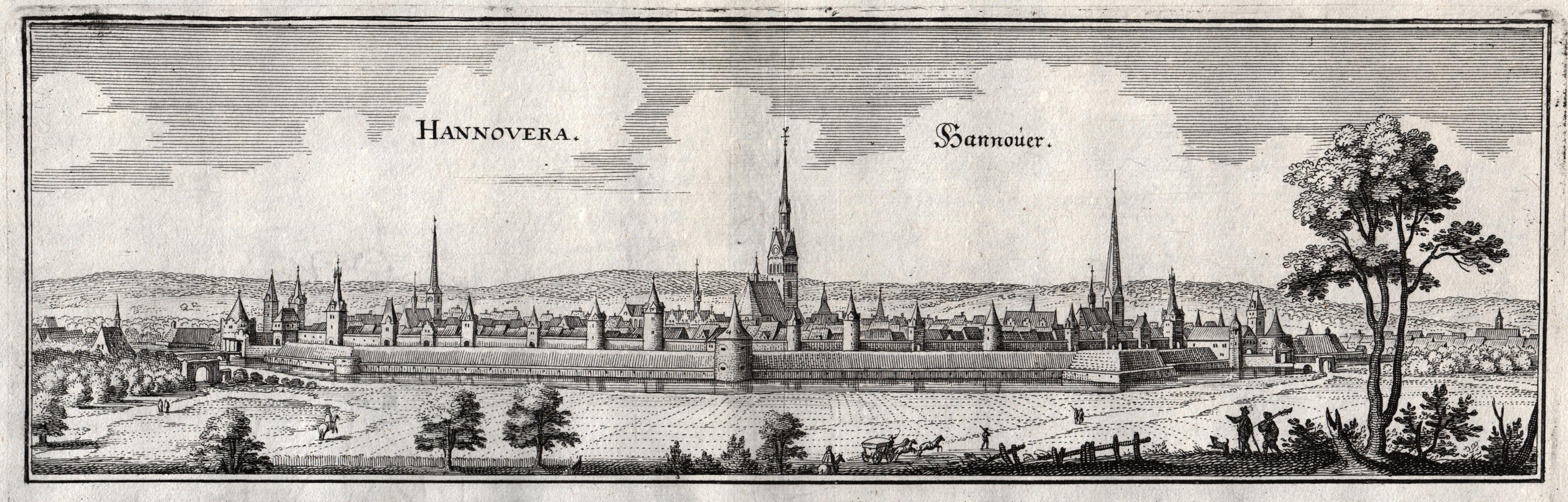
Illustration of Hanover by Matthäus Merian, first issued 1641

Hanover was founded in medieval times on the east bank of the Leine River. Its original name Honovere may mean 'high river bank', but that is debated. Hanover was a small village of ferrymen and fishermen that became a comparatively large town in the 13th century and received town privileges in 1241 because of its position at a natural crossroads. As overland travel was relatively difficult, its position on the upper navigable reaches of the river helped it grow from increasing trade. It was connected to the Hanseatic League city of Bremen by the Leine River and was situated near the southern edge of the wide North German Plain and northwest of the Harz mountains, so east–west traffic such as mule trains passed through it. Hanover was thus a gateway to the Rhine, Ruhr and Saar river valleys, and their industrial areas which grew up to the southwest and the plains regions to the east and north for overland traffic skirting the Harz between the Low Countries and Saxony or Thuringia.

In the 14th century, the main churches of Hanover were built, as well as a city wall with three city gates. The beginning of industrialization in Germany led to trade in iron and silver from the northern Harz Mountains, which increased the city's importance.

In 1636 George, Duke of Brunswick-Lüneburg, ruler of the Brunswick-Lüneburg principality of Calenberg, moved his residence to Hanover. The Dukes of Brunswick-Lüneburg were elevated by the Holy Roman Emperor to the rank of Prince-Elector in 1692, which was confirmed by the Imperial Diet in 1708. The accession of Elector George Louis to the British throne as George I in 1714 established a personal union between Great Britain and the Electorate of Hanover. Although they shared a monarch, the two states remained legally independent of each other.

The transfer of much of the electoral court to London adversely affected Hanover's economy, which had benefited from its status as a residence of the electors. The monarchs visited the city infrequently, and George III never visited Hanover during his reign.

During the Seven Years' War, the Battle of Hastenbeck was fought near the city on 26 July 1757. The French army defeated the Hanoverian Army of Observation, which led to the city's occupation as part of the Invasion of Hanover. It was recaptured by Anglo-German forces, led by Ferdinand of Brunswick, the following year.

=== 19th century ===
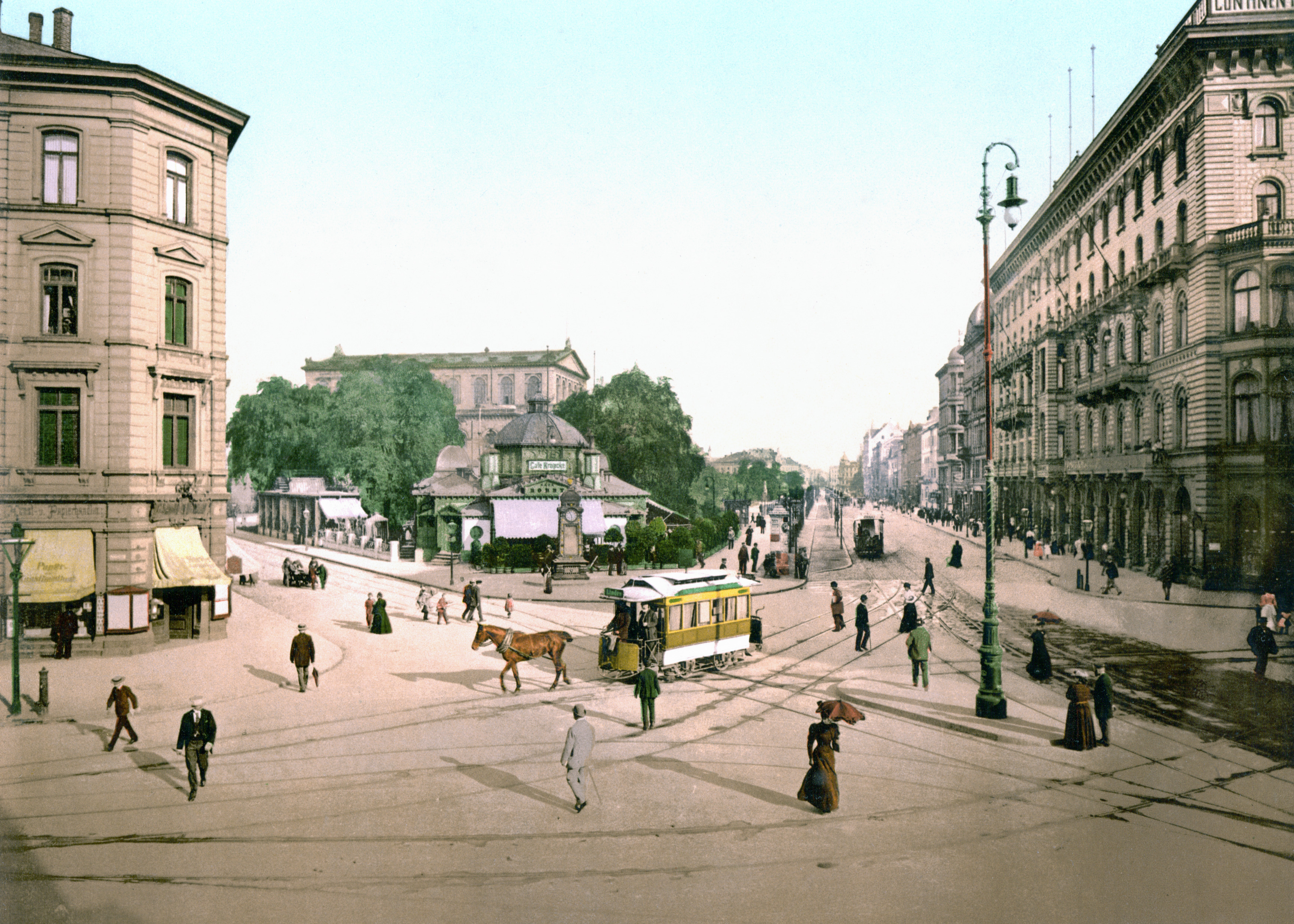
Am Kröpcke, 1895

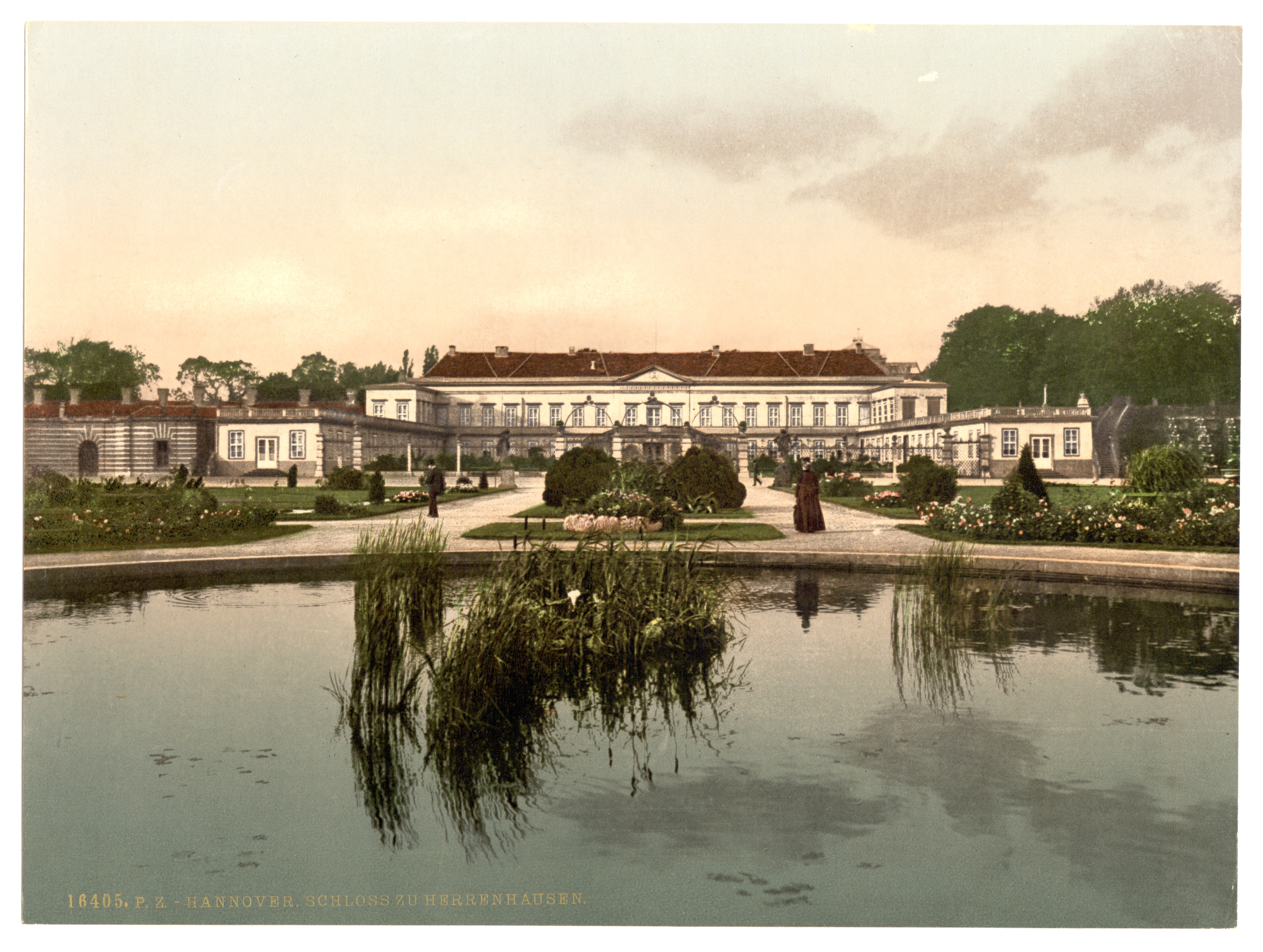
Schloss Herrenhausen, 1895

After Napoleon imposed the Convention of Artlenburg (treaty of the Elbe) on 5 July 1803, about 35,000 French soldiers occupied Hanover. The convention also required disbanding the Hanoverian Army. However, George III did not recognise the Convention of the Elbe, which resulted in a great number of soldiers from Hanover eventually emigrating to Great Britain, where the King's German Legion was formed. It was only troops from Hanover and Brunswick who consistently opposed France throughout the Napoleonic Wars. The Legion later played an important role in the Peninsular War and the Battle of Waterloo in 1815. In 1814 the electorate became the Kingdom of Hanover. From 1816, Prince Adolphus, Duke of Cambridge, represented the monarch in Hanover as governor-general and, from 1831, as viceroy.

The personal union ended in 1837 upon the death of William IV. Under Hanoverian succession law, male dynastic lines took precedence over female succession, so Victoria inherited the British throne while her uncle Ernest Augustus became King of Hanover. The royal court returned to Hanover, but the new king's annulment of the constitution of 1833 provoked protests from the city's municipal authorities. Hanover remained a royal capital until the kingdom was annexed by Prussia in 1866 during the Austro-Prussian War. Though Hanover was expected to defeat Prussia at the Battle of Langensalza in 1866, Prussia employed Moltke the Elder's Kesselschlacht order of battle to destroy the Hanoverian Army. Thereafter the city of Hanover became the capital of the Prussian Province of Hanover.

In 1872, the first horse railway was inaugurated, and in 1893, an electric tram was installed. A local newspaper, the Hannoverscher Kurier, was published in Hanover at this time.

=== Nazi era ===
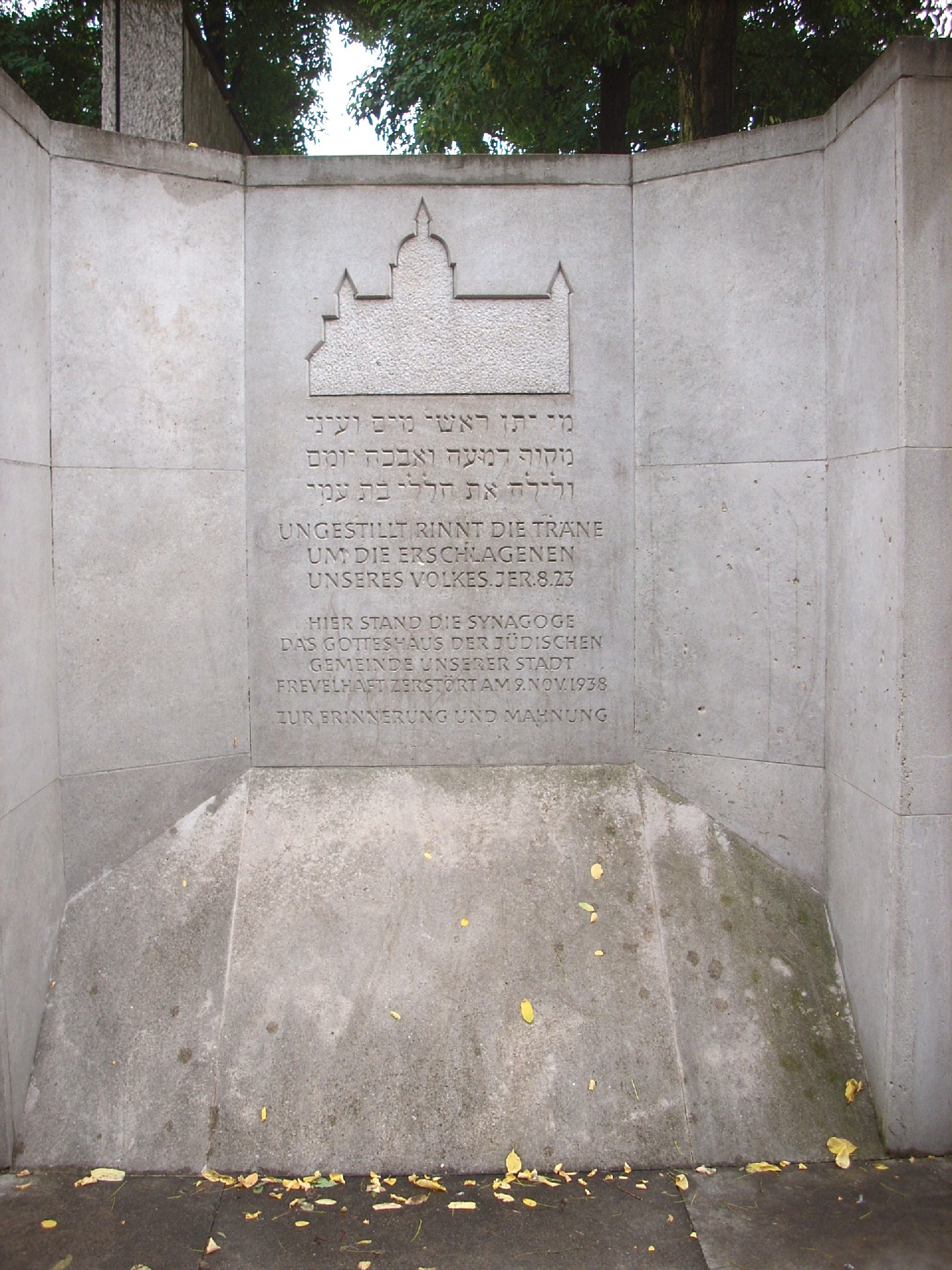
Synagogue site

After 1937 the lord mayor and the state commissioners of Hanover were members of the NSDAP (Nazi party). A large Jewish population then existed in Hanover. In October 1938, 484 Hanoverian Jews of Polish origin were expelled to Poland, including the Grynszpan family. However, Poland refused to accept them, leaving them stranded at the border with thousands of other Polish-Jewish deportees, fed only intermittently by the Polish Red Cross and Jewish welfare organisations. The Grynszpans' son Herschel Grynszpan was in Paris at the time. When he learned of what was happening, he drove to the German embassy in Paris and shot the German diplomat Eduard Ernst vom Rath, who died shortly afterwards.

The Nazis took this act as a pretext to stage a nationwide pogrom known as Kristallnacht (9 November 1938). On that day, the synagogue of Hanover, designed in 1870 by Edwin Oppler in neo-romantic style, was burnt by the Nazis.

==== World War II ====
In September 1941, through the "Action Lauterbacher" plan, a ghettoisation of the remaining Hanoverian Jewish families began. Even before the Wannsee Conference, on 15 December 1941, the first Jews from Hanover were deported to Riga. A total of 2,400 people were deported, and very few survived. During the war seven concentration camps were constructed in Hanover, in which many Jews were confined, but also Polish, French and Russian women. Of the approximately 2271 Jews who had lived in Hanover in 1939, fewer than 100 were still in the city when troops of the United States Army arrived on 10 April 1945 to occupy Hanover at the end of the war. Today, a memorial at the Opera Square is a reminder of the persecution of the Jews in Hanover. After the war a large group of Orthodox Jewish survivors of the nearby Bergen-Belsen concentration camp settled in Hanover.

There was also a camp for Sinti and Romani people (see Romani Holocaust), and dozens of forced labour subcamps of the Stalag XI-B prisoner-of-war camp for Allied POWs.

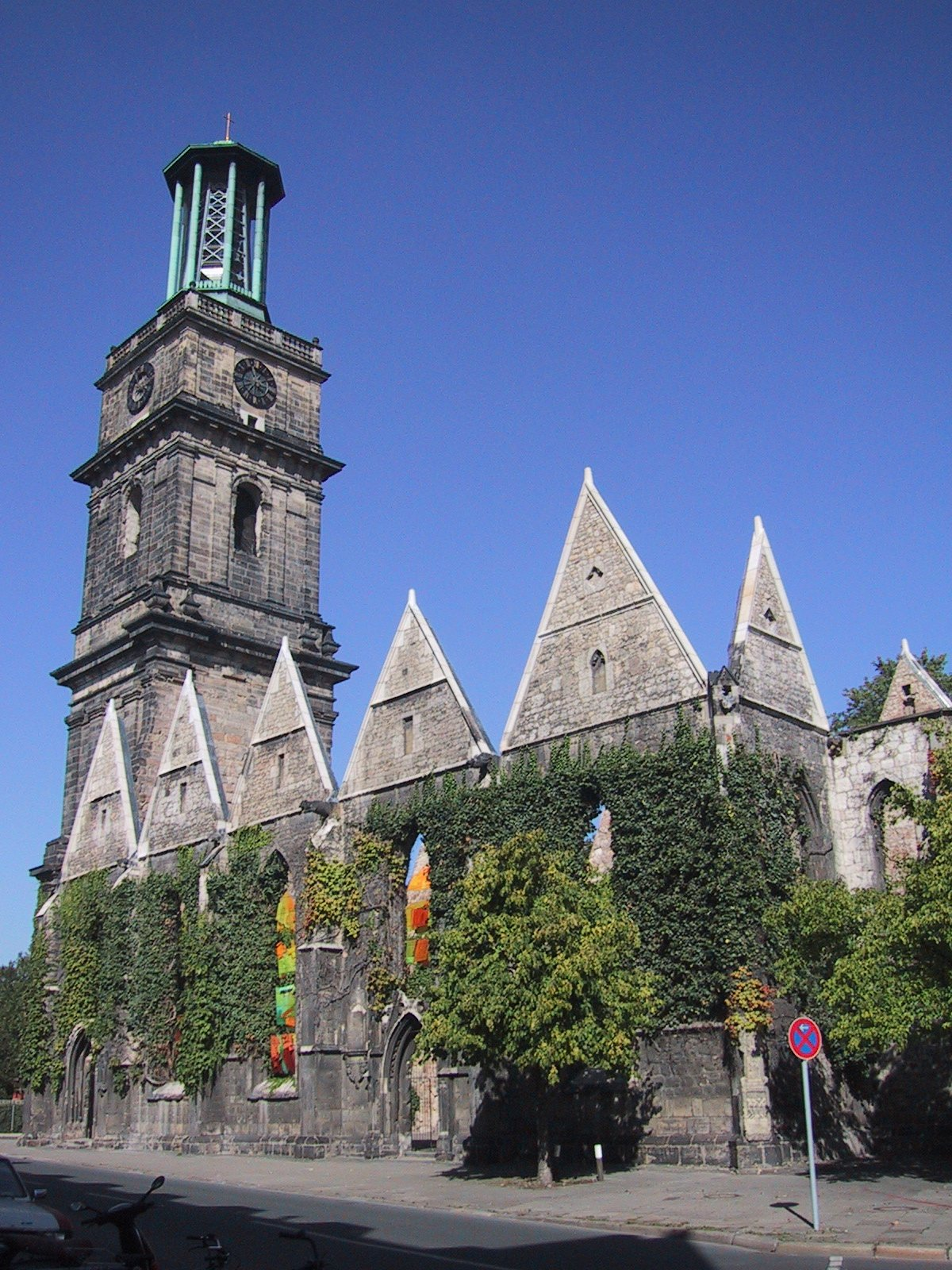
The Aegidienkirche was not rebuilt and its ruins were kept as a WWII memorial.

WWII map of Hanover in 1943

As an important railway and road junction and production centre, Hanover was a major target for strategic bombing during World War II, including the Oil Campaign. Targets included the AFA (Stöcken), the Deurag-Nerag refinery (Misburg), the Continental plants (Vahrenwald and Limmer), the United light metal works (VLW) in Ricklingen and Laatzen (today Hanover fairground), the Hanover/Limmer rubber reclamation plant, the Hanomag factory (Linden) and the tank factory M.N.H. Maschinenfabrik Niedersachsen (Badenstedt). Residential areas were also targeted, and more than 6,000 civilians were killed by the Allied bombing raids. More than 90% of the city centre was destroyed in a total of 88 bombing raids. After the war, the Aegidienkirche was not rebuilt and its ruins were left as a war memorial. Today around 25% of the city consists of buildings from before 1950.

The Allied ground advance into Germany reached Hanover in April 1945. The US 84th Infantry Division captured the city on 10 April 1945.

=== Post-war ===
Hanover was in the British zone of occupation of Germany and became part of the new state (Land) of Lower Saxony in 1946. In 1947, Hanover established its relationship with Bristol, England in exchanges of goods, students and music. This would link the two cities as models for establishing programs and organizations like Sister Cities International.

Today Hanover is a vice-president city of Mayors for Peace, an international mayoral organisation mobilising cities and citizens worldwide to abolish and eliminate nuclear weapons by 2020.

== Geography ==
=== Climate ===
Hanover has an oceanic climate (Köppen: Cfb) independent of the isotherm. Although the city is not on a coastal location, the predominant air masses are still from the ocean, unlike other places further east or south-central Germany.

The Hanover weather station has recorded the following extreme values:

- Its highest temperature was 39.2 °C (102.6 °F) on 20 July 2022.
- Its lowest temperature was −24.8 °C (−12.6 °F) on 22 January 1940.
- Its greatest annual precipitation was 935.4 mm (36.83 in) in 1981.
- Its least annual precipitation was 337.4 mm (13.28 in) in 1959.
- The longest annual sunshine was 1,971.6 hours in 1959.
- The shortest annual sunshine was 1,274.3 hours in 1998.

Climate data for Hannover (1991–2020 normals, extremes 1936–2026)
Month	Jan	Feb	Mar	Apr	May	Jun	Jul	Aug	Sep	Oct	Nov	Dec	Year
Record high °C (°F)	17.0 (62.6)	19.1 (66.4)	24.4 (75.9)	29.7 (85.5)	32.2 (90.0)	37.7 (99.9)	39.2 (102.6)	38.0 (100.4)	33.0 (91.4)	27.4 (81.3)	20.7 (69.3)	17.0 (62.6)	39.2 (102.6)
Mean maximum °C (°F)	11.7 (53.1)	12.9 (55.2)	17.6 (63.7)	22.7 (72.9)	27.1 (80.8)	30.4 (86.7)	31.7 (89.1)	32.1 (89.8)	26.5 (79.7)	21.0 (69.8)	15.4 (59.7)	12.1 (53.8)	33.8 (92.8)
Mean daily maximum °C (°F)	4.4 (39.9)	5.5 (41.9)	9.3 (48.7)	14.7 (58.5)	18.6 (65.5)	21.7 (71.1)	23.9 (75.0)	23.7 (74.7)	19.4 (66.9)	14.0 (57.2)	8.5 (47.3)	5.3 (41.5)	14.1 (57.4)
Daily mean °C (°F)	2.1 (35.8)	2.6 (36.7)	5.3 (41.5)	9.5 (49.1)	13.5 (56.3)	16.6 (61.9)	18.7 (65.7)	18.4 (65.1)	14.5 (58.1)	10.2 (50.4)	6.0 (42.8)	3.0 (37.4)	10.0 (50.0)
Mean daily minimum °C (°F)	−0.5 (31.1)	−0.5 (31.1)	1.3 (34.3)	4.2 (39.6)	7.8 (46.0)	11.1 (52.0)	13.3 (55.9)	13.1 (55.6)	9.9 (49.8)	6.5 (43.7)	3.2 (37.8)	0.5 (32.9)	5.8 (42.4)
Mean minimum °C (°F)	−9.9 (14.2)	−8.4 (16.9)	−5.1 (22.8)	−2.8 (27.0)	1.3 (34.3)	5.7 (42.3)	8.5 (47.3)	7.8 (46.0)	3.9 (39.0)	−0.7 (30.7)	−3.7 (25.3)	−8.0 (17.6)	−12.4 (9.7)
Record low °C (°F)	−24.8 (−12.6)	−24.3 (−11.7)	−18.3 (−0.9)	−7.4 (18.7)	−3.2 (26.2)	0.3 (32.5)	3.3 (37.9)	3.3 (37.9)	−1.3 (29.7)	−7.9 (17.8)	−17.1 (1.2)	−20.9 (−5.6)	−24.8 (−12.6)
Average precipitation mm (inches)	52.6 (2.07)	40.5 (1.59)	44.8 (1.76)	35.5 (1.40)	52.0 (2.05)	52.7 (2.07)	68.2 (2.69)	65.3 (2.57)	52.1 (2.05)	56.7 (2.23)	51.6 (2.03)	54.6 (2.15)	626.7 (24.67)
Average extreme snow depth cm (inches)	4.6 (1.8)	3.4 (1.3)	1.7 (0.7)	0.1 (0.0)	0 (0)	0 (0)	0 (0)	0 (0)	0 (0)	0 (0)	0.7 (0.3)	4.3 (1.7)	8.1 (3.2)
Average precipitation days (≥ 1.0 mm)	17.4	15.5	15.4	12.6	13.5	14.0	15.2	15.0	13.4	15.5	17.2	18.3	183
Average snowy days (≥ 1.0 cm)	5.5	4.9	1.8	0.1	0	0	0	0	0	0	0.8	3.6	16.7
Average relative humidity (%)	84.7	81.4	76.9	70.1	70.3	70.8	71.0	72.2	78.2	83.0	86.2	86.0	77.6
Mean monthly sunshine hours	47.4	68.4	117.2	177.1	212.1	211.1	213.5	198.5	151.6	106.2	51.8	39.3	1,596.9
Source 1: World Meteorological Organization
Source 2: DWD

=== Subdivisions ===
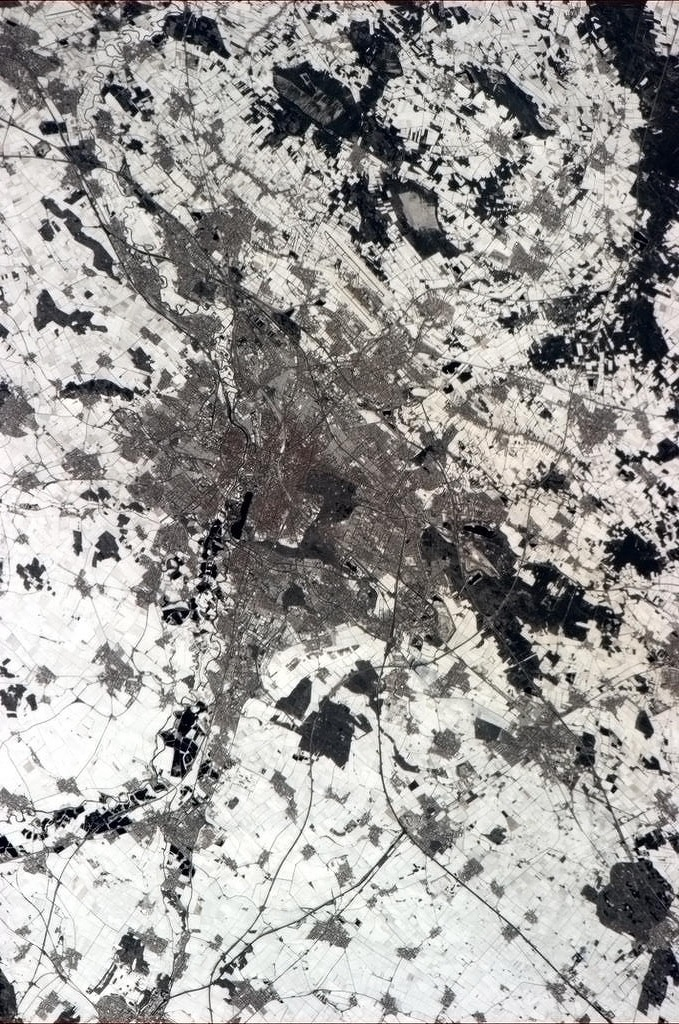
Hanover, as seen from the International Space Station

Boroughs of Hanover

Quarters of Hanover

Hanover in the Hanover Region

The city of Hanover is divided into 13 boroughs (Stadtbezirke) and 53 quarters (Stadtteile).

==== Boroughs ====
1. Mitte
2. Vahrenwald-List
3. Bothfeld-Vahrenheide
4. Buchholz-Kleefeld
5. Misburg-Anderten
6. Kirchrode-Bemerode-Wülferode
7. Südstadt-Bult
8. Döhren-Wülfel
9. Ricklingen
10. Linden-Limmer
11. Ahlem-Badenstedt-Davenstedt
12. Herrenhausen-Stöcken
13. Nord

==== Quarters ====
A selection of the 53 quarters:

- Nordstadt
- Südstadt
- Oststadt
- Zoo (for the zoo itself, see Hanover Zoo)
- Herrenhausen
- Waldheim

== Politics ==
=== Mayor ===
Results of the first round of the 2026 mayoral election

The current mayor of Hanover is Belit Onay of Alliance 90/The Greens, elected in 2019. The most recent mayoral election was held on 13 September 2026, with a runoff to be held on 27 September 2026, and the results were as follows:

Candidate	Party	First round		Second round	
Candidate	Party	Votes	%	Votes	%
Belit Onay	Alliance 90/The Greens	113,885	45.6		
Axel von der Ohe	Social Democratic Party	53,705	21.5		
Peter Karst	Christian Democratic Union	35,290	14.1		
Jessica Miriam Schülke	Alternative for Germany	26,910	10.8		
Maren Kaminski	The Left	11,634	4.7		
Thorsten Meyer	The Hanoverians	3,725	1.5		
Larissa Boch	Die PARTEI	1,829	0.7		
Muammer Duran	DAVA	1,479	0.6		
Bruno Adam Wolf	Pirate Party	1,101	0.4		
Valid votes		249,558	99.5		
Invalid votes		1,237	0.5		
Total		250,795	100.0		100.0
Electorate/voter turnout		396,360	63.3		

=== City council ===
Results of the 2026 city council election

The Hanover city council governs the city alongside the mayor. The most recent city council election was held on 13 September 2026, and the results were as follows:

Party	Votes	%	+/-	Seats	+/-
Alliance 90/The Greens (Grüne)	207,166	28.4	▲0.6	18	±0
Social Democratic Party (SPD)	167,649	23.0	▼4.7	15	▼3
Christian Democratic Union (CDU)	109,469	15.0	▼6.7	10	▼3
The Left (Die Linke)	87,154	12.0	▲6.4	8	▲4
Alternative for Germany (AfD)	80,161	11.0	▲6.7	7	▲4
Free Democratic Party (FDP)	23,987	3.3	▼2.7	2	▼2
Volt Germany (Volt)	15,367	2.1	▲0.4	1	±0
Sahra Wagenknecht Alliance (BSW)	11,908	1.6	New	1	New
The Hanoverians (HAN)	11,212	1.5	▲0.3	1	±0
Die PARTEI (PARTEI)	6,645	0.9	▼1.4	1	±0
Pirate Party (Piraten)	4,240	0.6	▼0.6	0	▼1
Alliance for Diversity and Awakening (DAVA)	2,935	0.4	New	0	New
Free Voters (FW)	507	0.1	▼0.4	0	±0
Daniel Schult (IND)	162	0.0	New	0	New
Alliance for Innovation and Justice (BIG)	131	0.0	New	0	New
Party of Humanists (PdH)	112	0.0	New	0	New
Total	728,805	100.0			
Valid votes	247,741	98.8			
Invalid votes	2,974	1.2			
Total	250,715	100.0		64	±0
Electorate/voter turnout	396,360	63.3	▲12.0		

== Main sights ==
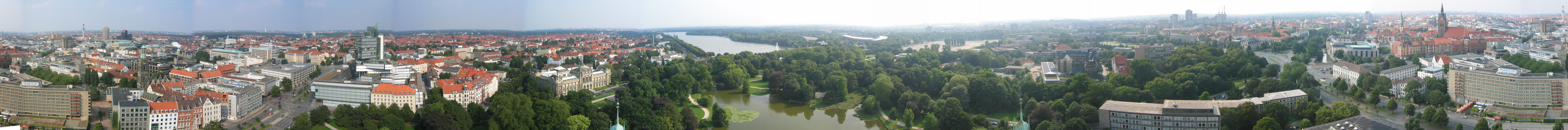
Panoramic view from the viewing platform of the New Town Hall

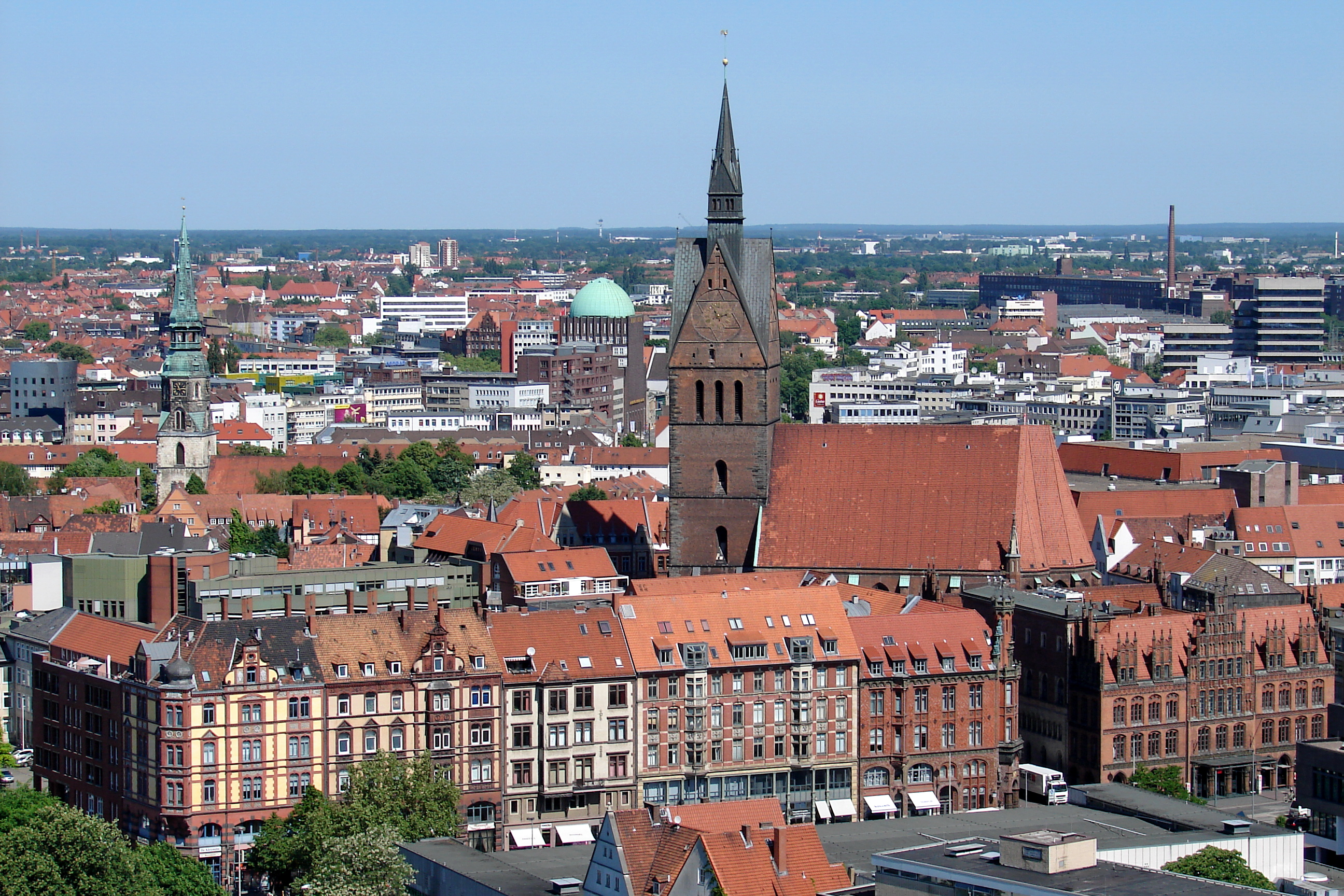
Market Church in Hanover

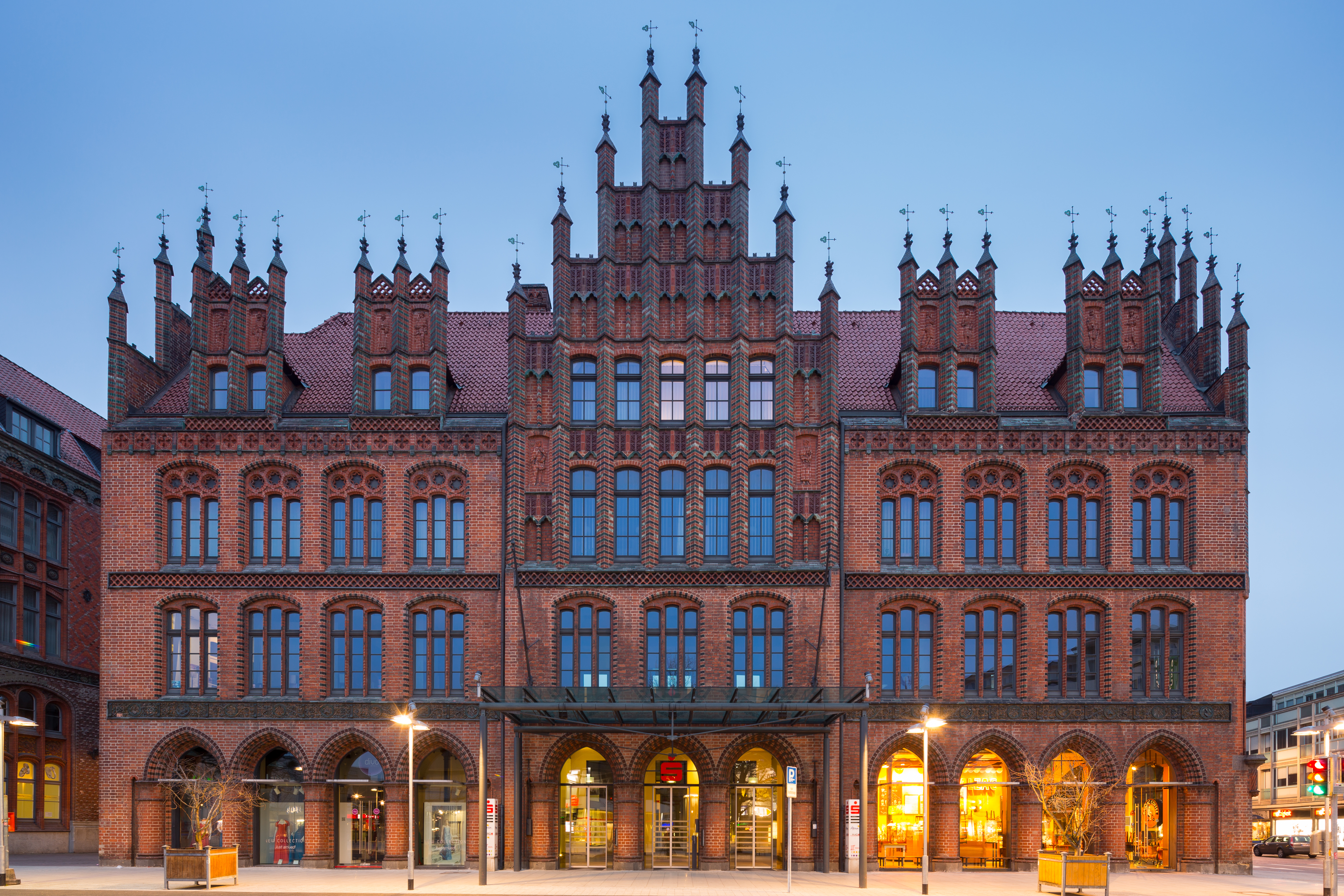
Old Town Hall

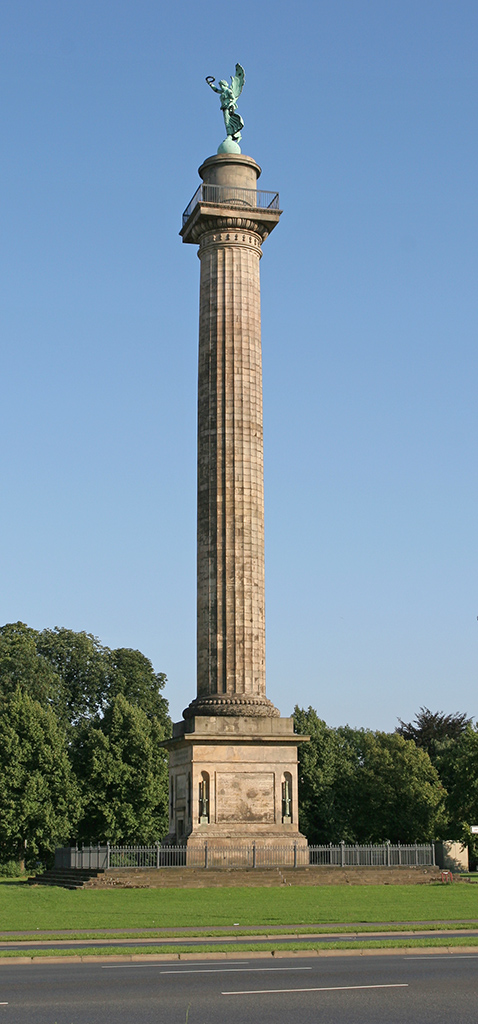
Waterloo Column in Hanover

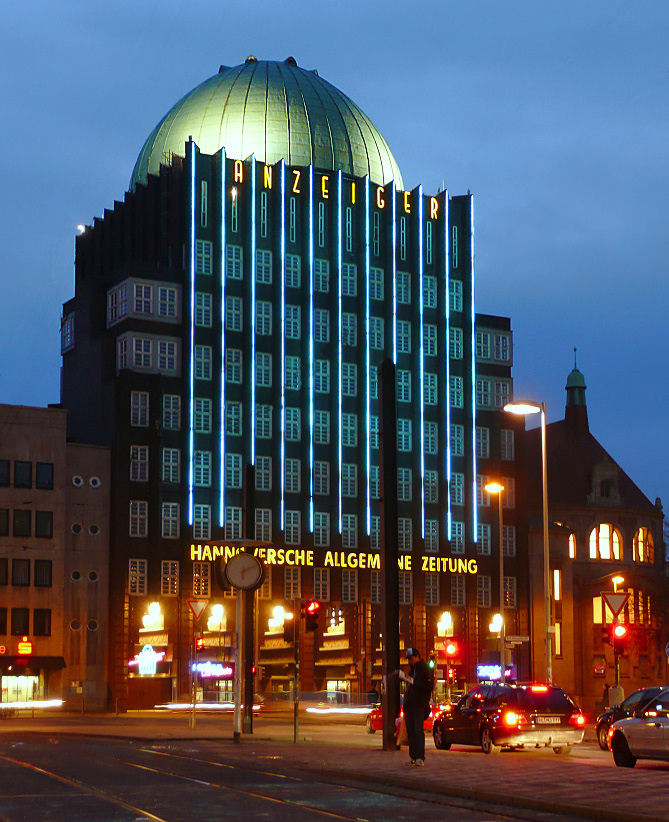
Anzeiger Tower Block

There are around 5,500 buildings of major historic value within city limits. One of Hanover's most grandiose sights is the Royal Gardens of Herrenhausen. Its Great Garden is an important European Baroque garden. The palace itself was largely destroyed by Allied bombing, but was reconstructed and reopened in 2013. Among its points of interest is the Grotto, with the interior designed by French artist Niki de Saint Phalle. The Great Garden consists of several parts and features Europe's tallest garden fountain. The historic Garden Theatre has hosted the musicals of the German rock musician Heinz Rudolf Kunze.

Also at Herrenhausen, the Berggarten is a botanical garden with the most varied collection of orchids in Europe. Some points of interest are the Tropical House, the Cactus House, the Canary House and the Orchid House, and free-flying birds and butterflies. Near the entrance to the Berggarten is the historic Library Pavillon. The Mausoleum of the Guelphs is also in the Berggarten. Like the Great Garden, the Berggarten also consists of several parts, for example the Paradies and the Prairie Garden. The Georgengarten is an English landscape garden. The Leibniz Temple and the Georgen Palace are two points of interest there.

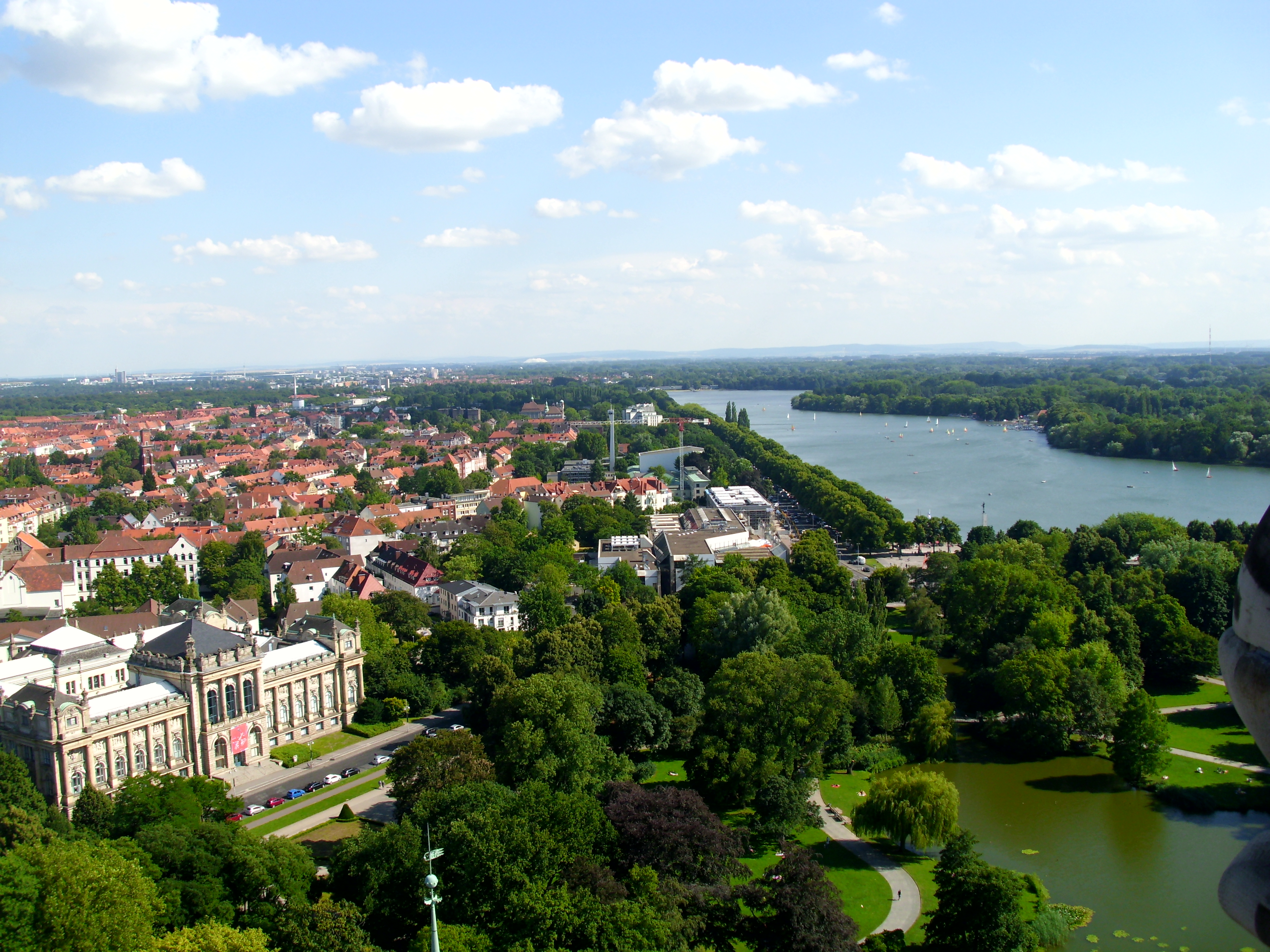
Maschsee seen from the viewing platform of the New Town Hall

The landmark of Hanover is the New Town Hall (Neues Rathaus). Inside the building are four scale models of the city. An elevator ascends to the observation deck at the top of the large dome along a variable angle of up to 17 degrees, thought to be unique in the world.

The Hanover Zoo received the Park Scout Award for the fourth year running in 2009–10, placing it among the best zoos in Germany. The zoo consists of several theme areas: Sambesi, Meyers Farm, Gorilla-Mountain, Jungle-Palace, and Mullewapp. Some smaller areas are Australia, the wooded area for wolves, and the so-called swimming area with many seabirds. There is also a tropical house, a jungle house, and a show arena. The new Canadian-themed area, Yukon Bay, opened in 2010. In 2010 the Hanover Zoo had over 1.6 million visitors. There is also the Sea Life Centre Hanover, which is the first tropical aquarium in Germany.

Another point of interest is the Old Town. In the centre are the large Marktkirche (Church St. Georgii et Jacobi, preaching venue of the bishop of the Lutheran Landeskirche Hanovers), and the 15th century Old Town Hall, heavily damaged by Allied bombing in 1943, and reconstructed after World War II. Nearby are the Leibniz House, the Nolte House, and the Beguine Tower. The Kreuz-Church-Quarter around the Kreuz Church contains many little lanes. Nearby is the old royal sports hall, now called the Ballhof theatre. On the edge of the Old Town are the Market Hall, the Leine Palace, and the ruin of the Aegidien Church which is now a monument to the victims of war and violence. Through the Marstall Gate the bank of the river Leine can be reached; the Nanas of Niki de Saint Phalle are there. They are part of the Sculpture Mile, which starts at Trammplatz, runs along the river bank, crosses Königsworther Square, and ends at the entrance of the Georgengarten. Near the Old Town is the district of Calenberger Neustadt where the Catholic St. Clement's Basilica, the Reformed Church and the Lutheran Neustädter Hof- und Stadtkirche St. Johannis stand.

Some other popular sights are the Waterloo Column, the Laves House, the Wangenheim Palace, the Lower Saxony State Archives, the Hanover Playhouse, the Kröpcke Clock, the Anzeiger Tower Block, the Administration Building of the NORD/LB, the Cupola Hall of the Congress Centre, the Lower Saxony Stock, the Ministry of Finance, the Garten Church, the Luther Church, the Gehry Tower (designed by the American architect Frank O. Gehry), the specially designed Bus Stops, the Opera House, the Hanover Central Station, the Maschsee lake and the city forest Eilenriede, which is one of the largest of its kind in Europe. For recreation, Hanover has 40 parks, forests and gardens, a couple of lakes, two rivers and a canal.

The historic Leibniz Letters, which can be viewed in the Gottfried Wilhelm Leibniz Library, have been on UNESCO's Memory of the World Register since 2007.

Outside the city centre is the Hanover Fairground, which was the site of EXPO 2000 fair. Some points of interest are the Planet M., the former German Pavillon, some nations' vacant pavilions, the Expowale, the EXPO-Plaza and the EXPO-Gardens (Parc Agricole, EXPO-Park South and the Gardens of change). The fairground can be reached by the Exponale, one of the largest pedestrian bridges in Europe.

The Hanover Fairground is the largest exhibition centre in the world. It provides 496,000 square metres (5.34 million square feet) of covered indoor space, 58,000 square metres (620 thousand square feet) of open-air space, 27 halls and pavilions. Many of the Exhibition Centre's halls are architectural highlights. Furthermore, it offers the Convention Center with its 35 function rooms, glassed-in areas between halls, grassy park-like recreation zones and its own heliport. Two important sights on the fairground are the Hermes Tower (88.8 metres or 291 feet high) and the EXPO Roof, the largest wooden roof in the world.

In the district of Anderten is the European Cheese Centre, termed a "Cheese Experience Centre." Another tourist sight in Anderten is the Hindenburg Lock, which was the biggest lock in Europe when it was constructed in 1928. The Tiergarten in the district of Kirchrode is a forest originally used for deer and other game for the king's table.

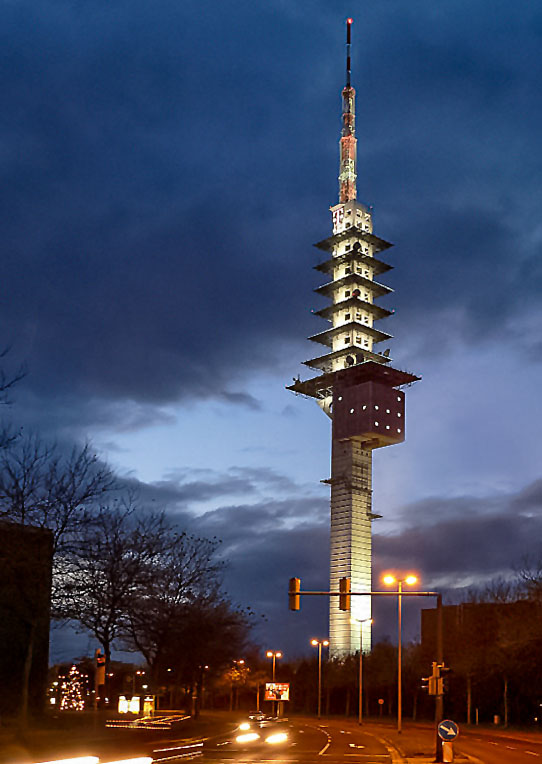
The Telemax tower is visible from up to 30 kilometres (19 mi) away on the Autobahns

The 282-metre-high (925 ft) Telemax communications tower, the tallest building in Lower Saxony and the highest television tower in northern Germany, lies in the district of Groß-Buchholz. Some other notable towers are the VW-Tower in the city centre and the old towers of the former middle-age defence belt: Döhrener Tower, Lister Tower and the Horse Tower.

The 36 most significant sights of the city centre are connected by a 4.2-kilometre-long (3 mi) walking trail called the Red Thread that is literally painted onto the pavement with red paint. It starts at the Tourist Information Office and ends on the Ernst-August-Square, both in front of the central train station. There is also a guided sightseeing bus tour through the city.

== Population ==
Historical population
Year	Pop.	±%
1190	1,500	—
1435	5,000	+233.3%
1811	16,816	+236.3%
1836	23,898	+42.1%
1855	33,148	+38.7%
1875	106,667	+221.8%
1895	209,535	+96.4%
1905	250,632	+19.6%
1919	321,200	+28.2%
1939	477,100	+48.5%
1945	325,841	−31.7%
1951	469,300	+44.0%
1961	574,481	+22.4%
1970	522,098	−9.1%
1980	534,623	+2.4%
1990	513,010	−4.0%
2001	516,415	+0.7%
2011	506,416	−1.9%
2022	513,291	+1.4%
Population size may be affected by changes in administrative divisions.

Population development of Hanover, Germany, from 1871 with gender breakdown since 31 December 1968

Hanover has a population of about 540,000. It is the largest city in Lower Saxony and is the 13th largest city in Germany. The Hanover Region, a district that surrounds the city of Hanover and cities like Langenhagen, Garbsen and Laatzen has a population of about 1,160,000 and is the largest District (Landkreis) in Germany. Hanover metropolitan region, which includes also cities like Braunschweig, Hildesheim and Göttingen, has a population of about 3,850,000 and is the 8th largest metropolitan area in Germany. Hanover passed a population of 100,000 in 1875, and Hanover's population has grown since 1946, when Hanover became the capital of Lower Saxony state and it grew rapidly in 1950s and 60s due to West German Wirtschaftswunder. This also saw the growth of a large migrant population, drawn largely from Turkey, Greece and Italy. Hanover has also one of the largest Vietnamese communities in former West Germany due to its proximity to former East Germany. The Viên Giác pagoda in Mittelfeld, southern district of Hanover is the largest Vietnamese pagoda in Germany and one of the largest in Europe. Hanover is one of the liveable cities due to its good location and good population size.

It is the fifth-largest city in the Low German dialect area after Hamburg, Dortmund, Essen and Bremen.

Largest groups of foreign residents
Nationality	Population (31 December 2022)
Turkey	15,600
Poland	8,200
Ukraine	7,300
Syria	6,000
Greece	5,400
Iraq	4,900
Bulgaria	4,300
Italy	3,700
Romania	3,400
Russia	3,000
Spain	2,800
Vietnam	2,750
Serbia	2,700
Iran	2,500
Croatia	2,350
Ghana	2,150
Afghanistan	2,000
Kosovo	1,900
India	1,850
China	1,400
Bosnia and Herzegovina	1,200

== Society and culture ==
=== Religious life ===
Hanover is headquarters for several Protestant organizations, including the World Communion of Reformed Churches, the Protestant Church in Germany, the Reformed Alliance, the United Evangelical Lutheran Church of Germany, and the Independent Evangelical-Lutheran Church.

In 2015, 31.1% of the population were Protestant and 13.4% were Roman Catholic. The majority 55.5% were irreligious or other religion.

=== Museums and galleries ===
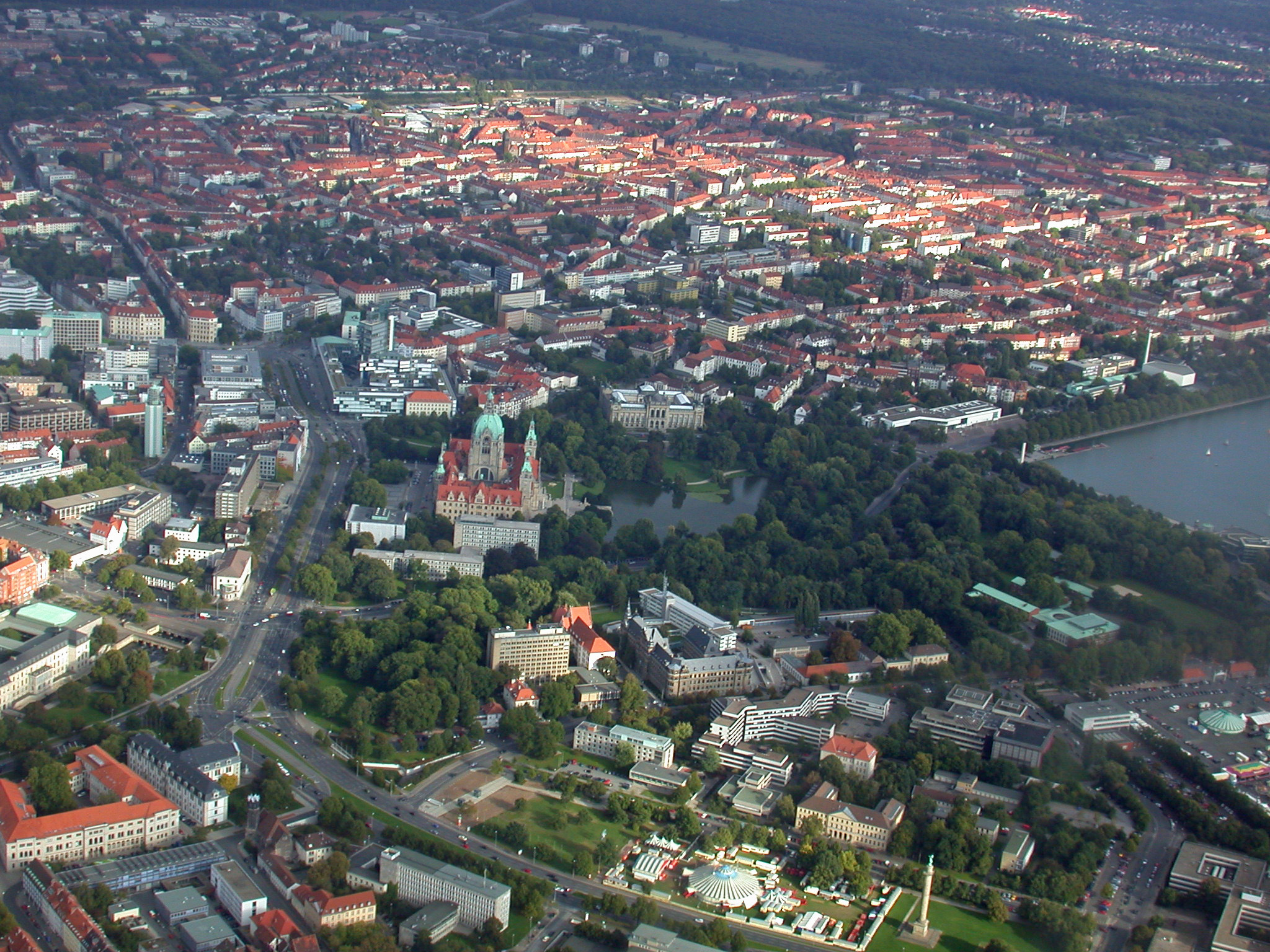
Hanover from the sky

The Historisches Museum Hanover (Historic museum) describes the history of Hanover, from the medieval settlement "Honovere" to the city of today. The museum focuses on the period from 1714 to 1834 when Hanover had a strong relationship with the British royal family of that period.

With more than 4,000 members, the Kestnergesellschaft is the largest art society in Germany. The museum hosts exhibitions from classical modernist art to contemporary art. Emphasis is placed on film, video, contemporary music and architecture, room installments and presentations of contemporary paintings, sculptures and video art.

The Kestner-Museum is located in the House of 5,000 windows. The museum is named after August Kestner and exhibits 6,000 years of applied art in four areas: Ancient cultures, ancient Egypt, applied art and a valuable collection of historic coins.

The KUBUS is a forum for contemporary art. It features mostly exhibitions and projects of artists from Hanover.

The Kunstverein Hannover (Art Society Hanover) shows contemporary art and was established in 1832 as one of the first art societies in Germany. It is located in the Künstlerhaus (House of artists). There are around seven international exhibitions each year.

The Landesmuseum Hanover is the largest museum in Hanover. The art gallery shows European art from the 11th to the 20th century, the nature department shows the zoology, geology, botanic, geology and a vivarium with fish, insects, reptiles and amphibians. The primeval department shows the primeval history of Lower Saxony, and the folklore department shows cultures from all over the world.

The Sprengel Museum shows the art of the 20th century. It is one of the most notable art museums in Germany. The focus is put on the classical modernist art with the collection of Kurt Schwitters, works of German expressionism, and French cubism, the cabinet of abstracts, the graphics and the department of photography and media. Furthermore, the museum shows the works of the French artist Niki de Saint-Phalle.

The Theatre Museum shows an exhibition of the history of the theatre in Hanover from the 17th century up to now: opera, concert, drama and ballet. The museum also hosts several touring exhibitions during the year.

The Wilhelm Busch Museum is the German Museum of Caricature and Critical Graphic Arts. The collection of the works of Wilhelm Busch and the extensive collection of cartoons and critical graphics is unique in Germany. Furthermore, the museum hosts several exhibitions of national and international artists during the year.

A cabinet of coins is the Münzkabinett der TUI-AG. The Polizeigeschichtliche Sammlung Niedersachsen is the largest police museum in Germany. Textiles from all over the world can be visited in the Museum for textile art. The EXPOseeum is the museum of the world-exhibition "EXPO 2000 Hanover". Carpets and objects from the orient can be visited in the Oriental Carpet Museum. The Museum for the visually impaired is a rarity in Germany, there is only one other of its kind in Berlin. The Museum of veterinary medicine is unique in Germany. The Museum for Energy History describes the 150 years old history of the application of energy. The Heimat-Museum Ahlem shows the history of the district of Ahlem. The Mahn- und Gedenkstätte Ahlem describes the history of the Jewish people in Hanover and the Stiftung Ahlers Pro Arte / Kestner Pro Arte shows modern art. Modern art is also the main topic of the Kunsthalle Faust, the Nord/LB Art Gallery and of the Foro Artistico / Eisfabrik.

Some leading art events in Hanover are the Long Night of the Museums and the Zinnober Kunstvolkslauf which features all the galleries in Hanover.

People who are interested in astronomy should visit the Observatory Geschwister Herschel on the Lindener Mountain or the small planetarium inside of the Bismarck School.

=== Theatre, cabaret and musical ===
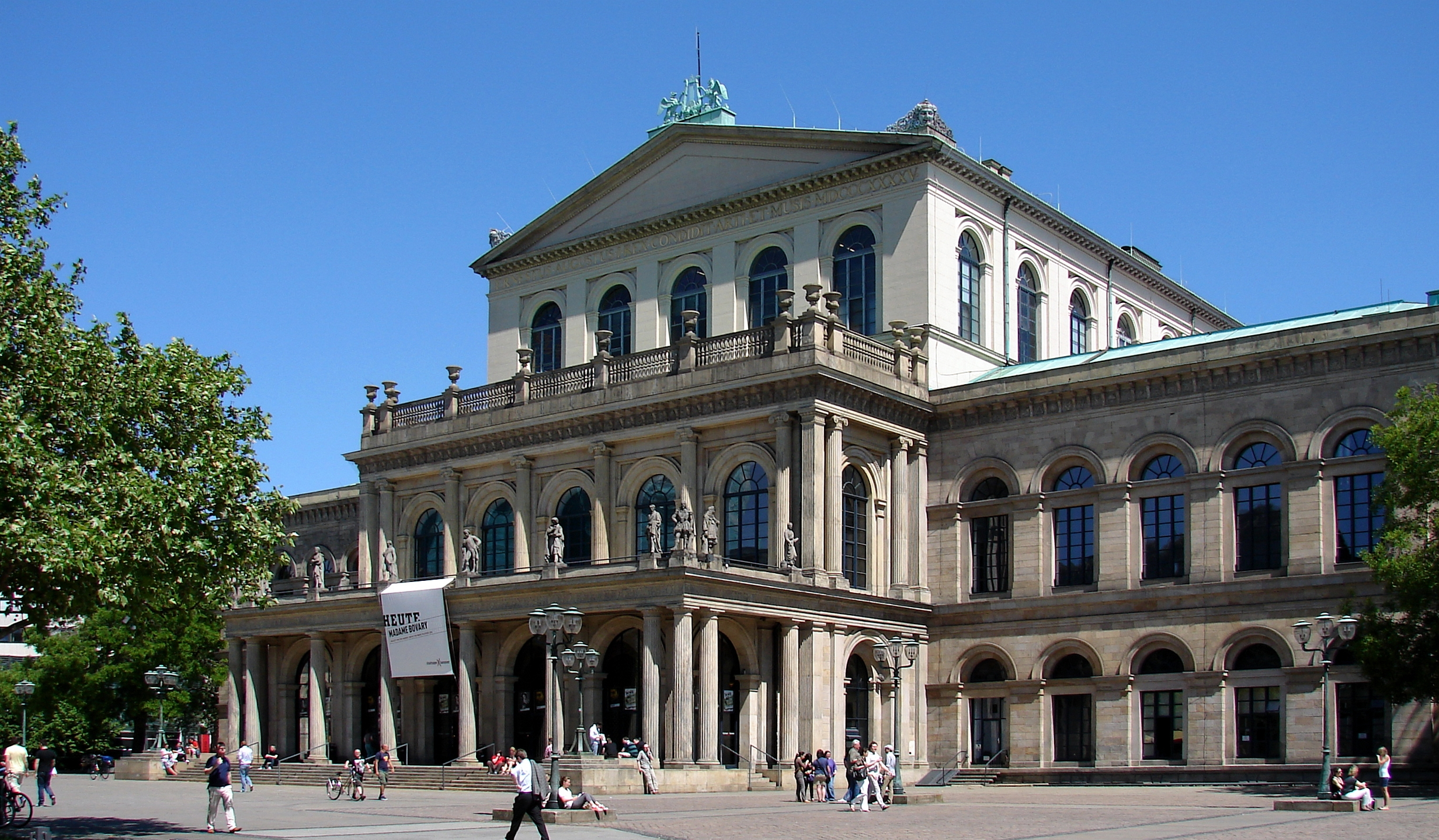
Hanover State Opera is resident in the classical 19th-century Hanover Opera House.

Around 40 theatres are located in Hanover. The Opera House, the Schauspielhaus (Play House), the Ballhof eins, the Ballhof zwei and the Cumberlandsche Galerie belong to the Lower Saxony State Theatre. The Theater am Aegi is Hanover's principal theatre for musicals, shows and guest performances. The Neues Theater (New Theatre) is the boulevard theatre of Hanover. The Theater für Niedersachsen is another large theatre in Hanover, which also has an own musical company. Some of the most important musical productions are the rock musicals of the German rock musician Heinz Rudolph Kunze, which take place at the Garden-Theatre in the Great Garden.

Some important theatre events are the Tanztheater International, the Long Night of the Theatres, the Festival Theaterformen and the International Competition for Choreographers.

Hanover's leading cabaret stage is the GOP Variety theatre which is located in the Georgs Palace. Some other cabaret-stages are the Variety Marlene, the Uhu-Theatre. the theatre Die Hinterbühne, the Rampenlich Variety and the revue-stage TAK. The most important cabaret event is the Kleines Fest im Großen Garten (Little Festival in the Great Garden) which is the most successful cabaret festival in Germany. It features artists from around the world. Some other important events are the Calenberger Cabaret Weeks, the Hanover Cabaret Festival and the Wintervariety.

=== Music ===
==== Classical music ====
Hanover has two symphony orchestras: The Lower Saxon State Orchestra Hanover and the NDR Radiophilharmonie (North German Radio Philharmonic Orchestra). Two notable choirs have their homes in Hanover: the Mädchenchor Hanover (girls' choir) and the Knabenchor Hanover (boys' choir).

There are two major international competitions for classical music in Hanover:

- Hanover International Violin Competition (since 1991)
- Classica Nova International Music Competition (since 1997); the non-profit association Classica Nova exists in Hanover with the aim of continuing the Classica Nova competition

==== Popular music ====
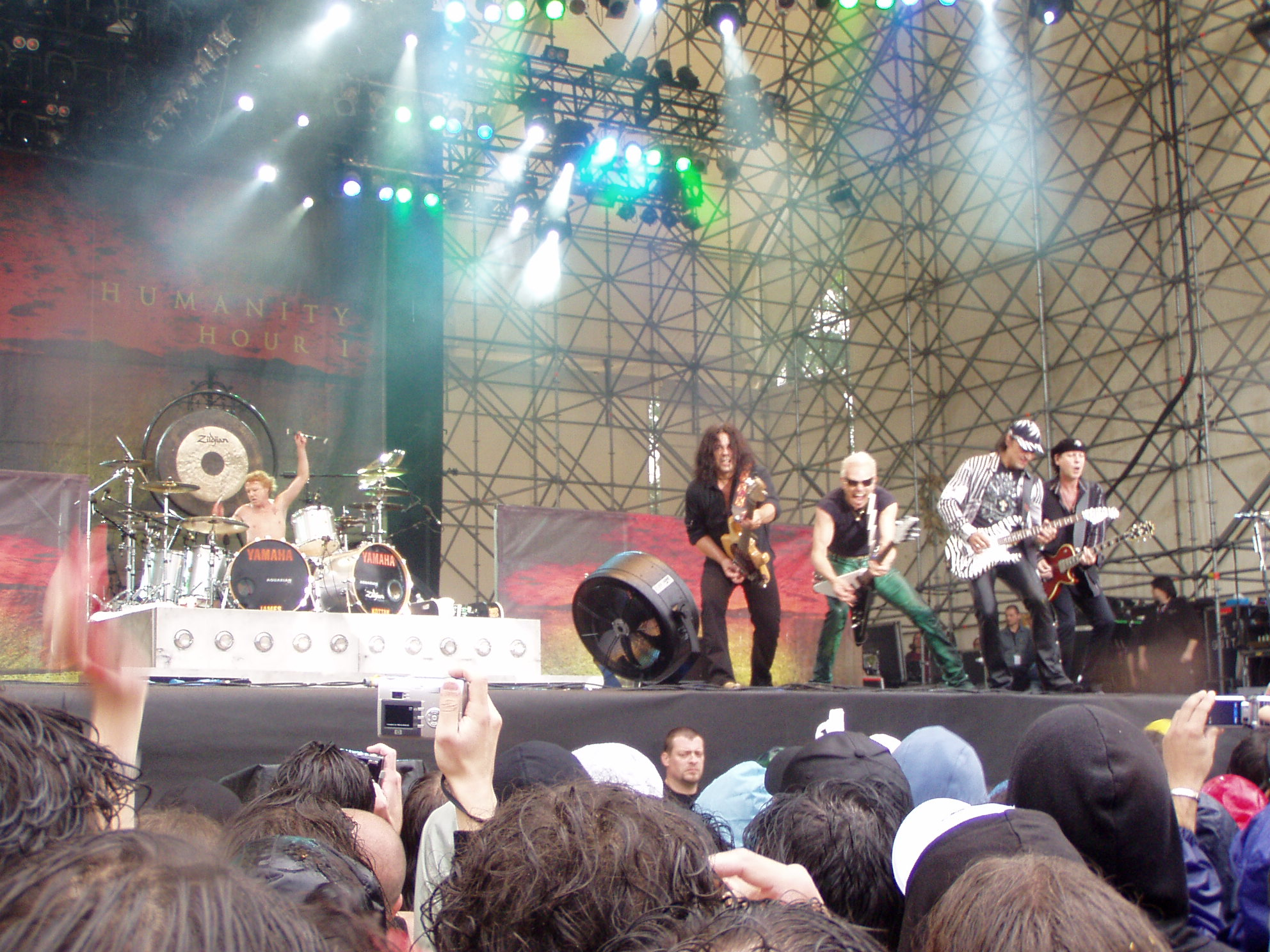
Hanover band, Scorpions

The rock bands Scorpions and Fury in the Slaughterhouse are originally from Hanover. Acclaimed DJ Mousse T also has his main recording studio in the area. Rick J. Jordan, member of the band Scooter was born here in 1968. Lena, winner of the 2010 Eurovision Song Contest, is also from Hanover.

=== Sport ===
Hanover 96 (nicknamed Die Roten, literally 'the Reds') is the top local football team that currently plays in the 2. Bundesliga. Home games are played at the Niedersachsenstadion (Lower Saxony Stadium), which hosted matches in the 1974 and 2006 World Cups and the Euro 1988. Their reserve team Hanover 96 II plays in the 3rd division of German Football. Their home games were played in the traditional Eilenriedestadion until they moved to the HDI Arena due to DFL directives. Arminia Hanover is another traditional football team in Hanover that has played in the second division (then 2. Liga Nord) for years and plays now in the Niedersachsen-West Liga (Lower Saxony League West). Home matches are played in the Rudolf-Kalweit-Stadium.

The Hanover Indians are the local ice hockey team. They play in the third tier. Their home games are played at the traditional Eisstadion am Pferdeturm. The Hanover Scorpions played in Hanover in Germany's top league until 2013 when they sold their license and moved to Langenhagen.

Hanover was one of the rugby union capitals in Germany. The first German rugby team was founded in Hanover in 1878. Hanover-based teams dominated the German rugby scene for a long time. DSV 78 Hanover, SC Germania List, and SV Odin Hanover plays in the first division, and DRC Hanover as well as SG 78/08 Hanover play in the second division.

Hanover has traditionally been one of Germany's hubs in Water sports and especially in Water polo. The SG Waspo'98 Hanover won the Deutsche Wasserball-Liga in 2020 and 2021. In total, clubs from Hanover have won the German championship 11 times. Thanks to the Maschsee lake, the rivers Ihme and Leine and to the Mittellandkanal canal, Hanover hosts sailing schools, yacht schools, waterski clubs, rowing clubs, canoe clubs and paddle clubs.

The first German fencing club was founded in Hanover in 1862. Today there are three additional fencing clubs in Hanover.

The Hanover Korbjäger are the city's top basketball team. They play their home games at the IGS Linden.

The Hanover Regents play in the third Bundesliga (baseball) division. The Hanover Grizzlies, Armina Spartans and Hanover Stampeders are the local American football teams.

The Hanover Marathon is the biggest running event in Hanover with more than 11,000 participants and usually around 200,000 spectators. Some other important running events are the Gilde Stadtstaffel (a relay event), the Sport-Check Nachtlauf (a night running event), the "Herrenhäuser Team-Challenge", the "Hannoversche Firmenlauf" (a company running event) and the Silvesterlauf (New Year's running event).

Hanover also hosts an important international cycle race, the "Nacht von Hannover" ("Night of Hanover"). The race takes place around the market hall.

The lake Maschsee hosts international dragon boat races and canoe olo tournaments. Many regattas take place during the year. "Head of the river Leine" on the river Leine is one of the biggest rowing regattas in Hanover. One of Germany's most successful dragon boat teams, the All Sports Team Hanover, which has won since its foundation in year 2000 more than 100 medals on national and international competitions, regularly trains on the local Maschsee lake.

Some other important sport events include the Lower Saxony beach volleyball tournament, the international horse show "German Classics" and the international ice hockey tournament Nations Cup.

=== Regular events ===
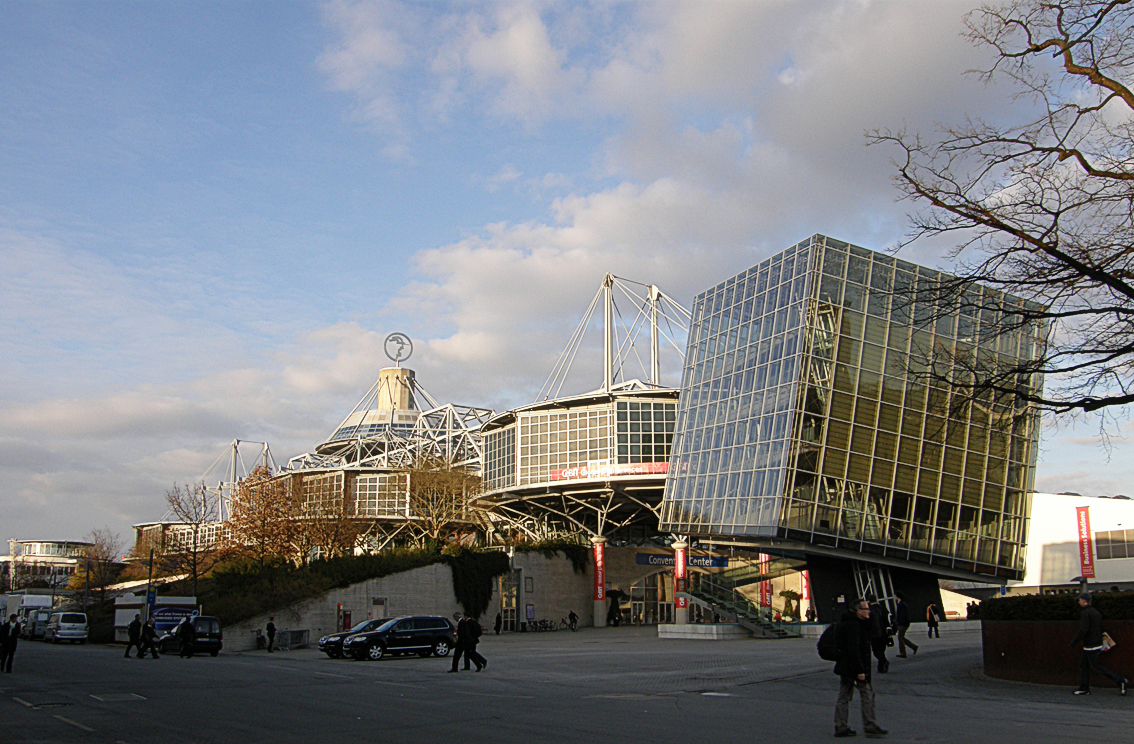
CeBIT 2008 conference centre in Hanover

Hanover is one of the leading exhibition cities in the world. It hosts more than 60 international and national exhibitions every year. The most popular ones are the CeBIT, the Hanover Fair, the Domotex, the Ligna, the IAA Nutzfahrzeuge and the Agritechnica. Hanover also hosts a huge number of congresses and symposiums like the International Symposium on Society and Resource Management.

Hanover is also host to the Schützenfest Hannover, the largest marksmen's fun fair in the world which takes place once a year from late June to early July. Founded in 1529, it consists of more than 260 rides and inns, five large beer tents and a large entertainment programme. The highlight of this fun fair is the 12-kilometre-long (7 mi) Parade of the Marksmen with more than 12,000 participants from all over the world, including around 5,000 marksmen, 128 bands, and more than 70 wagons, carriages, and other festival vehicles. This makes it the longest procession in Europe. Around 2 million people visit this fun fair every year. The landmark of this event is one of the largest transportable Ferris wheels in the world, with a height of about 60 metres (197 ft).

Hanover also hosts one of the two largest spring festivals in Europe, with around 180 rides and inns, 2 large beer tents, and around 1.5 million visitors each year. The Oktoberfest Hanover is the second largest Oktoberfest in the world with around 160 rides and inns, two large beer tents and around 1 million visitors each year.

The Maschsee Festival takes place around the Maschsee Lake. Each year around 2 million visitors come to enjoy live music, comedy, cabaret, and much more. It is the largest Volksfest of its kind in Northern Germany. The Great Garden hosts every year the International Fireworks Competition, and the International Festival Weeks Herrenhausen, with music and cabaret performances. The Carnival Procession is around 3 kilometres (2 mi) long and consists of 3,000 participants, around 30 festival vehicles and around 20 bands and takes place every year.

Other festivals include the Festival Feuer und Flamme (Fire and Flames), the Gartenfestival (Garden Festival), the Herbstfestival (Autumn Festival), the Harley Days, the Steintor Festival (Steintor is a party area in the city centre) and the Lister-Meile-Festival (Lister Meile is a large pedestrian area).

Hanover also hosts food-oriented festivals including the Wine Festival and the Gourmet Festival. It also hosts some special markets like the Old Town Flea Market and the Market for Art and Trade. Some other major markets include the Christmas Markets of the City of Hanover in the Old Town and city centre, and the Lister Meile.

=== Tourism ===
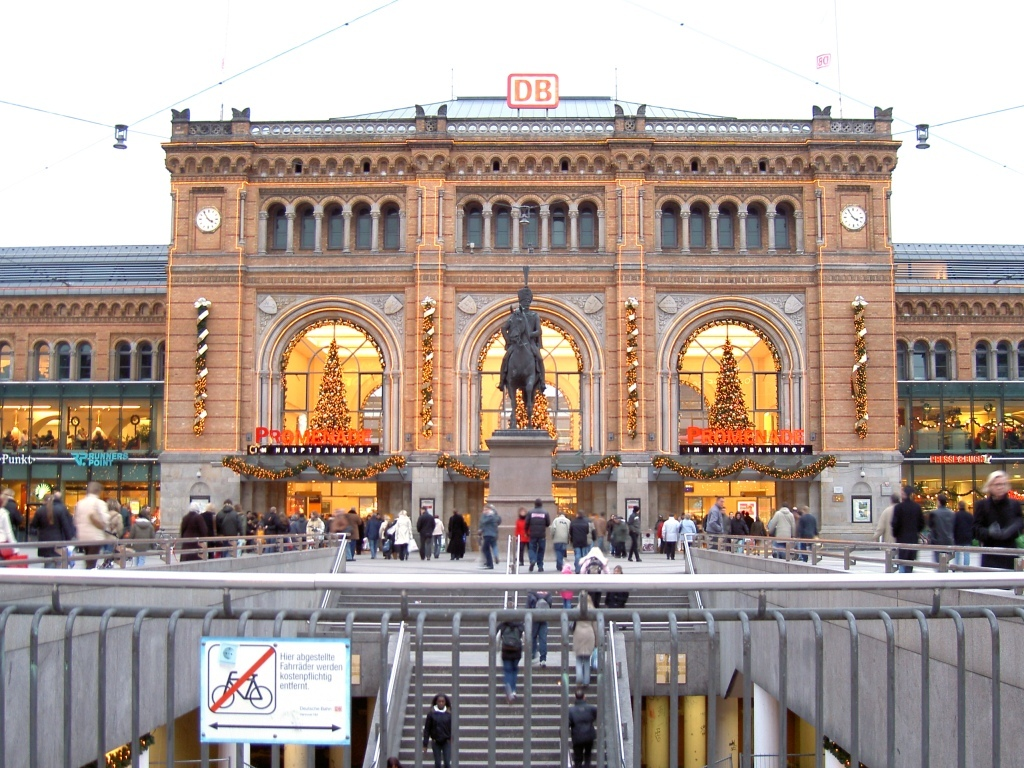
Ernst August memorial, central railway station

Hanover is an attractive tourist place due to its many sights and famous events. Hanover had about 580,000 visitors in 2021, predominantly from the Netherlands and the United Kingdom. Famous sights in Hanover are New Town Hall, Herrenhausen Gardens and Hanover Zoo, which is one of the largest zoos in Germany.

The annual trade fair "Hannover Messe" usually attracts between 100,000 and 200,000 visitors. First held in 1947, it is dedicated to the topic of industry development and is one of the world's largest trade fairs.

=== Media ===
Regional television and radio is provided by NDR which broadcast from Hamburg. However, the network has a studio located in the The State Radio House of Lower Saxony building which broadcast the local-opt of NDR Fernsehen Niedersachsen on TV and NDR 1 Niedersachsen on radio.

Local community based-radio stations are Radio 21 and Radio Hanover.

Local newspapers are served by Hannoversche Allgemeine Zeitung, Neue Presse, and Bild Hannover.

== Transport ==
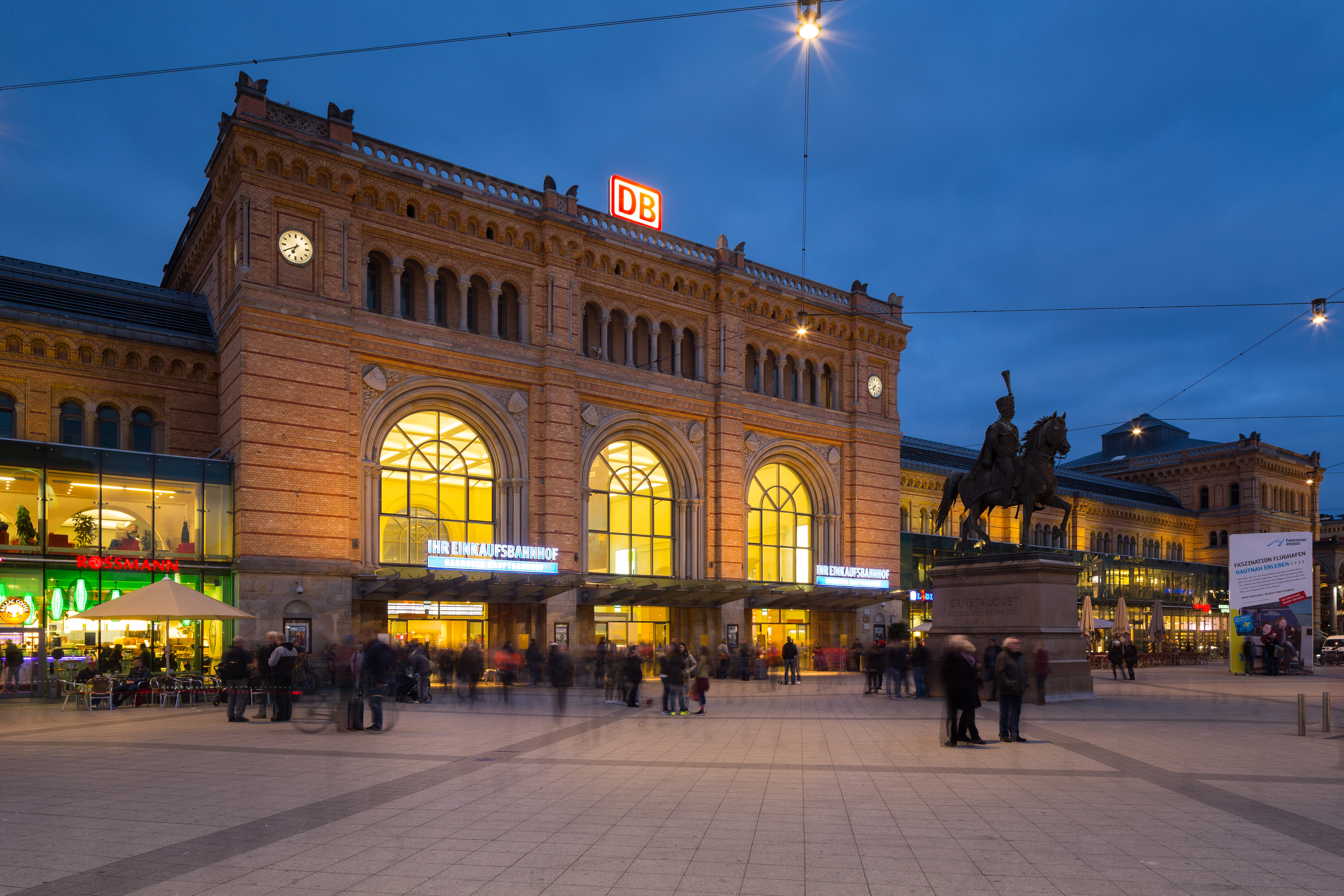
Hanover Central Station

Flixtrain in Hannover Hbf

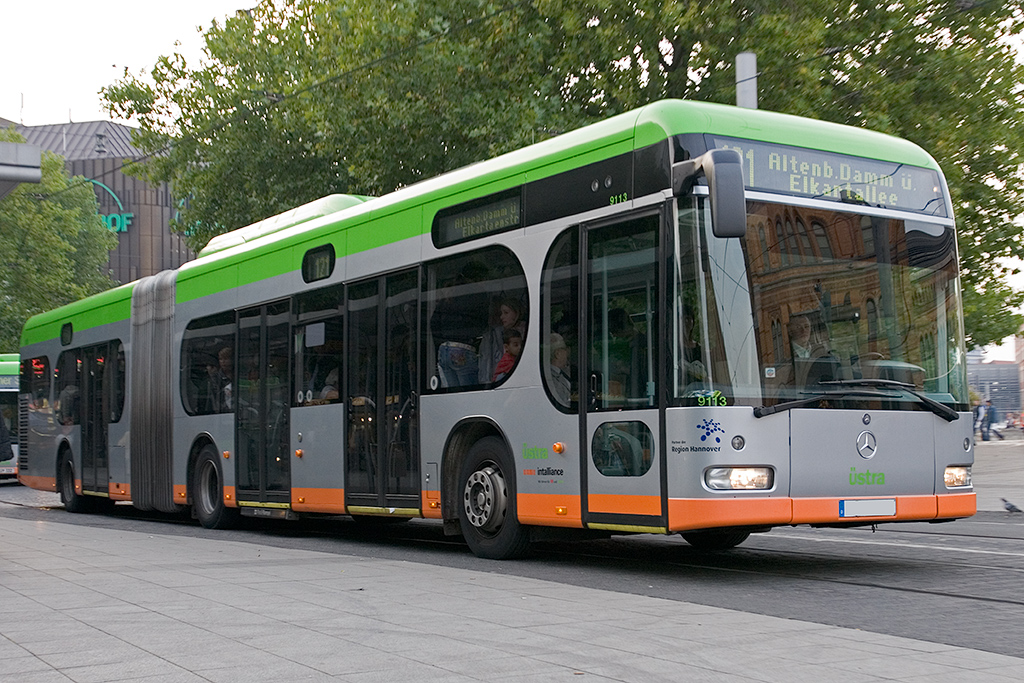
Citaro G natural gas bus designed by James Irvine

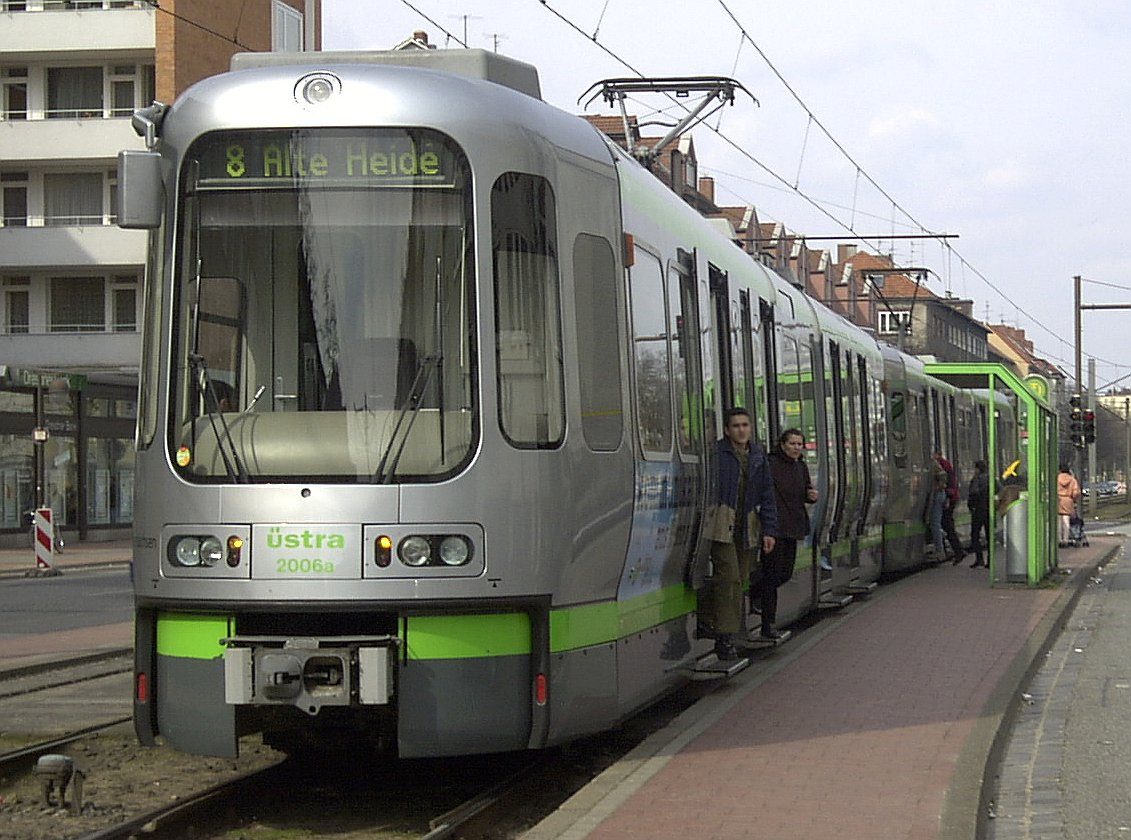
TW 2000 tram designed by Herbert Lindinger and Jasper Morrison

=== Rail ===
The city's central station, Hanover Hauptbahnhof, is a hub of the German high-speed ICE network. It is the starting point of the Hanover-Würzburg high-speed rail line and also the central hub for the Hanover S-Bahn. It offers many international and national connections.

=== Air ===
Hanover and its area is served by Hanover Airport (IATA code: HAJ; ICAO code: EDDV) in Langenhagen.

=== Road ===
Hanover is also an important hub of Germany's autobahn network; the junction of two major autobahns, the A 2 and A 7 is at Kreuz Hanover-Ost, at the northeastern edge of the city.

Local autobahns are A 352 (a shortcut between A 7 and A 2, also known as the Airport autobahn because it passes Hanover Airport), and the A 37.

The expressway (Schnellweg) system, a number of Bundesstraße roads, forms a structure loosely resembling a large ring road together with A 2 and A 7. The roads are B 3, B 6 and B 65, called Westschnellweg (B 6 on the northern part, B 3 on the southern part), Messeschnellweg (B 3, becomes A 37 near Burgdorf, crosses A 2, becomes B 3 again, changes to B 6 at Seelhorster Kreuz, then passes the Hanover fairground as B 6 and becomes A 37 again before merging into A 7) and Südschnellweg (starts out as B 65, becomes B 3/B 6/B 65 upon crossing Westschnellweg, then becomes B 65 again at Seelhorster Kreuz).

=== Bus and light rail ===
Hanover has an extensive Stadtbahn and bus system, operated by üstra. The city uses designer buses and tramways, the TW 6000 and TW 2000 trams being examples.

=== Bicycle ===
Bicycle paths are very common in the city centre. At off-peak hours bikes can be taken on a tram or bus.

== Economy ==
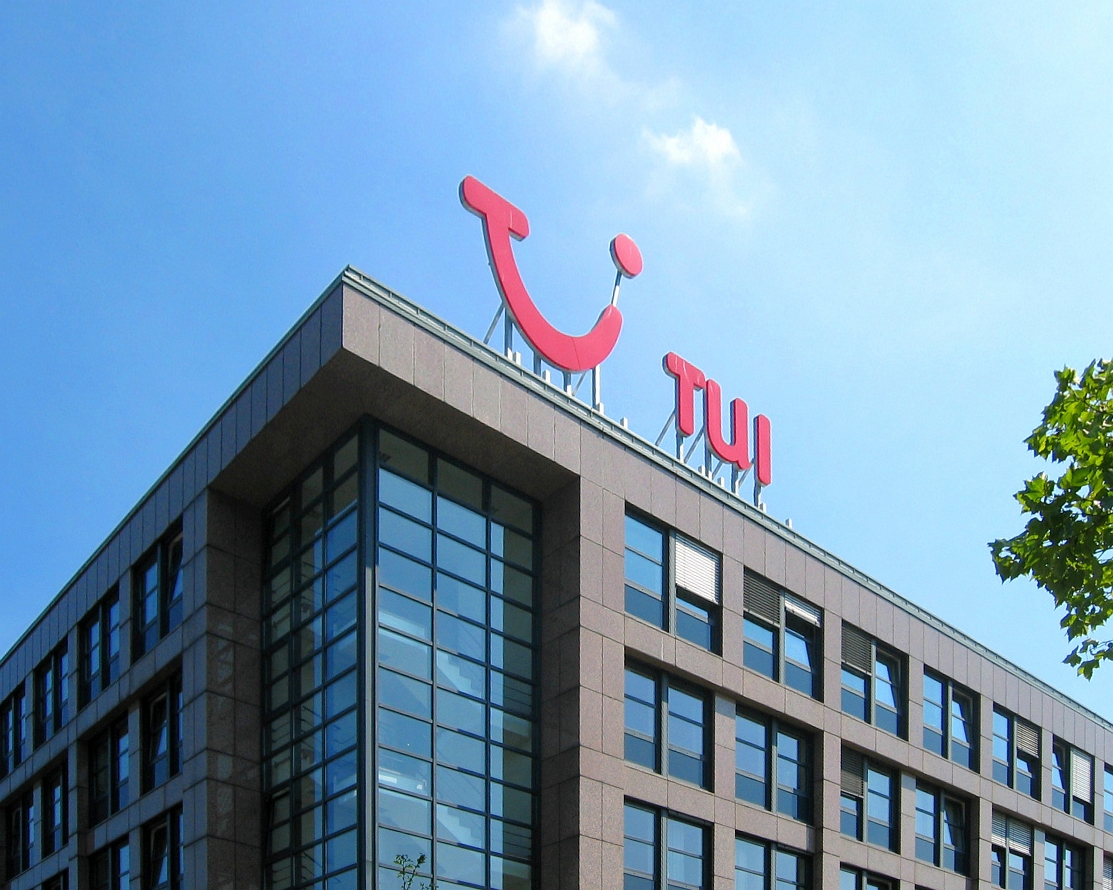
TUI AG headquarters in Hanover

Various industrial businesses are located in Hanover. The Volkswagen Commercial Vehicles Transporter (VWN) factory at Hanover-Stöcken is the biggest employer in the region and operates a large plant at the northern edge of town adjoining the canal Mittellandkanal and the autobahn A 2. Volkswagen shares a coal-burning power plant with a factory of German tire and automobile parts manufacturer Continental AG. Continental, founded in Hanover in 1871, is one of the city's major companies. Since 2008 a take-over has been in progress: the Schaeffler Group from Herzogenaurach (Bavaria) holds the majority of Continental's stock but were required due to the financial crisis to deposit the options as securities at banks.

The audio equipment company Sennheiser and the travel group TUI AG are both based in Hanover. Hanover is home to many insurance companies including Talanx, VHV Group, and Concordia Insurance. The major global reinsurance company Hannover Re also has its headquarters east of the city centre.

=== List of largest employers in Hanover ===
Employer	est.	Hanover located employees
Volkswagen Commercial Vehicles	1956	14,500
Klinikum Region Hannover	2005	8,500
Hannover Medical School	1961	7,600
Continental	1871	7,500
Deutsche Bahn	1994	6,000
TUI	2002	4,600
DHL	1969	4,400
Nord/LB	1970	4,000
Talanx	1996	4,000
WABCO	2007	2,600
VHV Group	2003	2,500

=== Key figures ===
In 2012, the city generated a GDP of €29.5 billion, which is equivalent to €74,822 per employee. The gross value of production in 2012 was €26.4 billion, which is equivalent to €66,822 per employee.

Around 300,000 employees were counted in 2014. Of these, 189,000 had their primary residence in Hanover, while 164,892 commute into the city every day.

In 2014 the city was home to 34,198 businesses, of which 9,342 were registered in the German Trade Register and 24,856 counted as small businesses. Hence, more than half of the metropolitan area's businesses in the German Trade Register are located in Hanover (17,485 total).

== Business development ==
Hannoverimpuls GMBH is a joint business development company from the city and region of Hanover. The company was founded in 2003 and supports the start-up, growth and relocation of businesses in the Hanover Region. The focus is on thirteen sectors, which stand for sustainable economic growth: Automotive, Energy Solutions, Information and Communications Technology, Life Sciences, Optical Technologies, Creative Industries and Production Engineering.

A range of programmes supports companies from the key industries in their expansion plans in Hanover or abroad. Three regional centres specifically promote international economic relations with Russia, India and Turkey.

The Institut für Integrierte Produktion Hannover is a spin-off from Leibniz University Hanover in the field of production technology that promotes transfer of scientific knowledge to business.

== Education ==
The Leibniz University Hanover is the largest funded institution in Hanover for providing higher education to students from around the world. Below are the names of the universities and some of the important schools, including newly opened Hannover Medical Research School in 2003 for attracting the students from biology background from around the world.

There are several universities in Hanover:

- Leibniz University Hannover, host institution to the Max Planck Institute for Gravitational Physics
- Hochschule für Musik, Theater und Medien Hannover
- Hannover Medical School
- School of Veterinary Medicine Hanover (Tierärztliche Hochschule Hannover)
- GISMA Business School, part of the for-profit education company Global University Systems.

There is one University of Applied Science and Arts in Hanover:

- Hochschule Hannover (the former Fachhochschule)

The Schulbiologiezentrum Hannover maintains practical biology schools in four locations (Botanischer Schulgarten Burg, Freiluftschule Burg, Zooschule Hannover, and Botanischer Schulgarten Linden). The University of Veterinary Medicine Hanover also maintains its own botanical garden specializing in medicinal and poisonous plants, the Heil- und Giftpflanzengarten der Tierärztlichen Hochschule Hannover.

Hannover has several vocational schools like Berufsbildende Schulen (BBS) ME - Metalltechnik und Elektrotechnik, which specializes in metal and electrical engineering, and BBS Cora Berliner, which specializes in business administration as well as the leisure and trading industries.

== In popular culture ==
- In the "Problem Dog" episode of American crime drama Breaking Bad, viewers learn that Madrigall Electromotive GmbH, the parent company of Los Pollos Hermanos, is located in Hanover.

== Notable people ==
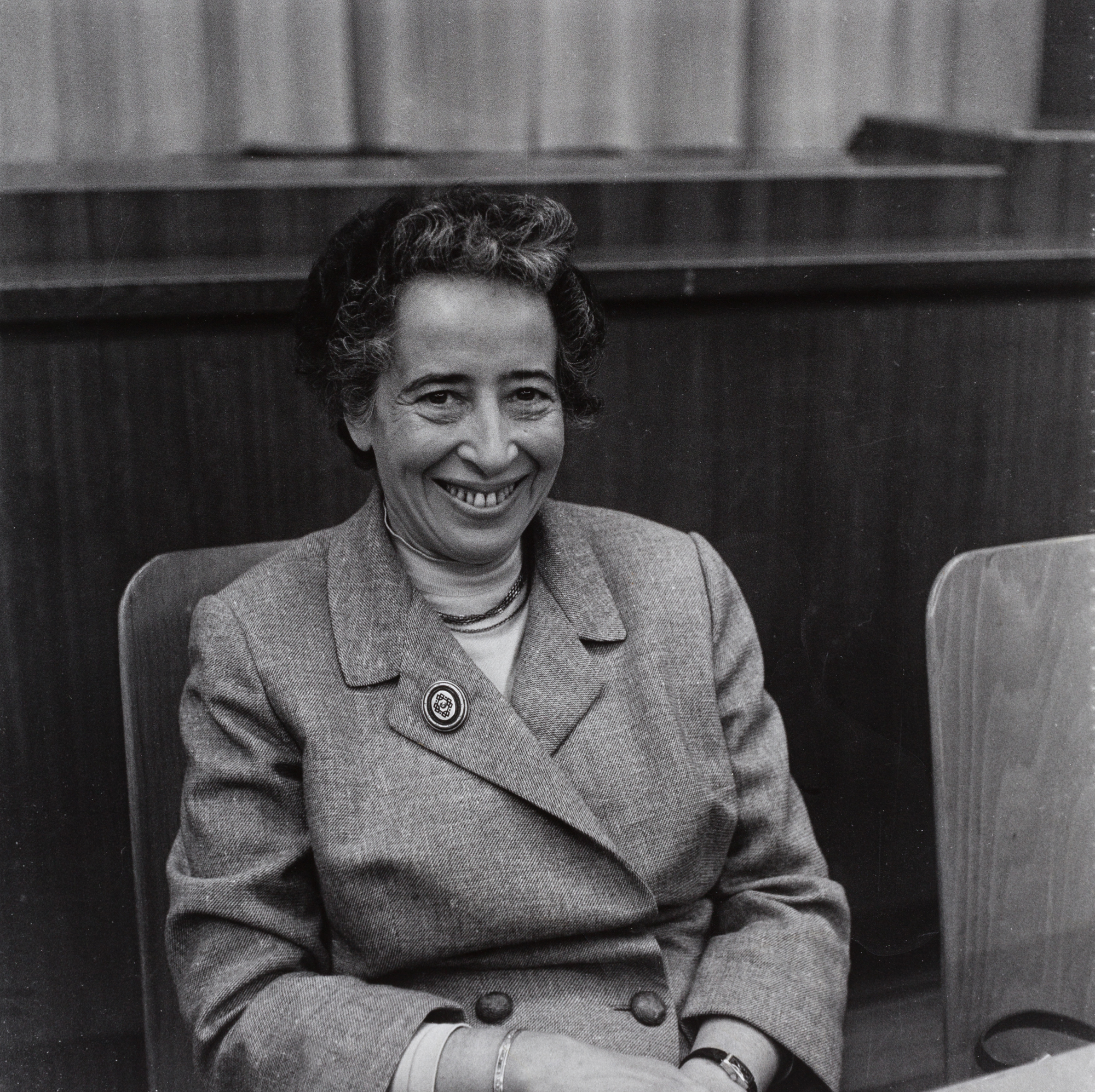
Hannah Arendt, 1958

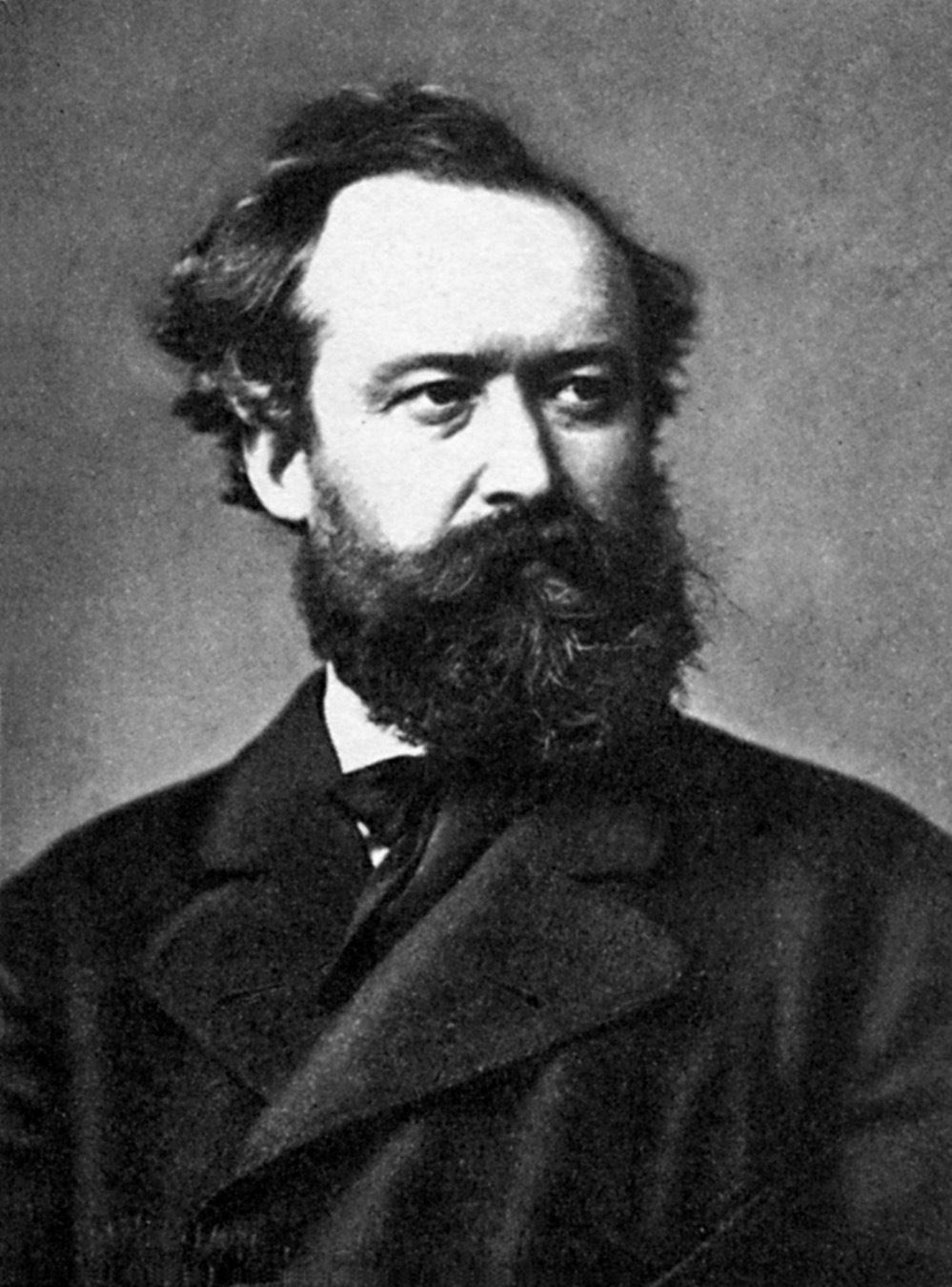
Wilhelm Busch

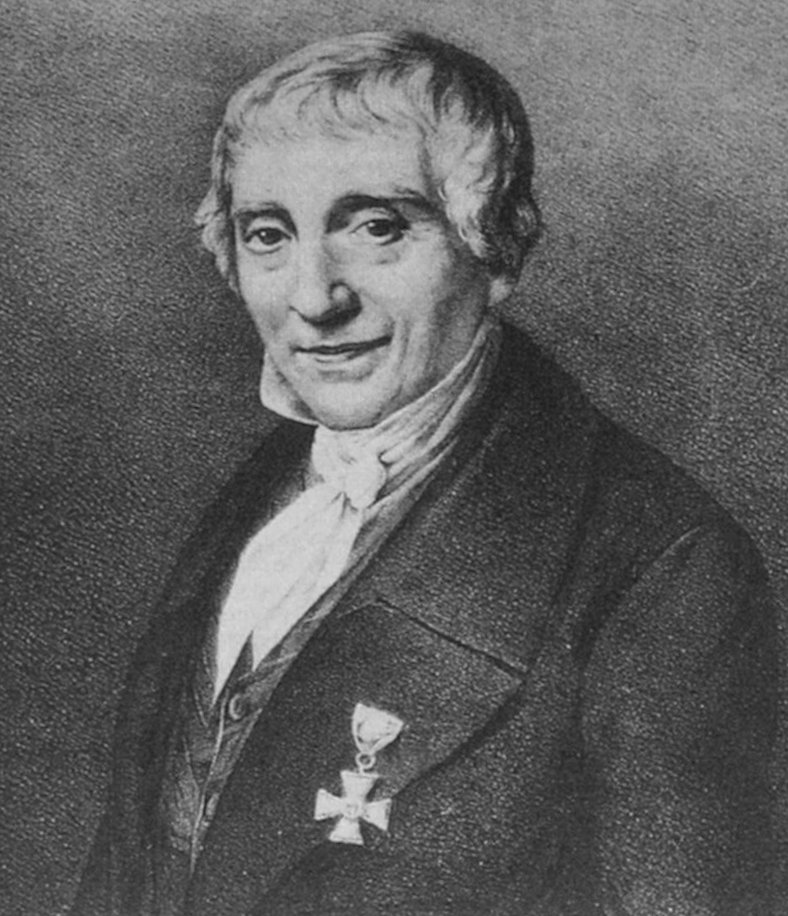
Georg Friedrich Grotefend

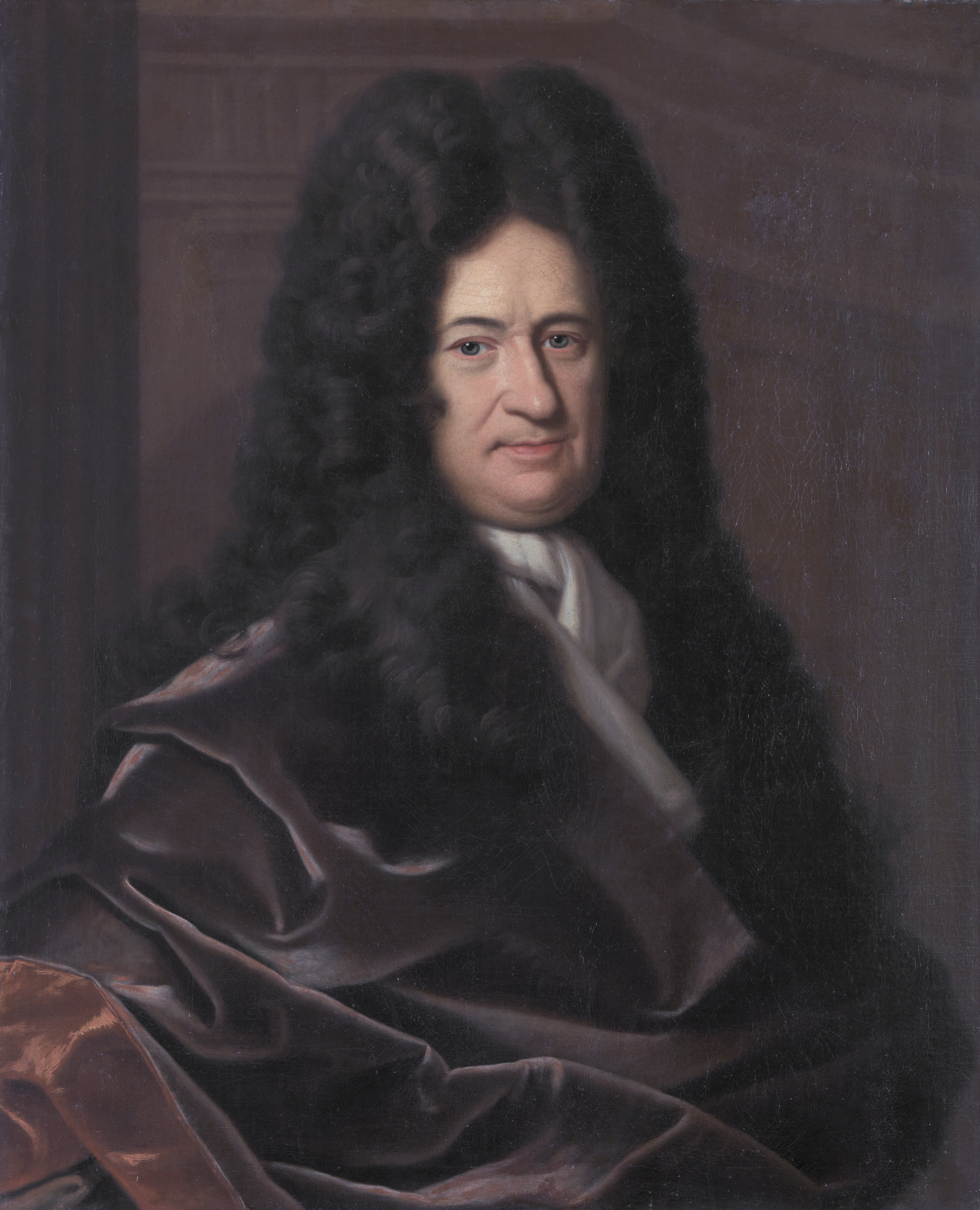
Gottfried Wilhelm Leibniz

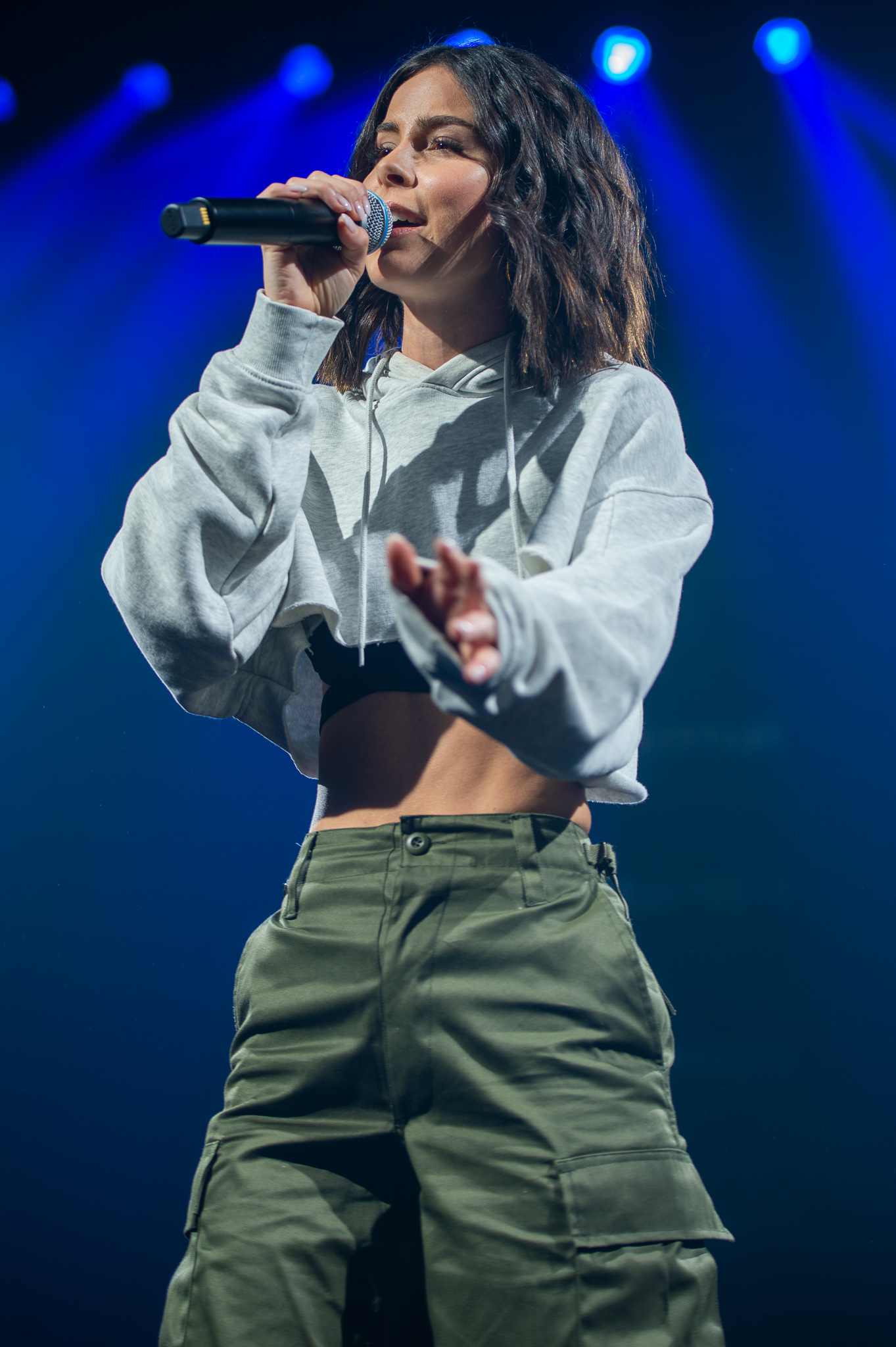
Lena Meyer-Landrut, 2019

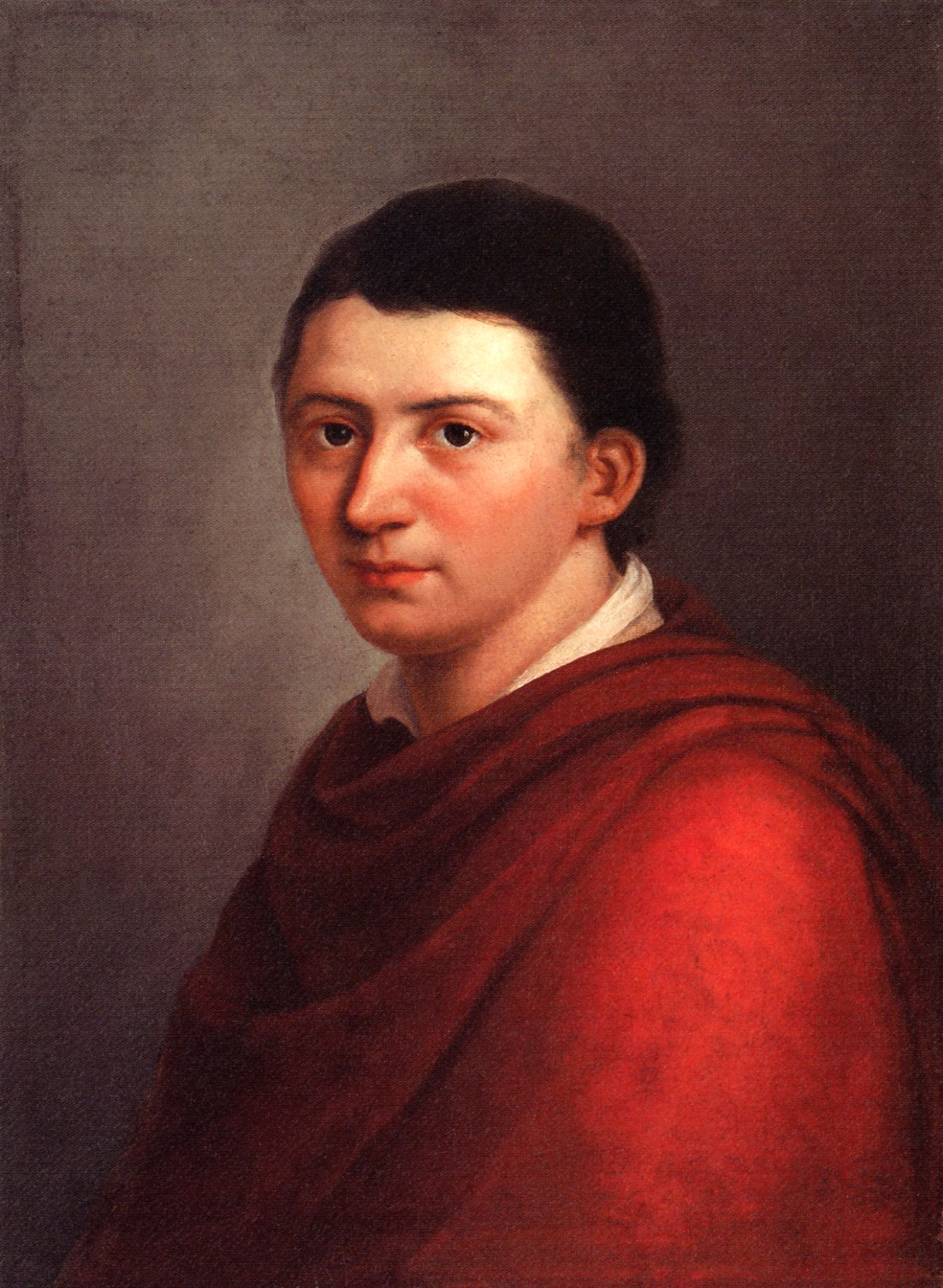
Portrait of Friedrich Schlegel, 1801

- Hannah Arendt (1906–1975), American political theorist
- Erdoğan Atalay (born 1966), actor
- Rudolf Augstein (1923–2002), journalist, founder of the weekly journal Der Spiegel
- Moritz Baier-Lentz (born 1986), German-American venture capitalist
- Hermann Bahlsen (1859–1919), businessman, founder of the biscuit company Bahlsen and inventor of the Leibniz-Keks
- Marc Bator (born 1972), journalist
- Rudolf von Bennigsen (1824–1902), liberal politician
- Klaus Bernbacher (born 1931), conductor, music event manager, broadcasting manager and academic teacher
- Count Johann Hartwig Ernst von Bernstorff (1712–1772) a German-Danish statesman
- Andreas Peter Bernstorff (1735–1797), Danish diplomat and Foreign Minister
- Gero von Boehm (born 1954), director, journalist and television presenter
- Emil Berliner (1851–1929), inventor of the phonograph
- Anke Blume (born 1969), engineering technology professor, works on silica and silane chemistry.
- Herbert Bötticher (1928-2008), actor
- Walter Bruch (1908–1990), inventor of the PAL color television system
- Wilhelm Busch (1832–1908), caricaturist, painter and poet
- Laurent Chappuzeau (ca.1652-??), clockmaker to the Elector of Hanover 1689–1701
- Frederick Dielman (1847–1935), German-American portrait and figure painter
- Albert Christoph Dies (1755–1822), German painter, engraver and biographer
- Champion Jack Dupree (1910–1992), American Born Blues Musician
- Frederick, Prince of Wales (1707–1751), eldest son and heir apparent of King George II of Great Britain
- Gustav Fröhlich (1902–1987), actor and film director
- Oskar Garvens (1874–1951), sculptor and caricaturist
- George I (1660–1727), King of Great Britain and Ireland, prince elector of Hanover
- George II (1683–1760), King of Great Britain and Ireland, prince elector of Hanover
- George III (1738–1820), King of Great Britain and Ireland, prince elector of Hanover
- George William Frederick Charles, duke of Cambridge (1819–1904), Prince George
- Gerhard Glogowski (born 1943), politician (SPD)
- Georg Friedrich Grotefend (1775–1853), epigraphist and philologist
- Robin E. Haak (born 1986), political scientist.
- Fritz Haarmann (1870–1925), prolific serial killer and rapist
- Julia Hamburg (born 1986), politician
- Conrad Wilhelm Hase (1818–1902), architect, founder of the Hanover school of architecture
- Johann Friedrich Ludwig Hausmann (1782–1859) German mineralogist
- William Herschel (1738–1822), astronomer and discoverer of the planet Uranus, and his sister Caroline Herschel (1750–1848), also an astronomer
- Wyn Hoop (born 1936), singer
- Alfred Hugenberg (1865–1951), businessman and politician (DNVP)
- August Wilhelm Iffland (1759–1814), German actor and dramatic author
- Manfred Kohrs (born 1957), tattooist, conceptual artist and Master of Economics
- Dr. Gindi (born 1965), contemporary sculptor
- Georg Ludwig Friedrich Laves (1788–1864), architect
- Gottfried Wilhelm Leibniz (1646–1716), philosopher, mathematician, developed differential and integral calculus
- Ada Lessing (1883-1953), journalist and politician
- Klaus Meine (born 1948), rock musician, vocalist of the rock band Scorpions
- Georg Meissner (1829–1905), anatomist and physiologist
- Otto Fritz Meyerhof (1884–1951), recipient of the Nobel prize in medicine, 1922
- Lena Meyer-Landrut (born 1991), winner of the Eurovision Song Contest 2010
- Reiner E. Moritz (born 1938), film director and producer
- Georg Heinrich Pertz (1795–1876), German historian.
- Oliver Pocher (born 1978), comedian and television presenter
- Rudolf Erich Raspe (1736–1794), German librarian, writer and scientist
- Else Raydt (1883–1931), fashion designer
- Waldemar R. Röhrbein (1935–2014), historian, director of Historisches Museum Hannover
- Wilhelm Georg Friedrich Roscher (1817–1894), German economist
- Dirk Rossmann (born 1946), businessman
- Dieter Roth (1930–1998), artist, print-maker, author, poet and world renowned composer
- Niki de Saint Phalle (1930–2002), sculptor, painter and film maker
- Friedrich Schlegel (1772–1829), poet, literary critic, philosopher and Indologist
- Gerhard Schröder (born 1944), politician (SPD) (former Chancellor of Germany)
- Helga Schuchardt (born 1939), politician and engineer
- Kurt Schumacher (1895–1952), politician, re-organiser of the SPD after World War II
- Kurt Schwitters (1887–1948), artist
- Alexander Moritz Simon (1837–1905), Jewish philanthropist, banker and American vice consul
- Uli Stein (1954–2020), artist, cartoonist
- Rory Te´ Tigo (born 1951), sculptor
- Charles Wachsmuth (1829–1896), German-American paleontologist and businessman
- Gustav Wagemann (1885–1933), German lawyer, judge and civil servant
- Hans Wehrmann (born 1964), entrepreneur, economist, inventor, author and racing driver
- Phylicia Whitney, journalist and public speaker
- Christian Wulff (born 1959), politician (CDU), former President of Germany
- Shlomo Zev Zweigenhaft (1915–2005), Chief Rabbi of Hanover and Lower Saxony

=== Sport ===
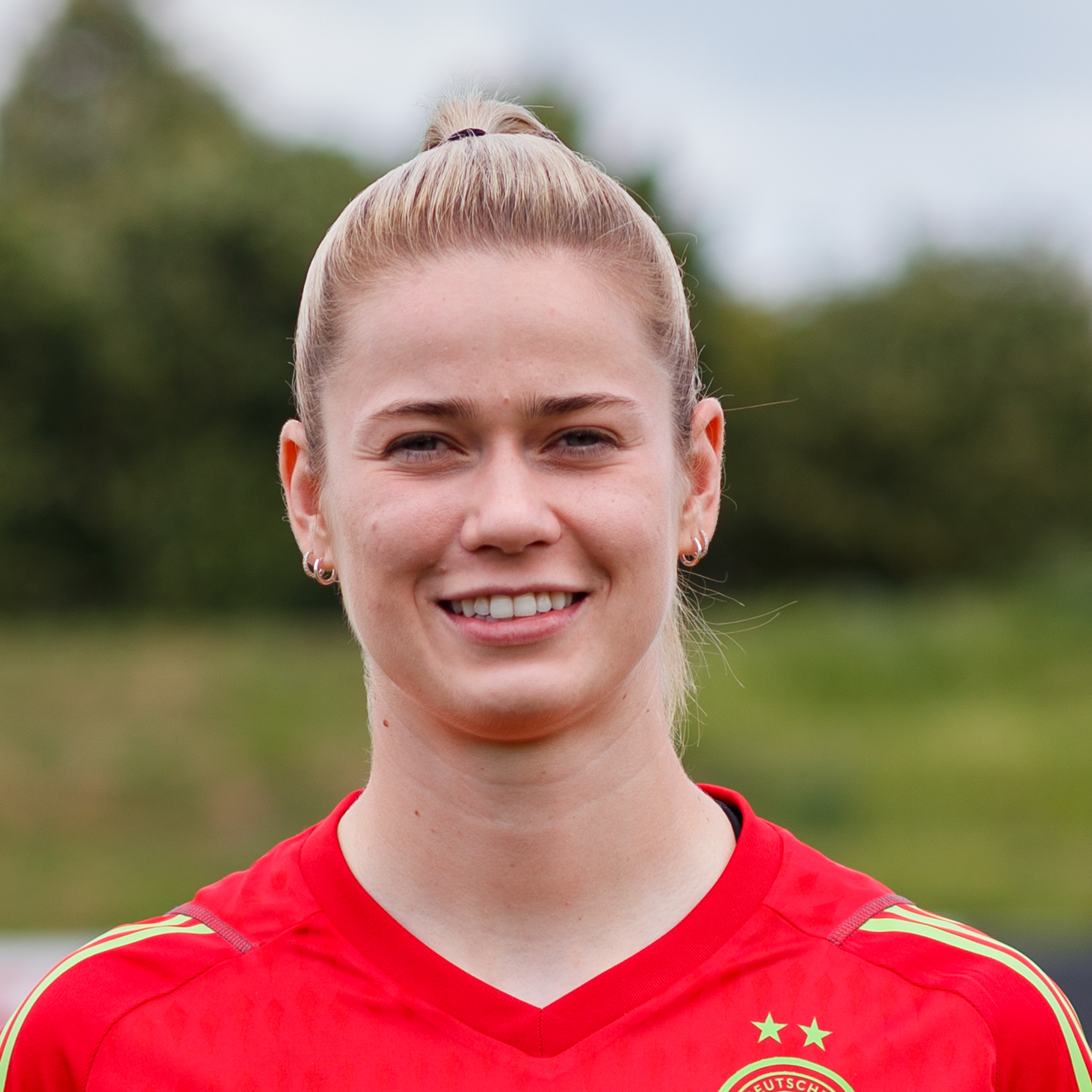
Stina Johannes, 2023

- Husseyn Chakroun (born 2004), footballer
- Johannes Dietwald (born 1985), footballer
- Hilal El-Helwe (born 1994), German-Lebanese football player
- Niclas Füllkrug (born 1993), footballer
- Stina Johannes (born 2000), footballer, goalkeeper for the Germany women's national football team
- Niklas Mackschin (born 1994), racing driver
- Jan Martín (born 1984), German-Israeli-Spanish basketball player
- Arnd Meier (born 1973), racing driver
- Per Mertesacker (born 1984), footballer
- Jennifer Plass (born 1985), field hockey player
- Daniel Reiss (born 1982), ice hockey player
- Andreas Toba (born 1990), artistic gymnast
- Günter Twiesselmann (1925–2025), rower
- Dirk Werner (born 1981), racing driver

== Twin towns – sister cities ==
Hanover is twinned with:

- Blantyre, Malawi (1968)
- Bristol, England, United Kingdom (1947)
- Hiroshima, Japan (1983)
- Leipzig, Germany (1987)
- Perpignan, France (1960)
- Poznań, Poland (1979)
- Rouen, France (1966)

Hanover also cooperates with:

- Mykolaiv, Ukraine (2022)

== See also ==
- CeBIT (CeBIT Computer Messe)
- Expo 2000
- Hanover Fair (Hannover Messe)
- History of the Jews in Hanover
- Metropolitan region Hanover-Braunschweig-Göttingen-Wolfsburg
- Schützenfest Hanover
