= Georg Ludwig Friedrich Laves =

German architect (1788–1864)

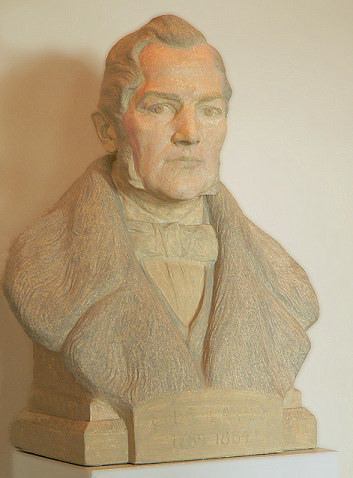
- Bust of Laves in Laves House, Hanover
- Born: 17 December 1788; Uslar, Lower Saxony
- Died: 30 April 1864 (aged 75); Hanover, Lower Saxony
- Burial place: Engesohde Cemetery, Hanover
- Occupations: Architect, civil engineer and urban planner
- Spouse: Wilhelmine Kestner
- Children: George; Carl; Ernst; Ernestine
- Parents: Ernst Friedrich Laves (father); Ernestine Amalie Laves (mother)
- Relatives: Johann Friedrich Laves (uncle); Heinrich Christoph Jussow (uncle)

Georg Ludwig Friedrich Laves (17 December 1788 – 30 April 1864) was a German architect, civil engineer and urban planner. Born in Uslar, Lower Saxony, he lived and worked primarily in the city of Hanover and also died there. He was appointed Oberhofbaudirektor, "court master builder", in 1852. As the leading architect of the Kingdom of Hanover for a career spanning 50 years, he had great influence on the urban development of this city. Alongside Karl Friedrich Schinkel in Berlin and Leo von Klenze in Munich, Laves was one of the most accomplished neoclassical style architects of Germany. As an engineer he developed a special iron truss lenticular or "fishbelly" beam bridge construction method, the so-called "Lavesbrücke". Laves found his final resting place in the Engesohde Cemetery (Engesohder Friedhof) in Hanover.

Among his most important works are:

- Full reconstruction of the Leineschloss (Leine Palace or Leine Castle), between 1816 and 1844 (severely damaged in World War II and again re-built by Dieter Oesterlen between 1957 and 1962).
- Hanover Opera House, home of the Staatsoper Hannover, built between 1845 and 1852 (severely damaged in World War II and re-built in 1948).
- Wangenheim palace for Count Georg von Wangenheim, built between 1829 and 1832.
- The facade of Herrenhausen Palace (Schloss Herrenhausen) in neoclassical style, about 1820/21 (destroyed in World War II and rebuilt in 2013).
- The Palmenhaus ("Palm-house"), a conservatory in the Berggarten built between 1846 and 1849 (destroyed in World War II). The building housed the most extensive and valuable collection of palms in Europe.
- The mausoleum for King Ernest Augustus, King of Hanover, and his consort Frederica of Mecklenburg-Strelitz in the garden of the Chapel at Schloss Herrenhausen (the mausoleum today is situated in the Berggarten, part of the Herrenhausen Gardens), built between 1842 and 1847.
- Waterloo Square with Waterloo Column, built between 1826 and 1832.
- Some structures designed or remodeled in the landscape garden around the Derneburg Castle near Hildesheim, owned by Count Ernst zu Münster

== Gallery ==
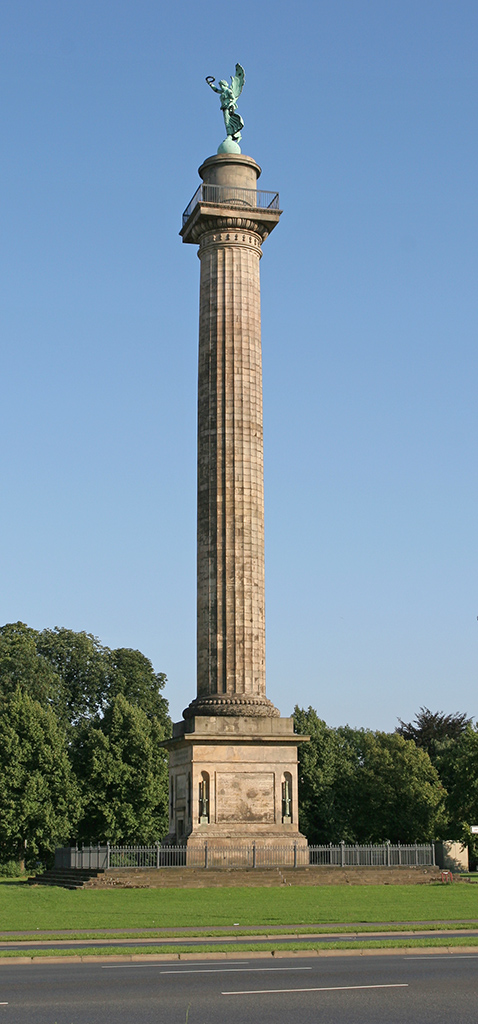
Waterloo Column on Waterloo Square, Hanover

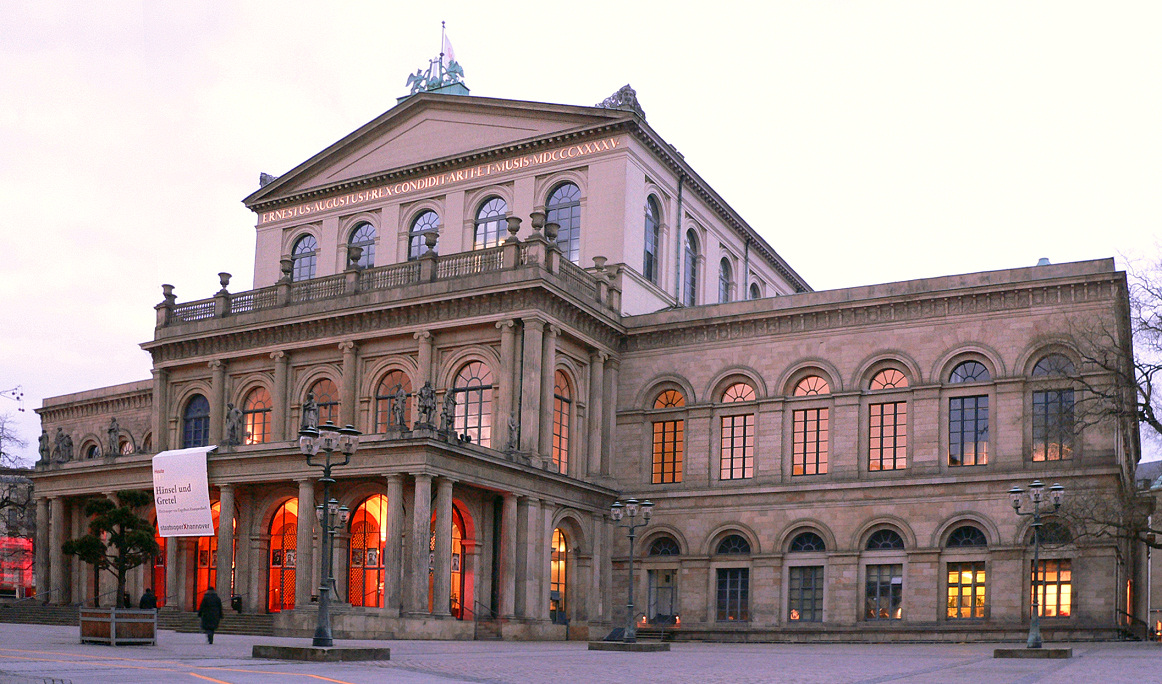
Hanover Opera House

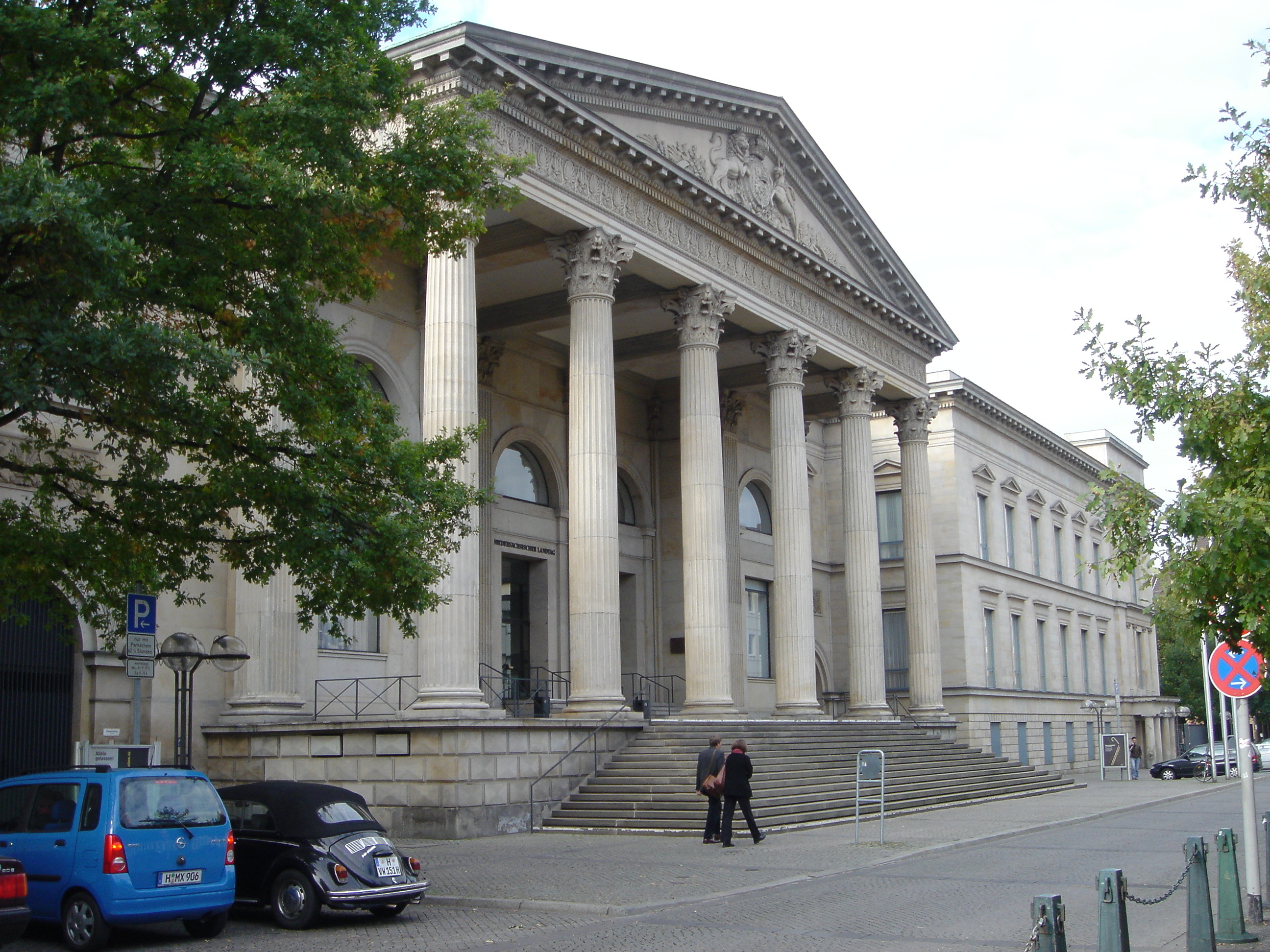
Leine Palace, Hanover

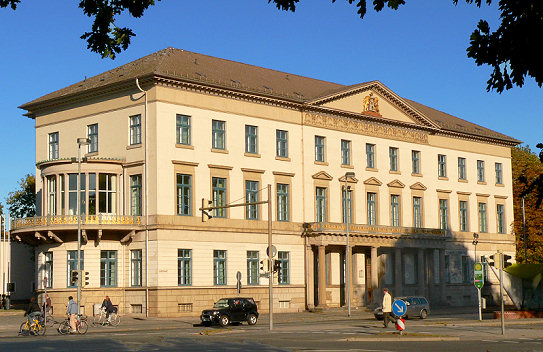
Wangenheim Palace, Hanover

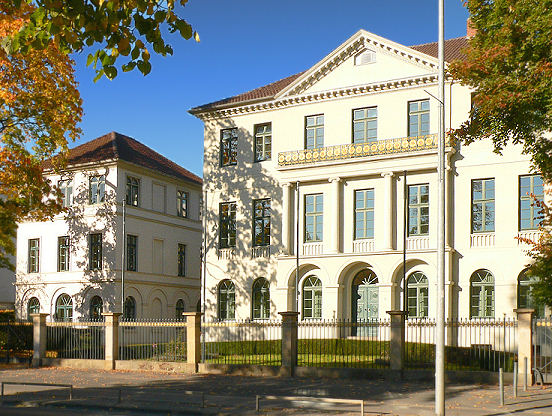
The Laveshaus, the Hanover building where Laves resided

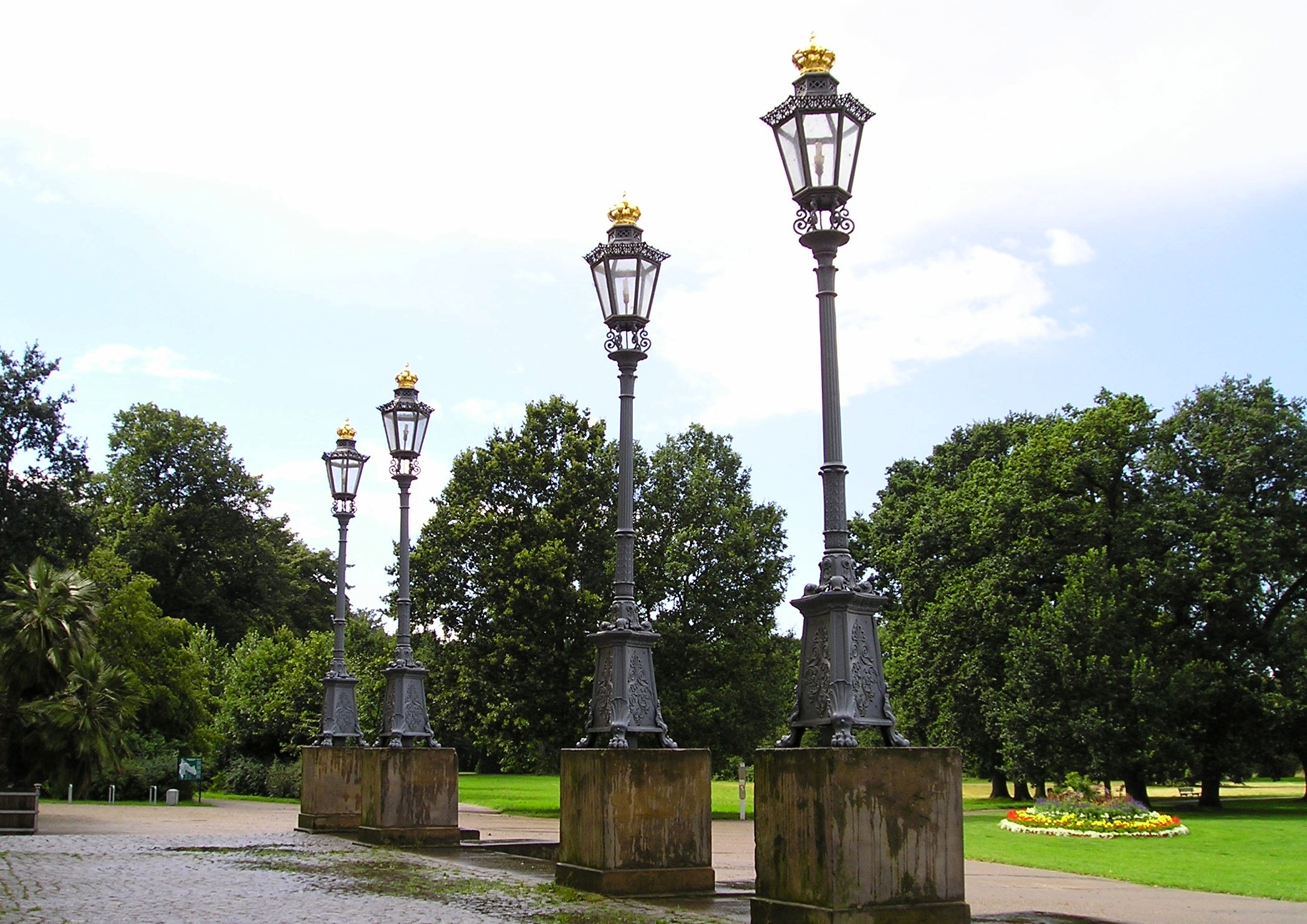
Candelabra in front of the Wilhelm-Busch-Museum in the Georgengarten, Hanover

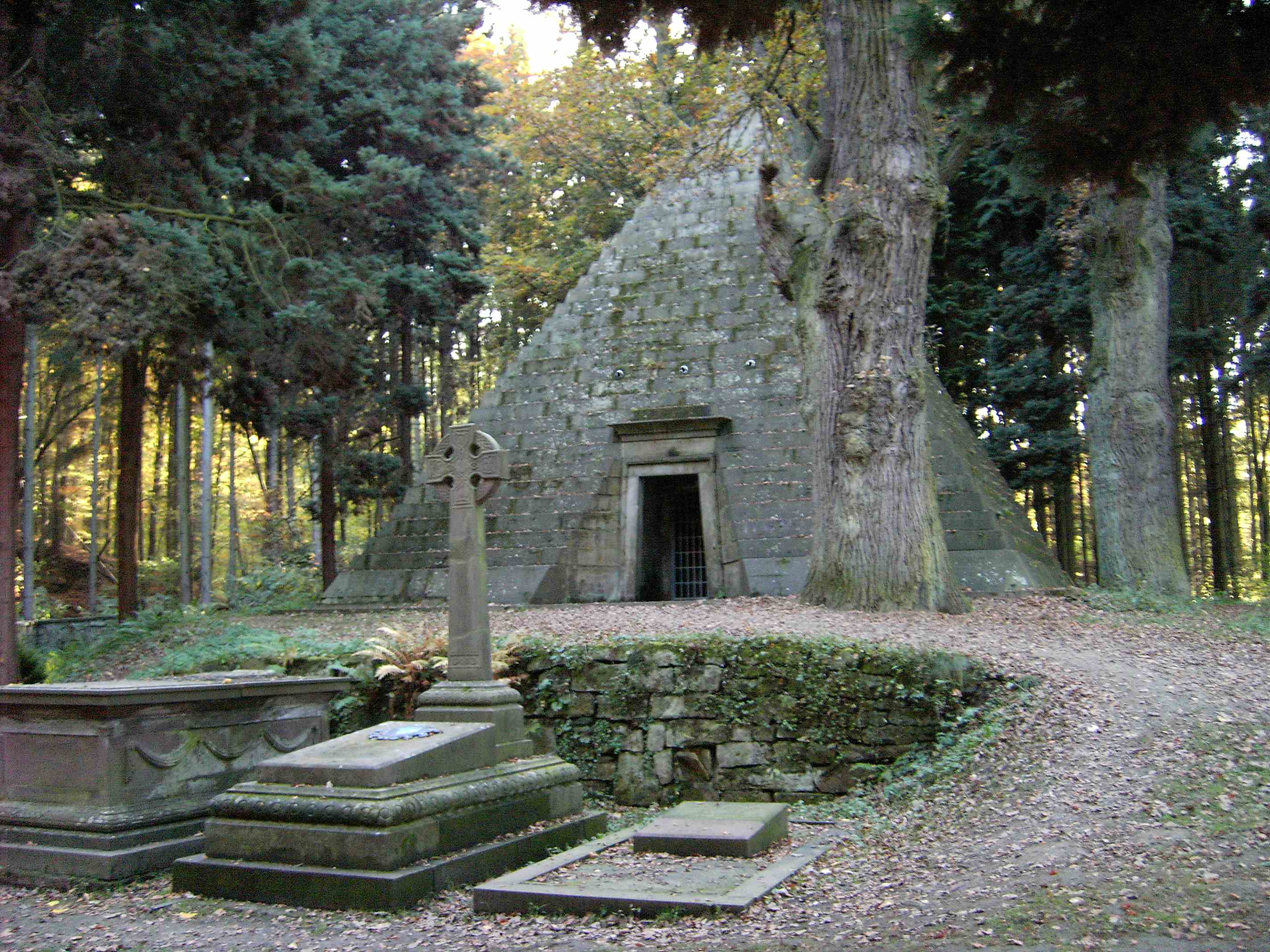
The mausoleum at Derneburg Castle

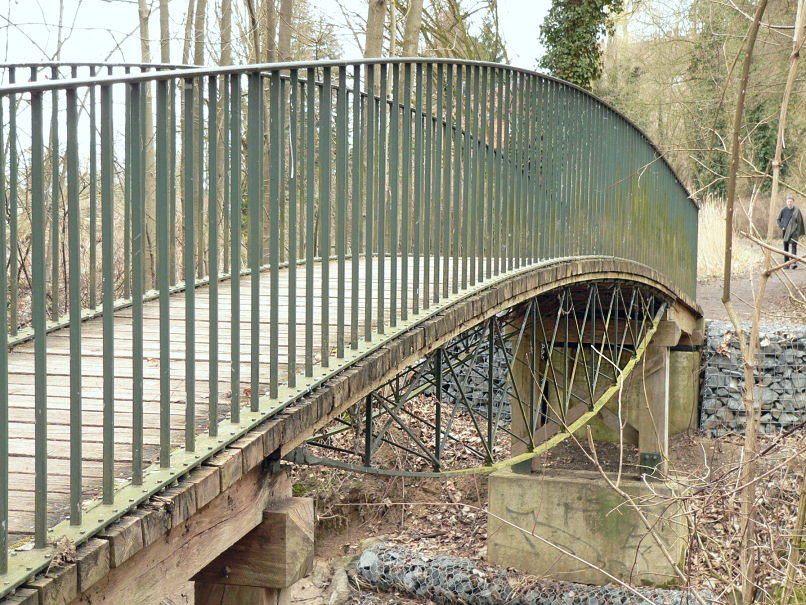
The "Laves bridge" at Derneburg Castle (reconstructed)

== General references ==
- "Georg Ludwig Friedrich Laves". Lavesstiftung (in German).
- Kokkelink, Günther [in German] (1985). "Laves, Georg Ludwig Friedrich". Deutsche Biographie. Neue Deutsche Biographie (in German). pp. 2–3.
- Landeshauptstadt Hannover, ed. (3 November 2022). "Georg Ludwig Friedrich Laves". Hannover.de.
- Spindler, Sabine (20 February 2023). Landeshauptstadt Hannover (ed.). "Georg Ludwig Friedrich Laves: Stardesigner des Königs". Weltkunst.
- "Der Rote Faden: Stadtführer durch Hannover" (PDF). Hannover entdecken …. 20 February 2023. p. 11. Archived (PDF) from the original on 15 February 2023.
