= Herrenhausen Gardens =

Park in Hanover, Germany

Coordinates: 52°23′30″N 9°41′54″E

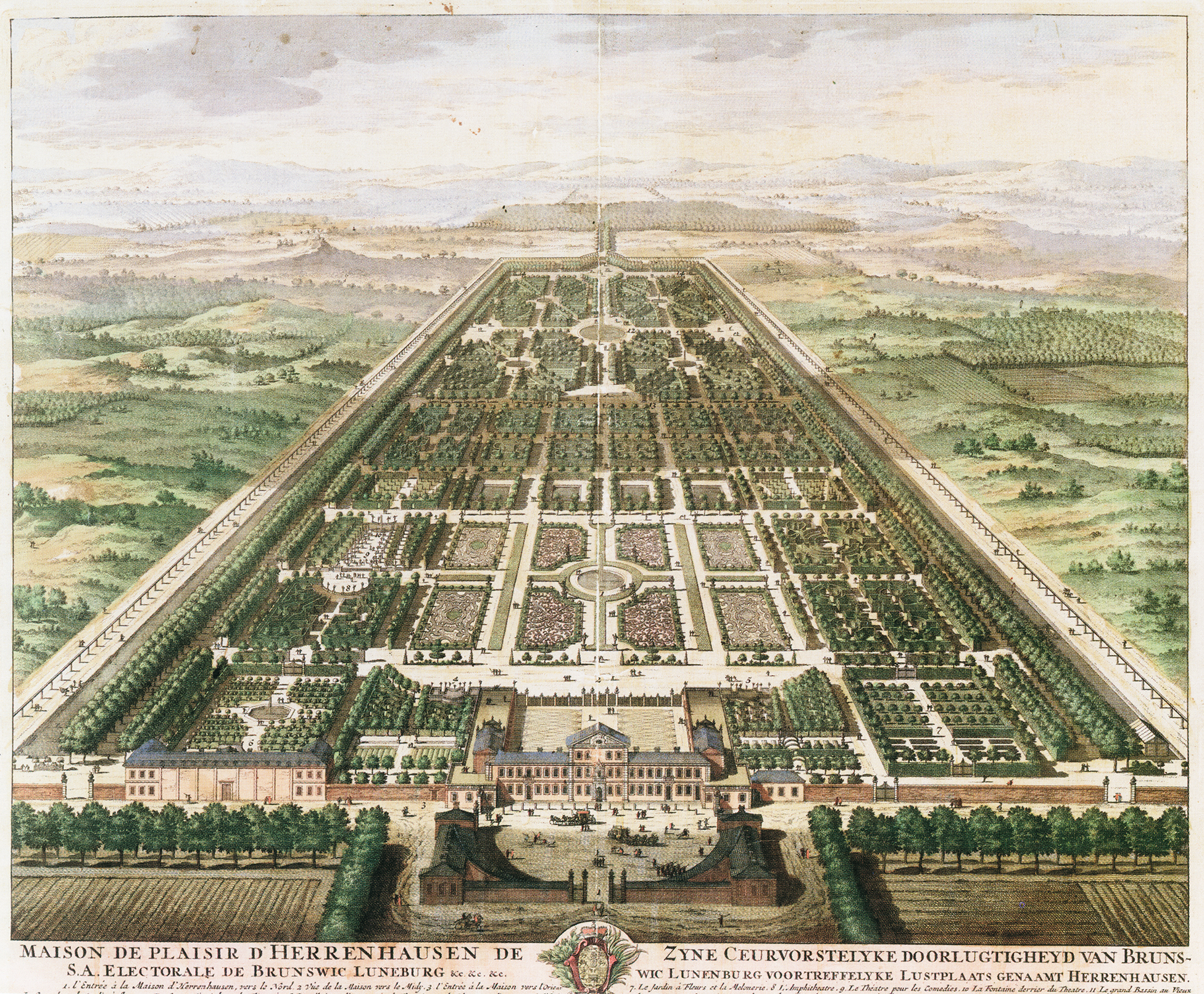
The Great Garden, c. 1708

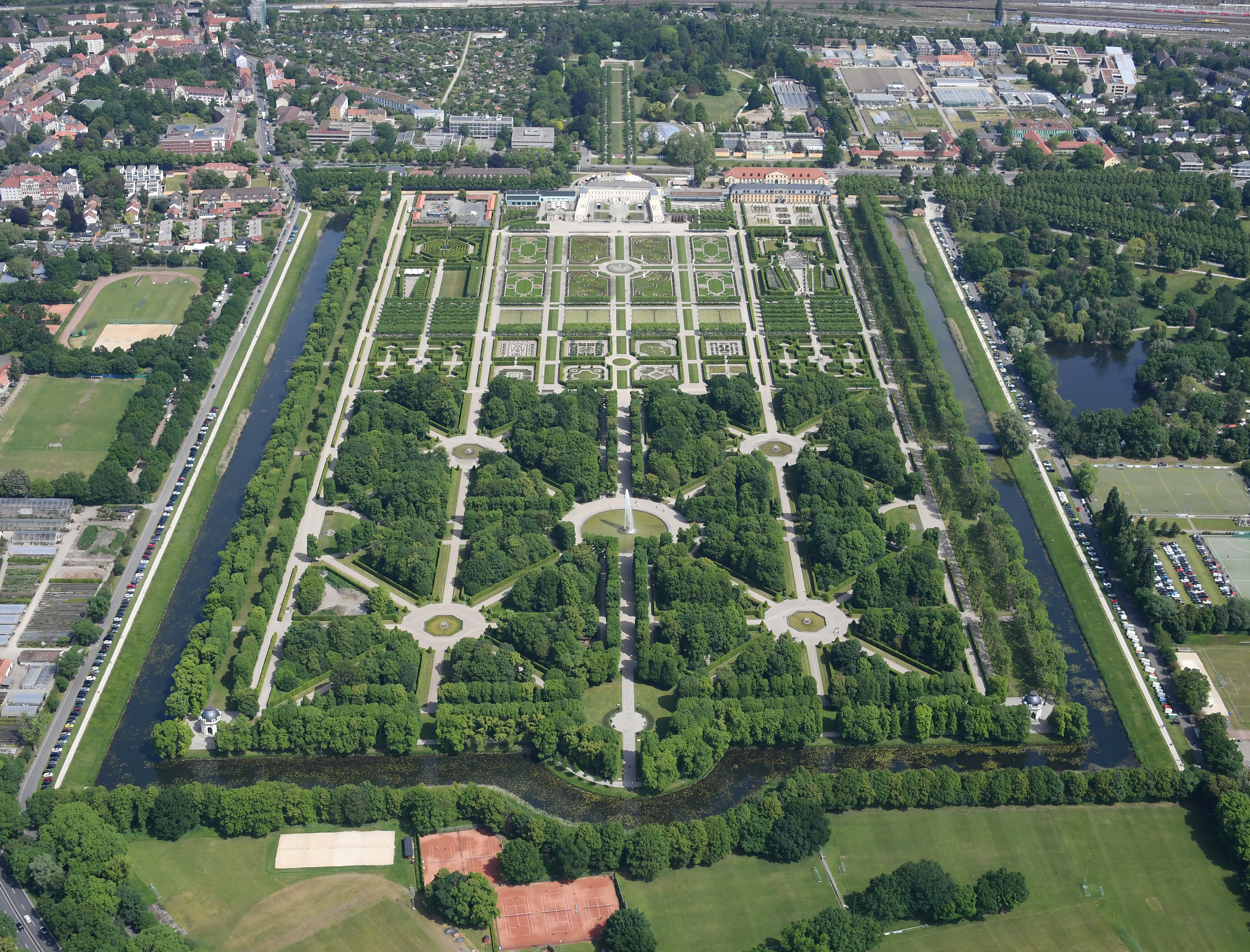
Aerial image of the Herrenhausen Gardens from its south, showing the Great Garden in front of, and the Hill Garden behind, the reconstructed Herrenhausen Palace towards the top of the image

The Herrenhausen Gardens (German: Herrenhäuser Gärten, IPA: [ˈhɛʁn̩hɔʏzɐ ˈɡɛʁtn̩]) of Herrenhausen Palace are located in Herrenhausen, an urban district of Hanover, the capital of Lower Saxony, Germany. Dating to the era of the prince-electors of Hanover and kings of Hanover, they comprise Great Garden (Großer Garten), Hill Garden (Berggarten), Georgen Garden (Georgengarten) and Guelf Garden (Welfengarten).

The Great Garden has always been one of the most distinguished Baroque gardens of Europe, while the Hill Garden has been transformed over the years from a simple vegetable garden into a large botanical garden with its own attractions. Both the Georgen Garden and the Guelf Garden are in the style of English gardens and are considered popular recreation areas for the residents of Hanover. The history of the gardens spans several centuries, and they remain a popular attraction to this day.

== Great Garden ==
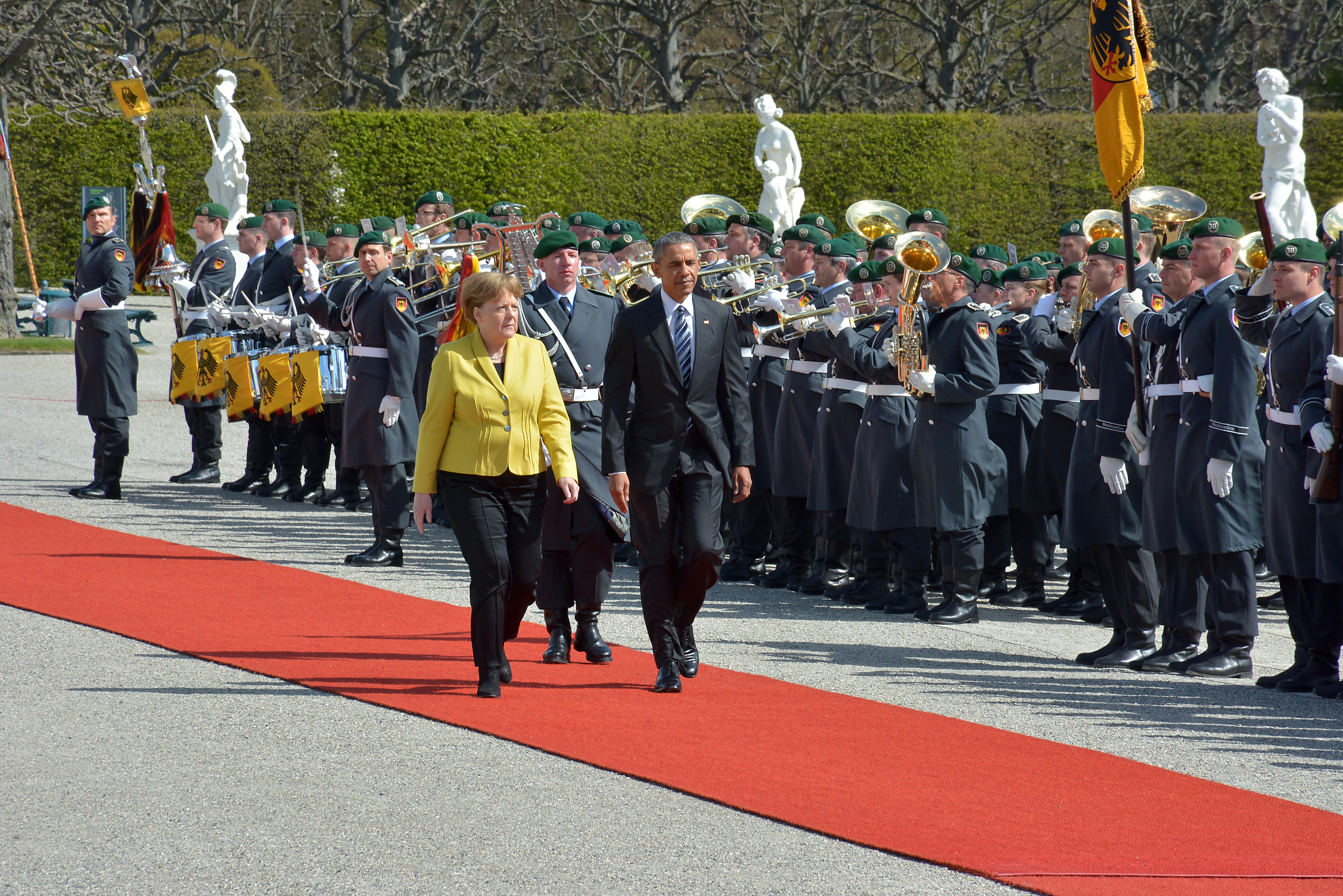
In 2016, German Chancellor Angela Merkel welcomed the 44th President of the United States of America Barack Obama in the Great Garden.

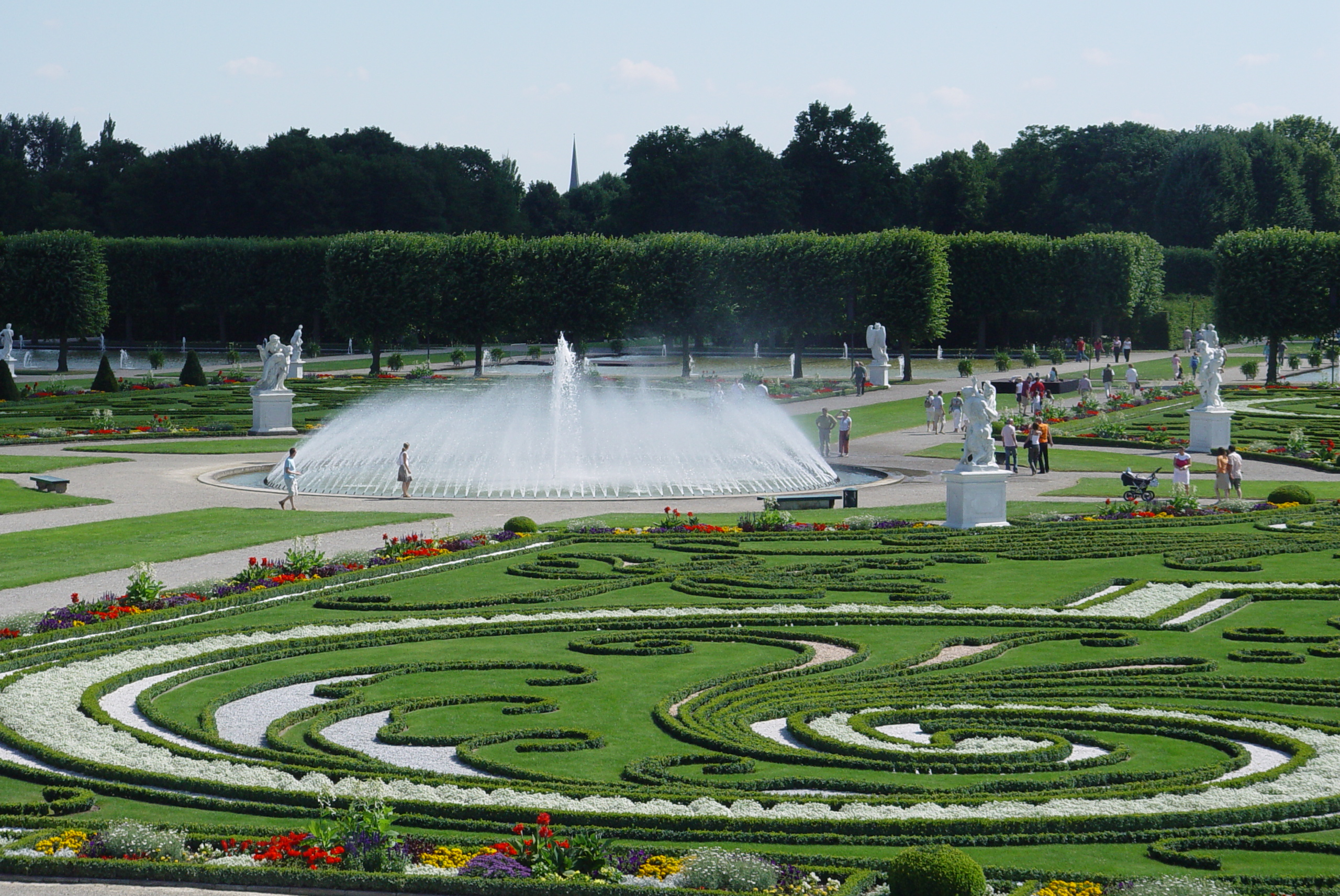
Fountain in the Great Garden

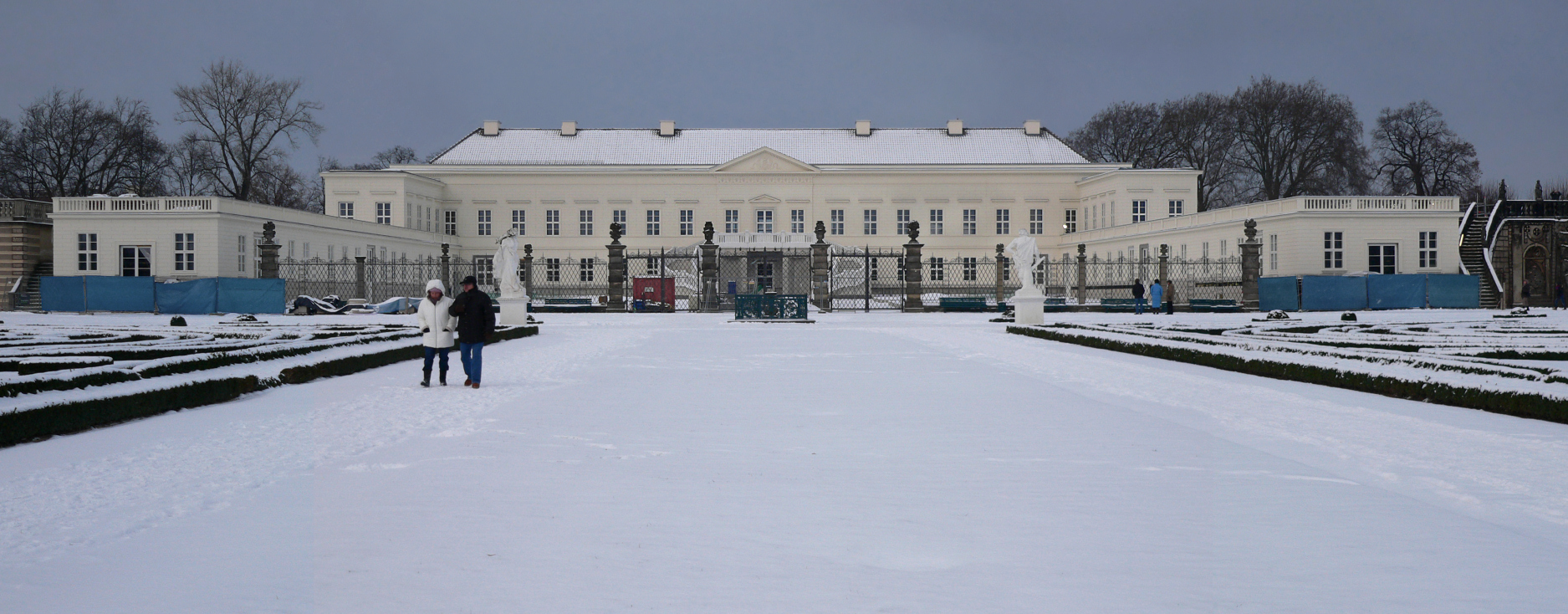
The reconstructed Herrenhausen Palace in 2013

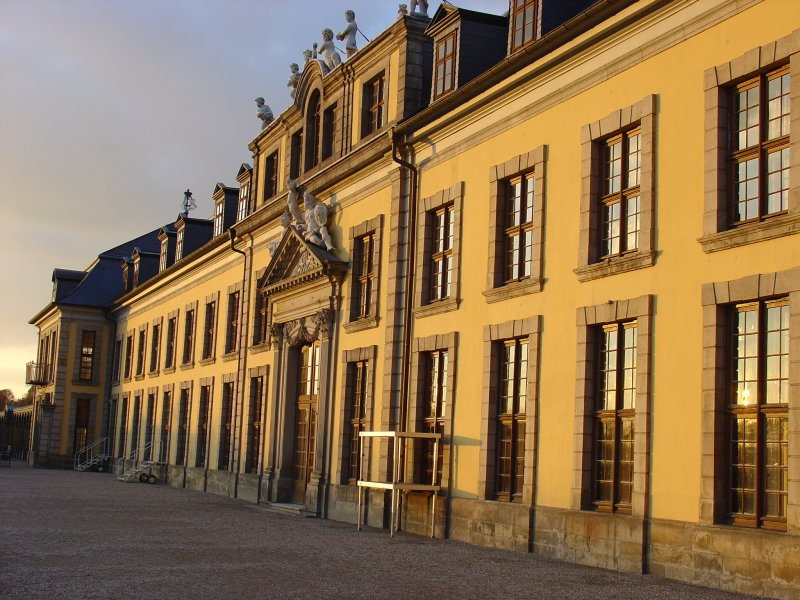
The Gallery building in the Great Garden

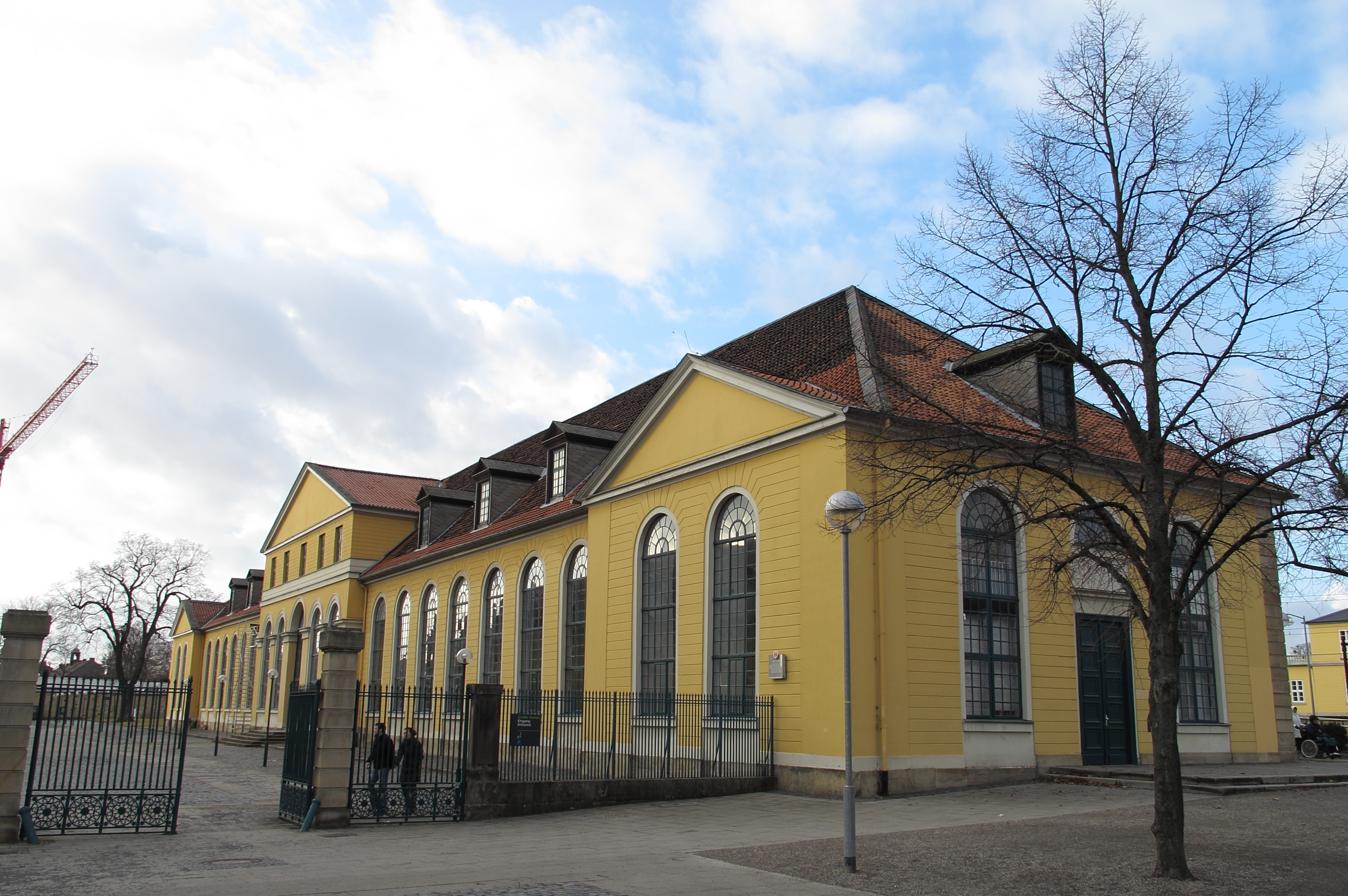
The Orangery building in the Great Garden

The Great Garden owes much of its aesthetics to Sophia of Hanover, consort of the Elector of Hanover and herself heiress to the British throne, who commissioned the French gardener Martin Charbonnier in 1683 to enlarge an existing garden. It served as a summer retreat, located only a few kilometers outside the city, while the Leine Palace was the main residence in the city. As its name implies, it indeed became a large garden, comprising 50 hectares (120 acres) of lawns, hedges, walkways, and statues arranged in strict geometrical patterns.

Centrepiece of the garden is the, rather small, Herrenhausen Palace, originally a manor house in 1640 that was enlarged beginning in 1676. Whereas Sophia's husband, Ernest Augustus, Elector of Brunswick-Luneburg, planned its replacement with a large baroque palace, and began constructions with the nearby grand Gallery building, their son, elector George Louis, who in 1714 succeeded to the British throne as King George I, gave the palace project up and concentrated on water features. Sophia, Ernest Augustus and George I are buried in the mausoleum in the Hill Garden. The next king, George II, also planned for a new palace in better proportion with the Great Garden, but he too never proceeded. His successor George III, who never visited Herrenhausen, had the palace modernized in neoclassical style by Georg Ludwig Friedrich Laves.

The Great Garden suffered immense damage during World War II; the British Royal Family had requested the Royal Air Force not to attack the palace, at the time still owned by the House of Hanover, but it was damaged by bombs during an air raid in 1943. The ruins of the palace were almost completely torn down after the war; the outside staircase once leading up to the entrance was salvaged from the debris and moved next to the Orangerie building where it can be seen today. In 2009, the decision was made to rebuild the palace, construction began in 2010, and the rebuilt Herrenhausen Palace was reopened on 18 January 2013.

Every summer, the Great Garden plays host a large variety of festivals. The 'Festival of Small Arts' (Kleinkunstfestival) takes place over several days and offers a wide range of artistic displays, and the 'Small Festival in the Great Garden' (Kleines Fest im Großen Garten) has become firmly entrenched as a highlight of the 'Festival Week Herrenhausen' (Festwochen Herrenhausen). Lastly, the garden is the site of an international fireworks competition which evolved from a local attraction.

The 'State Stage of Hanover' (Landesbühne Hannover) uses the Garden Theatre of the Great Garden during the summer for both musicals and other theatrical performances. Similarly, the building that houses the garden's orangery is utilized for both art exhibits and performances of classical music; matinee performances are presented in the foyer. The focal point of the garden is the Great Fountain which can, with optimal weather conditions, reach a maximum height of 80 metres (260 ft). The original fountain was based on ideas of Gottfried Leibniz and was inaugurated in 1719 during the visit of George I. In 1721, it reached a height of some 35 metres (115 ft) which made it the highest fountain in European courts. The fountain and its pumping works were renewed in 1860.

The Great Garden is also the site of one of the last works of the artist Niki de Saint Phalle. She modified the three-roomed grotto in the northwestern section of the garden, which had served as a store room in the eighteenth century, by adding various items, including crystals, minerals, glass and seashells. Between 2001 and 2003, when the exhibit opened, de Saint Phalle and her coworkers covered the walls and interior with mosaics of molded glass and mirrors. Two rooms branch off from the octagon-shaped central room, and on the front wall of each of them is a statue set within a small recession in the wall. De Saint Phalle's intention for this exhibit was that the visitors could use the grotto as a cool retreat on hot summer days while at the same time being enchanted by the decorations.

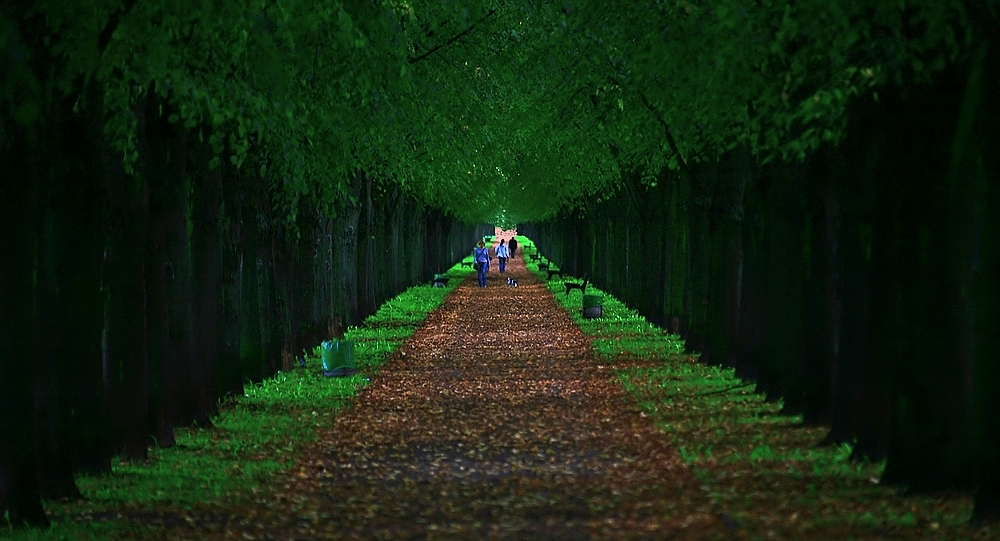
One of the alleys

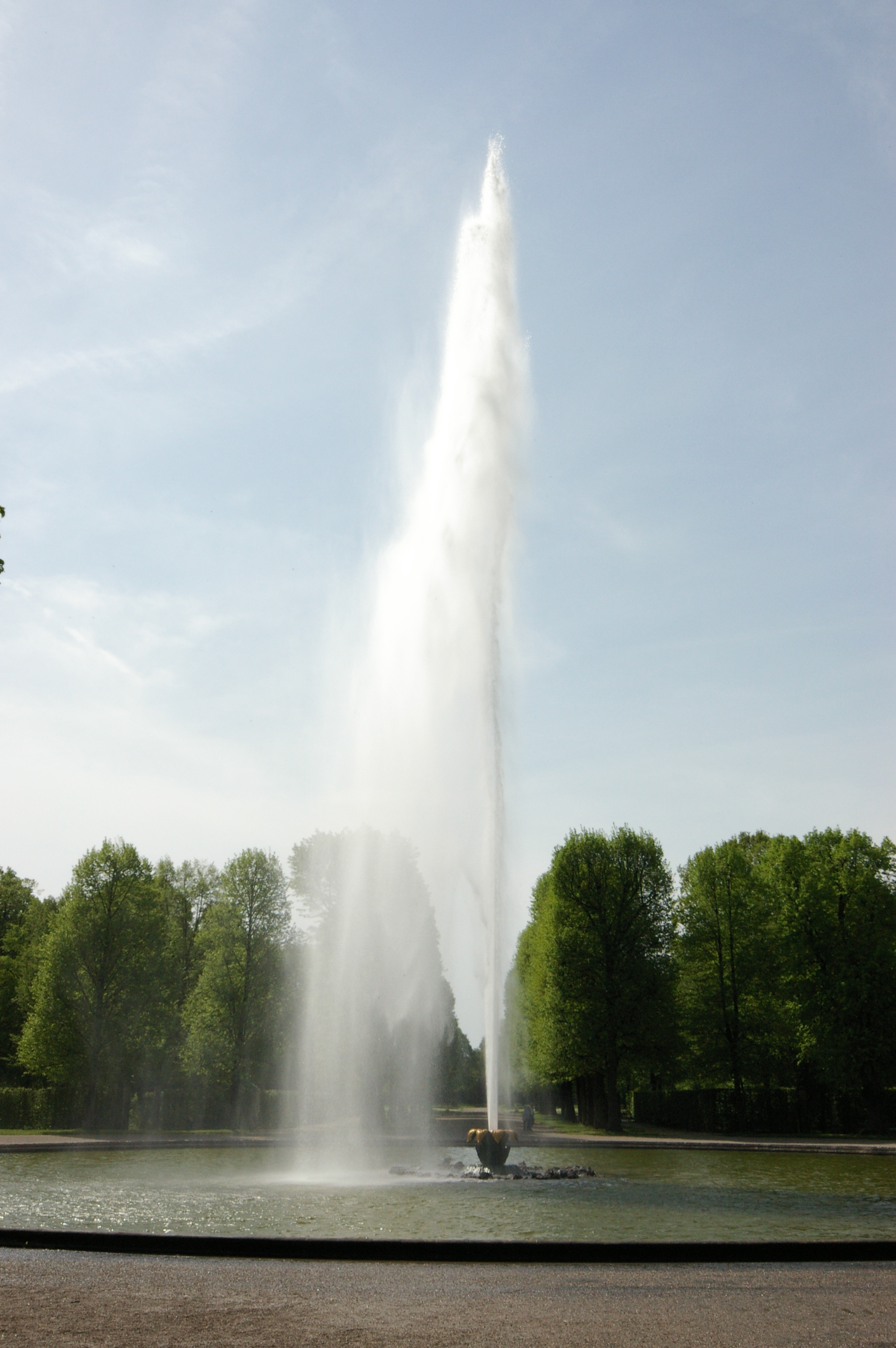
Fountain

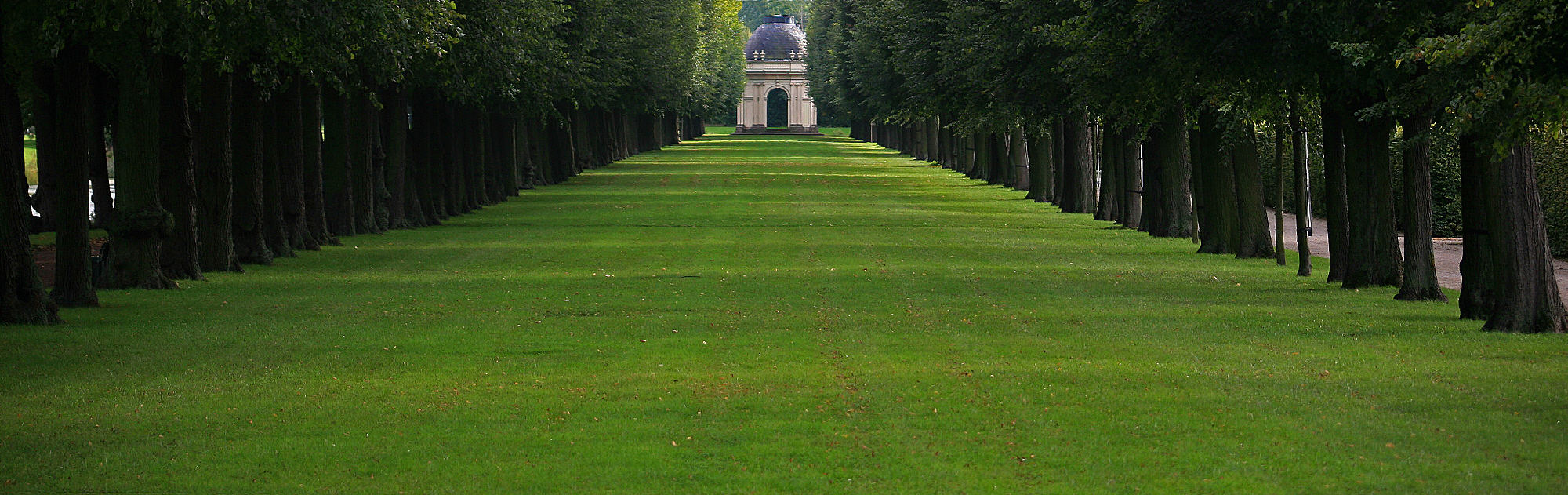
Temple Alley

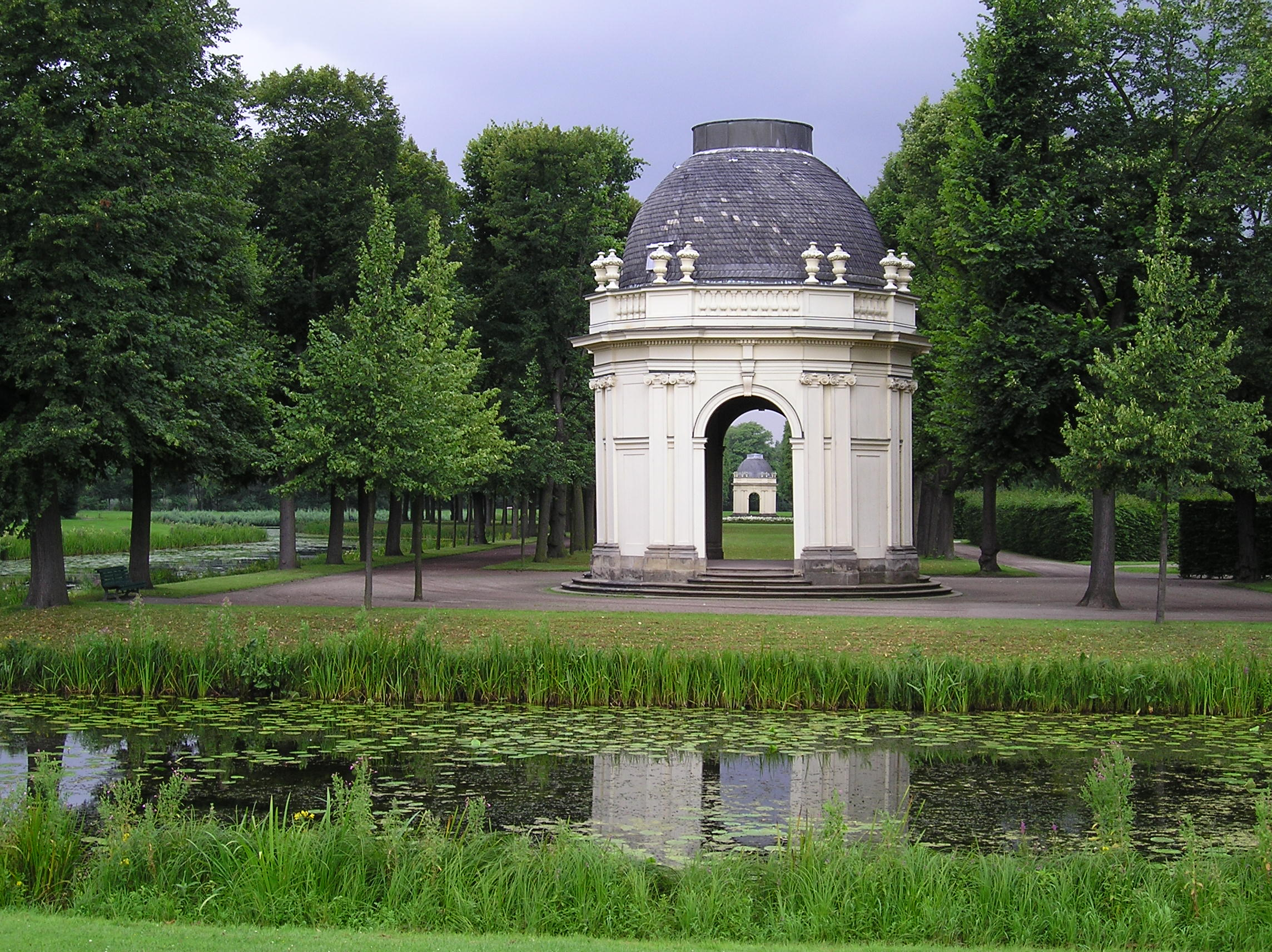
Corner Pavilion by Louis Remy de la Fosse

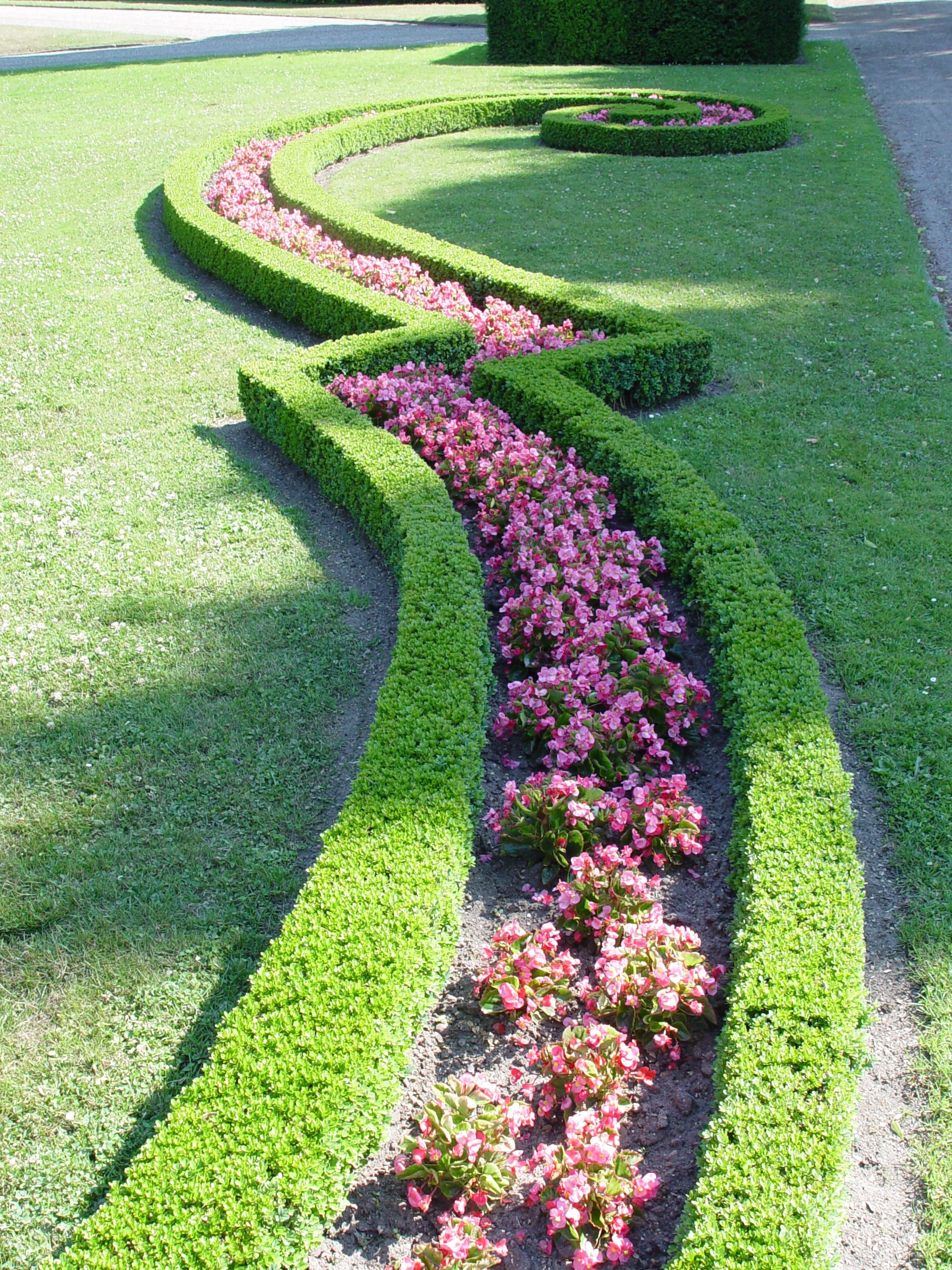
Detail of a broderie

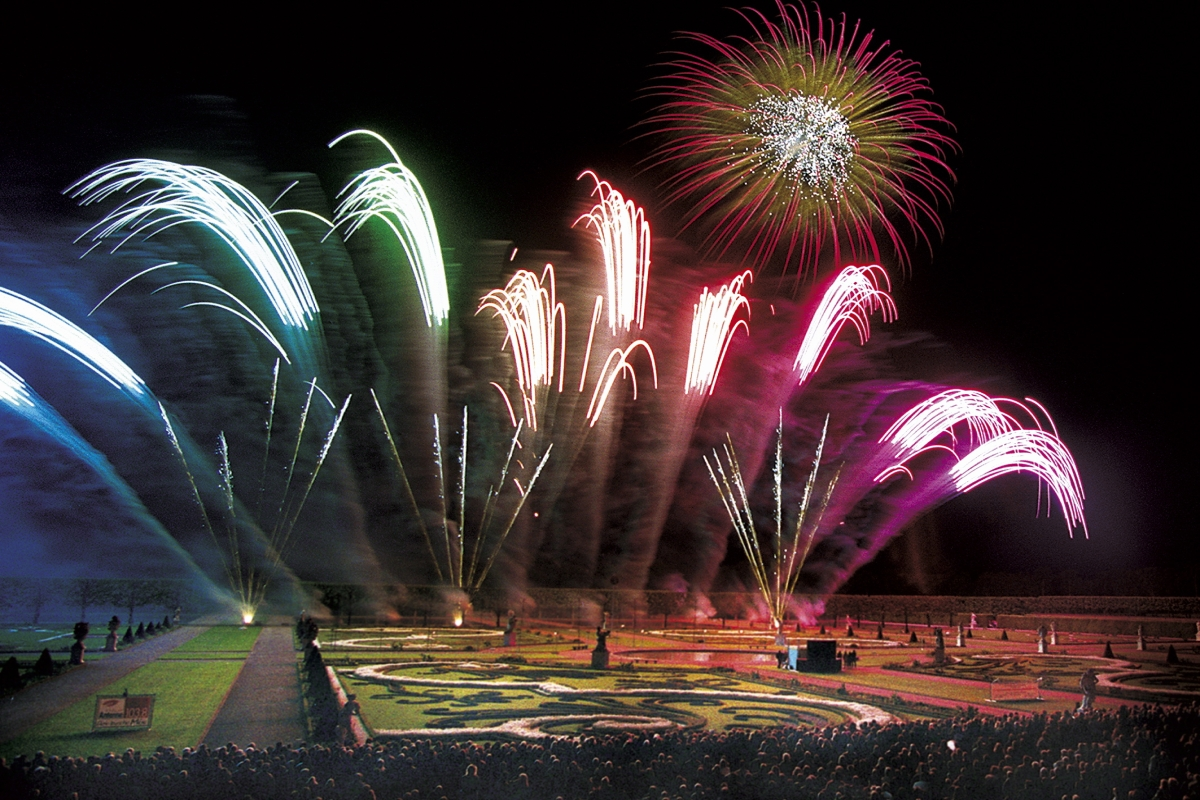
Fireworks in the Great Garden

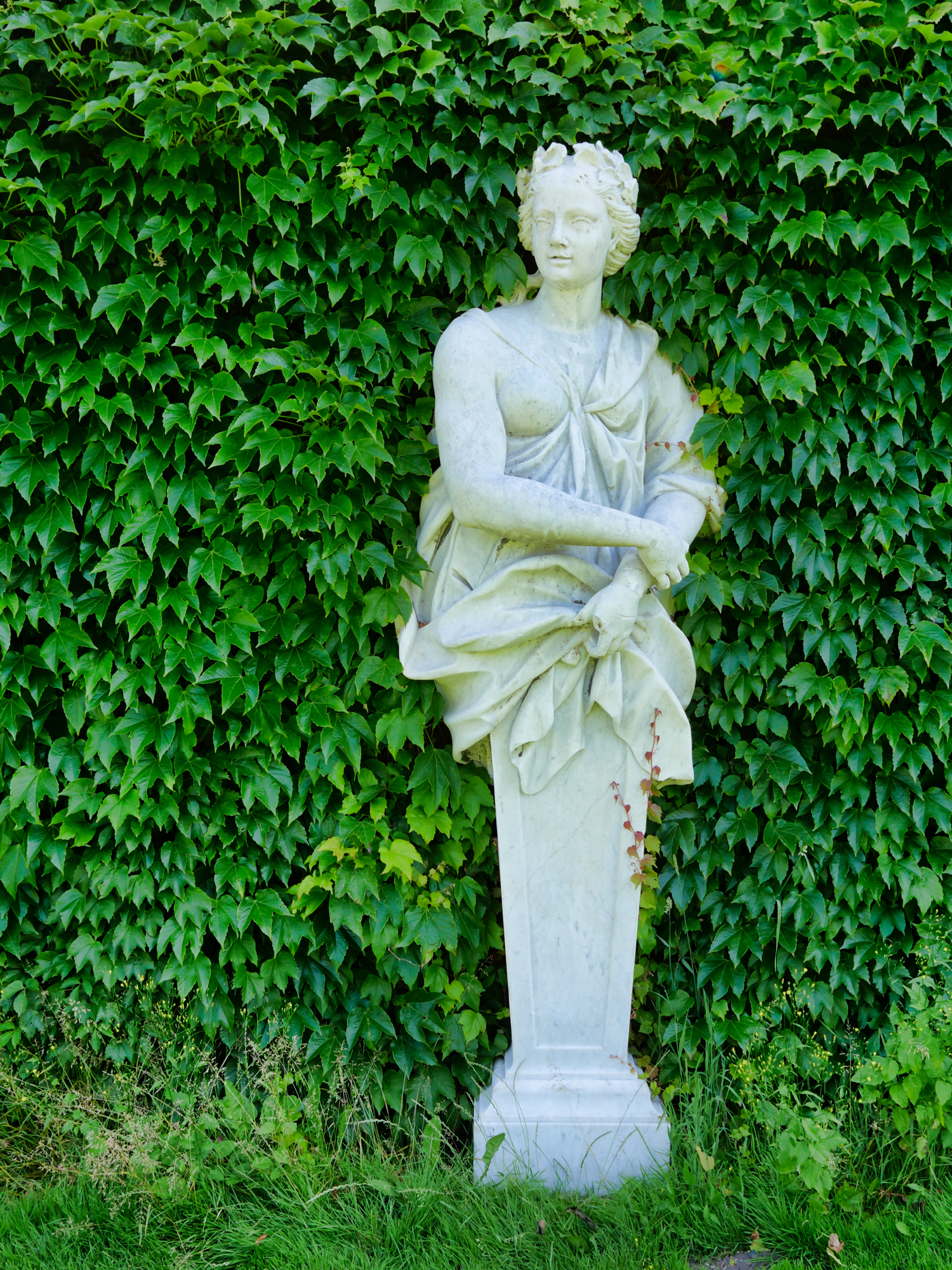
A statue in the Herrenhausen Gardens

== Hill Garden ==
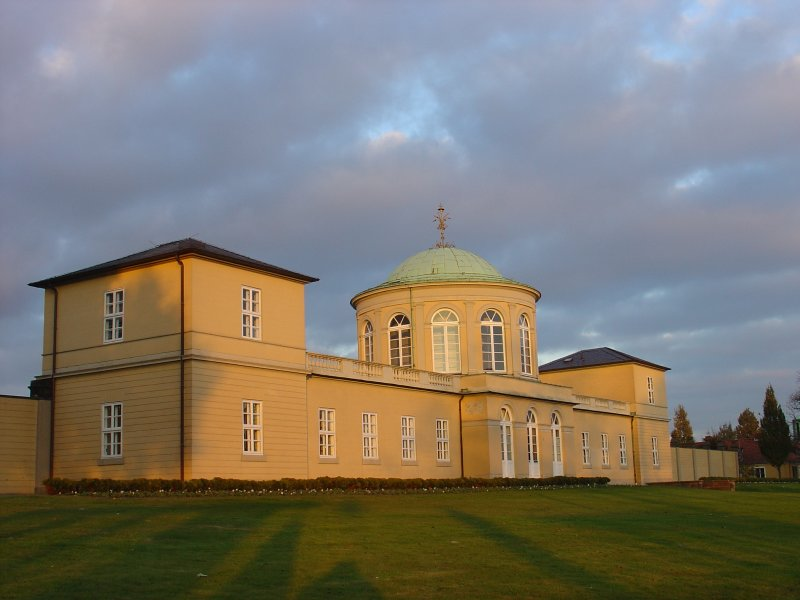
Library building in the Hill Garden

The Hill Garden was established in 1666 as a vegetable garden for the Great Garden on a hill north of the Herrenhäuser Castle. Sophia of Hanover later transformed the Hill Garden into a garden for exotic plants, and in 1686 a conservatory was erected.

The garden once served more than an aesthetic purpose; it was used to experiment with the breeding in the northern climate of Lower Saxony of plants normally native to southern lands. While this experiment failed in its attempts to grow rice, it was successful with plants such as tobacco and mulberry. As a result, the silkworms located in the nearby city of Hamelin that were used in the production of royal silk began to be fed with Herrenhäuser mulberry leaves in 1706. However, this experiment did not pay off long-term: in 1750 the Kitchen Garden (Küchengarten) in the neighbouring city of Linden (now a district of the City of Hanover) took over the job of supporting the aristocracy with produce, and the Hill Garden has since been exclusively a botanical garden.

Between 1817 and 1820, a caretaker's hut was built on the garden's grounds. In 1846, work began on the Palm House (Palmenhaus), a conservatory designed by architect Georg Ludwig Friedrich Laves and containing, as the name implies, palm trees. Within five years of its completion in 1849, the building housed the most valuable and extensive collection of palms in all of Europe.

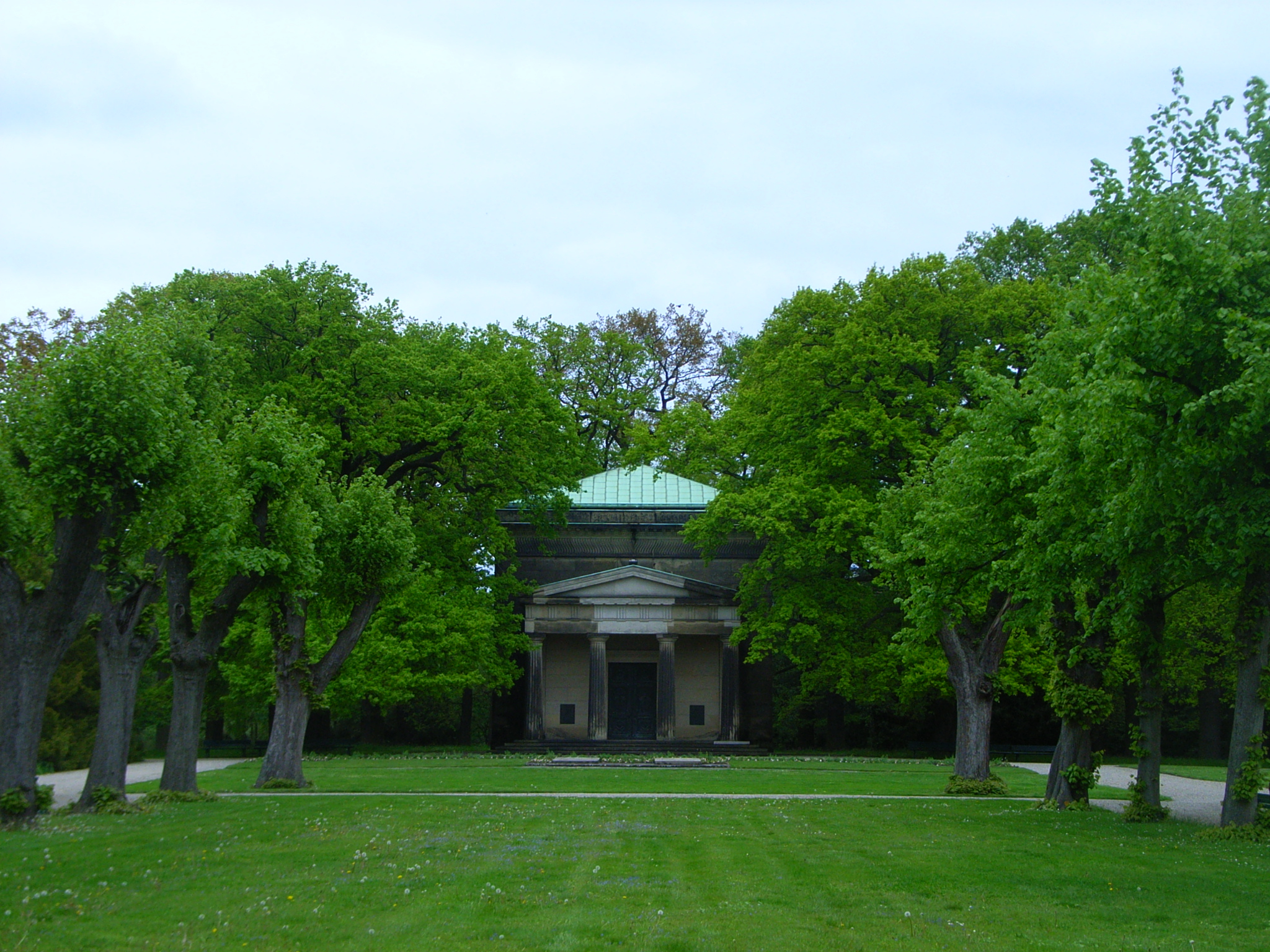
Mausoleum of Ernest Augustus, King of Hanover, in the Hill Garden. Since 1952 also burial place of King George I of Great Britain, Elector of Hanover

Work on the garden's mausoleum, also designed by Laves, lasted from 1842 to 1847; King Ernest Augustus, who died one year after completion, was interred there with his wife Queen Frederica. The mausoleum of Frederica's sister Louise, queen consort of Prussia, in the park of Charlottenburg Palace served as a model. A U-shaped grove of pedunculate oaks dating back to the 18th century was planted around the mausoleum. The architect Georg Schuster succeeded in transplanting 36 oak trees, which were already 60 years old at the time, without causing any major damage to the trees.

It was also around this time (1845 to 1846) that walls and fences were added in order to make the Hill Garden more secluded. In 1880, a larger building for the palm collection was built. Taking the form of a roughly 30-metre-tall (98 ft) palace-like structure, the greenhouse, built out of glass and steel, houses both galleries and decorative fountains and replaced the previous Palm House. Much of the garden had to be rebuilt bit by bit after British air raids destroyed much of the city in World War II. In 1952, the Garden Library – which now houses the garden's management – was rebuilt, and in 1957, further members of the Royal Family of Hanover, including King George I of Great Britain and his parents, were interred in the garden's mausoleum, after destruction of the Leine Palace and its chapel during World War II. Among them are the remains of John Frederick, Duke of Brunswick-Luneburg, his daughter Anna Sophie (1670–1672), Ernest Augustus, Elector of Brunswick-Luneburg and his wife Sophia of the Palatinate, their younger son Ernest Augustus, Duke of York and Albany and Princess Charlotte of Clarence (1819–1819), daughter of William IV of the United Kingdom. In front of the mausoleum are the graves of Ernest Augustus, Duke of Brunswick and his wife Princess Viktoria Luise of Prussia who died in 1980.

The year 2000 saw the completion of a brand new Rainforest House (Regenwaldhaus), partly as a replacement for the legendary Palm House (which was demolished in 1950) and partly for Expo 2000. It houses a tropical landscape containing plants and various species of tropical butterflies and birds that were incorporated into the environment. Further exhibits of the building include several themed gardens.

== Georgen Garden ==
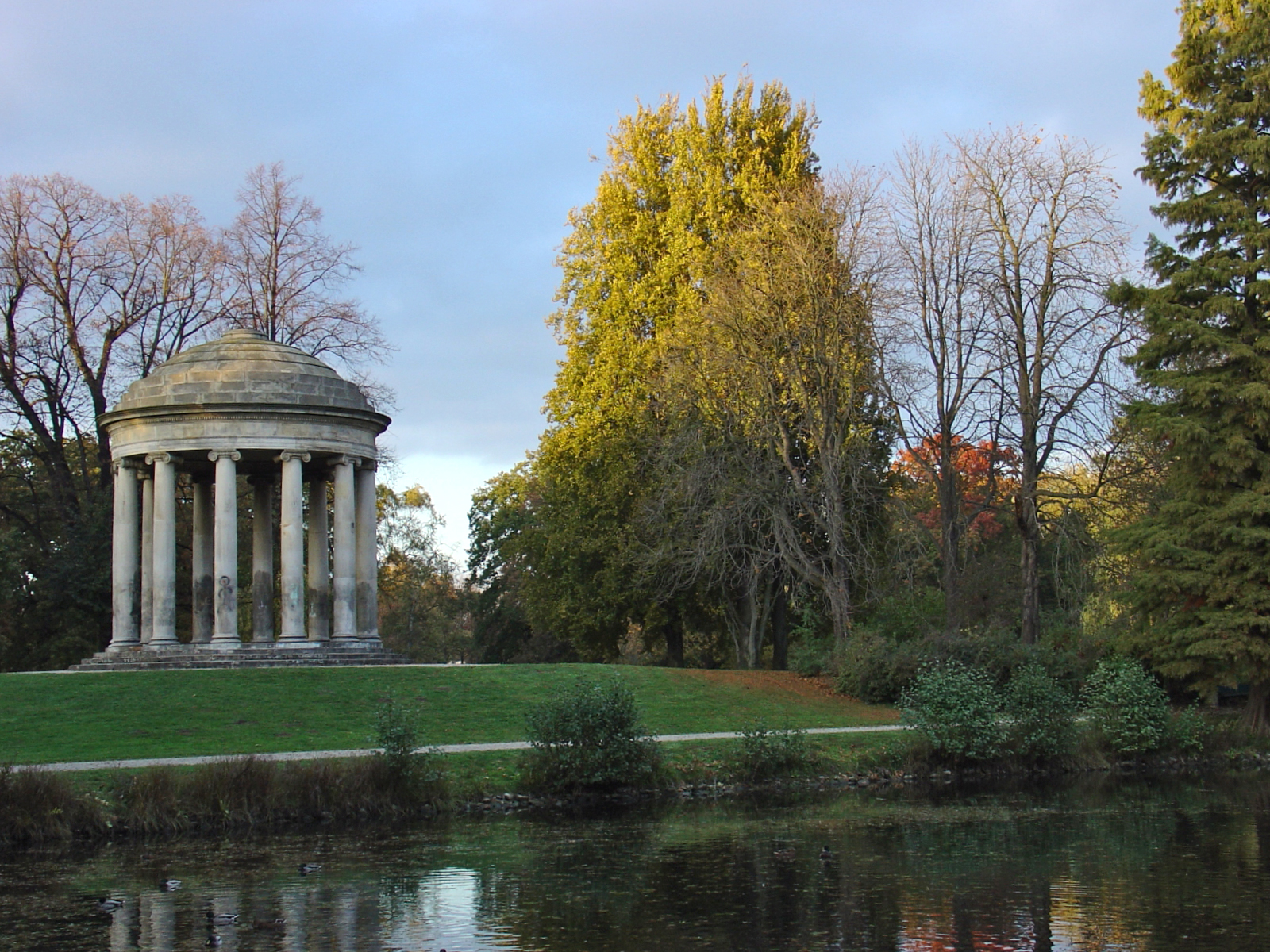
Leibniz Temple in the Georgen Garden

== Guelf Garden ==
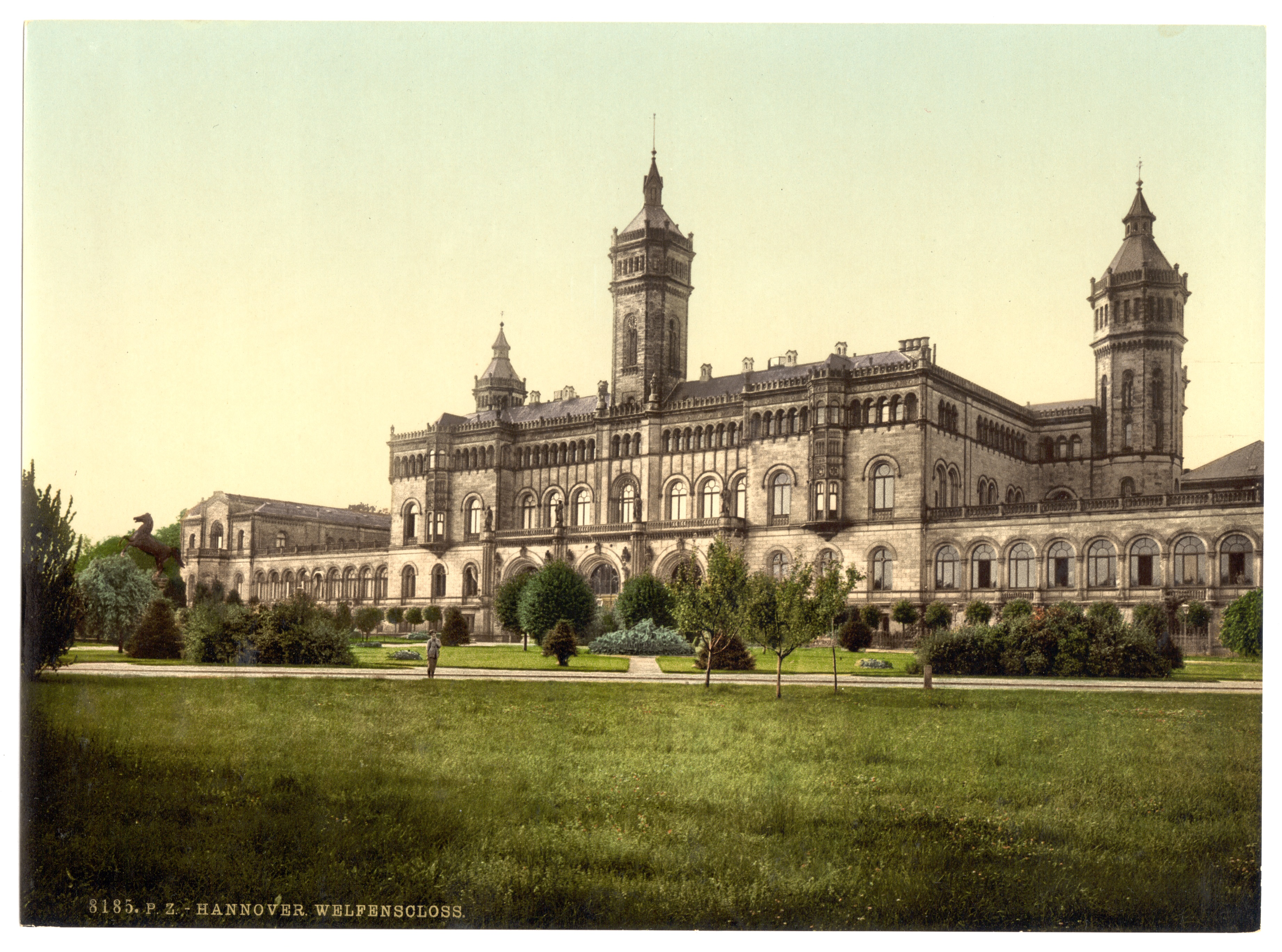
Welfenschloss palace, the central point of Guelf Garden (Welfengarten), c. 1895

Guelf Garden (Welfengarten) is part of the grounds of the University of Hannover, and the main building of the university is the gothic revival Guelf Castle (Welfenschloss) at the centre of the garden. Construction began in 1857, however in 1866 Prussia annexed Hanover before the building was completed in the following years. In front of the building, which has maintained its form to the present, is a bronze sculpture of the Lower Saxony Steed (Niedersachsenross) – the heraldic animal found on the coat of arms of Lower Saxony. Guelf Garden, like the other gardens, was destroyed during the Second World War, but it was rebuilt specifically as the campus of the university.

Although the university has been resident in the building since 1879, it was not until 1961, after both Prussian annexation and abolition of monarchy in Germany in 1918, that Ernest Augustus sold Guelf Garden to the City of Hanover while retaining ownership of the 'Prince House' (Fürstenhaus), located near the Great Garden. Built by King George I of Great Britain for his daughter Anna Louise in 1720, as of 2023 that building is used by his grandson Ernst August as his private residence. The museum in this small palace, with an elaborate furniture collection, is closed.

== Rose Garden ==
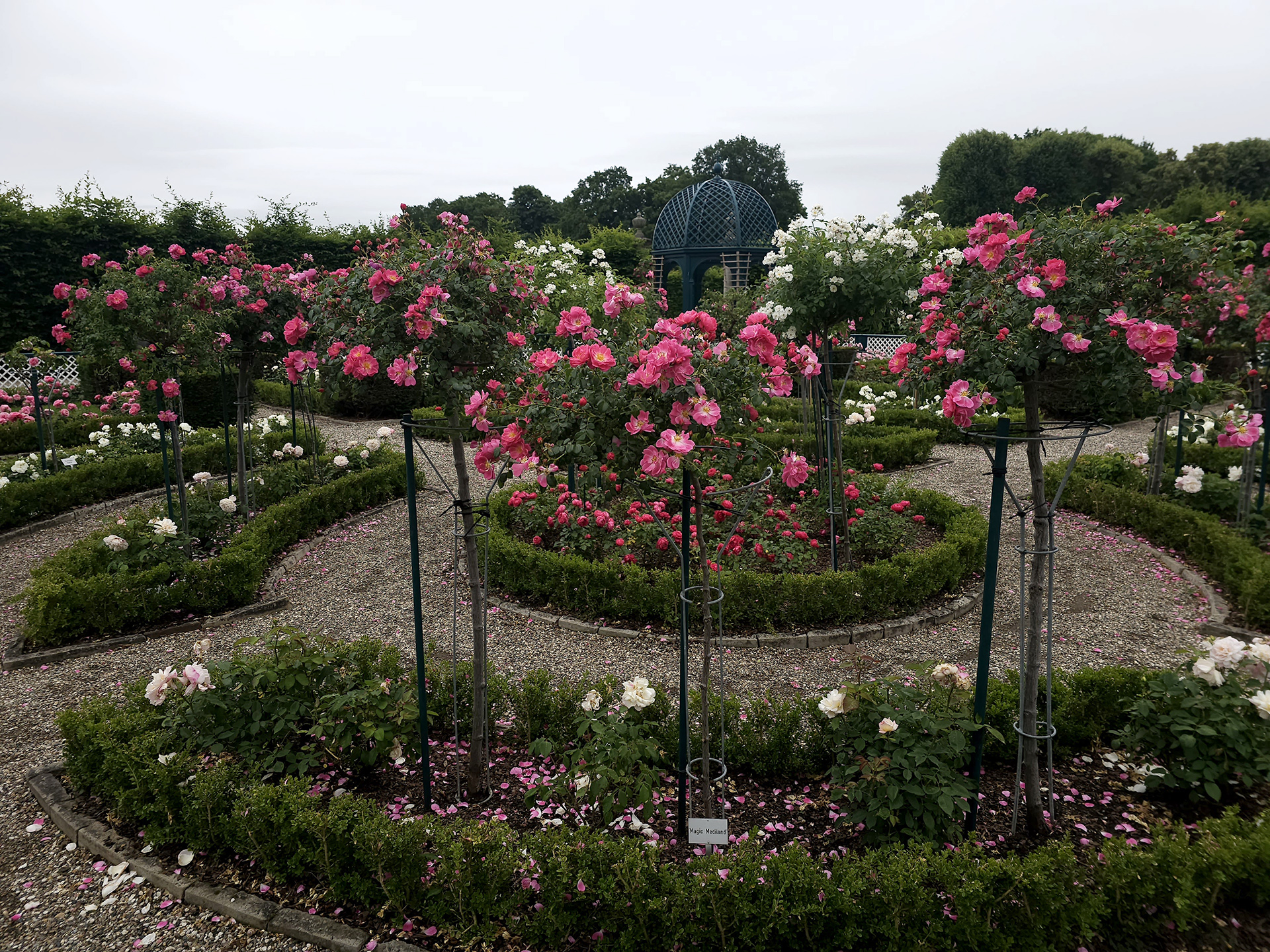
Rose garden (Niederdeutscher Rosengarten)

The Low German Rose Garden (German: Niederdeutscher Rosengarten) is one of the eight special gardens located within the central axis of the "Great Garden"(German: Großer Garten). It is situated along the main line connecting Herrenhausen Palace to the Great Fountain and is one of the thematic gardens created to reflect the historical evolution of garden design. Each of these eight gardens is enclosed by plant hedges, forming distinct garden chambers.

The current rose garden was laid out during the 1936–1937 restoration of the Großer Garten, inspired by 16th-century garden design. It replaced part of the original bosquet areas and, along with the other special gardens, serves to illustrate the development of architectural gardens from the Baroque to the modern period.

Gravel paths divide the rose garden into square sections planted with bedding roses, with boxwood cubes marking the corners. The central space, arranged in circular patterns, is planted with standard roses. The entire garden is enclosed by a low lattice fence, emphasizing its character as a secluded "garden of love." At each of the four corners, visitors will find pavilions adorned with climbing roses, providing shaded places to rest.

Approximately 650 varieties of roses are cultivated in the garden. Among them are the locally developed Herrenhausen cultivars, including Kurfürstin Sophie and King George.

== See also ==
- List of botanical gardens in Germany
