= Georgengarten =

Landscape garden in the borough of Herrenhausen of the German city Hannover

Coordinates: 52.38582°N 9.70814°E

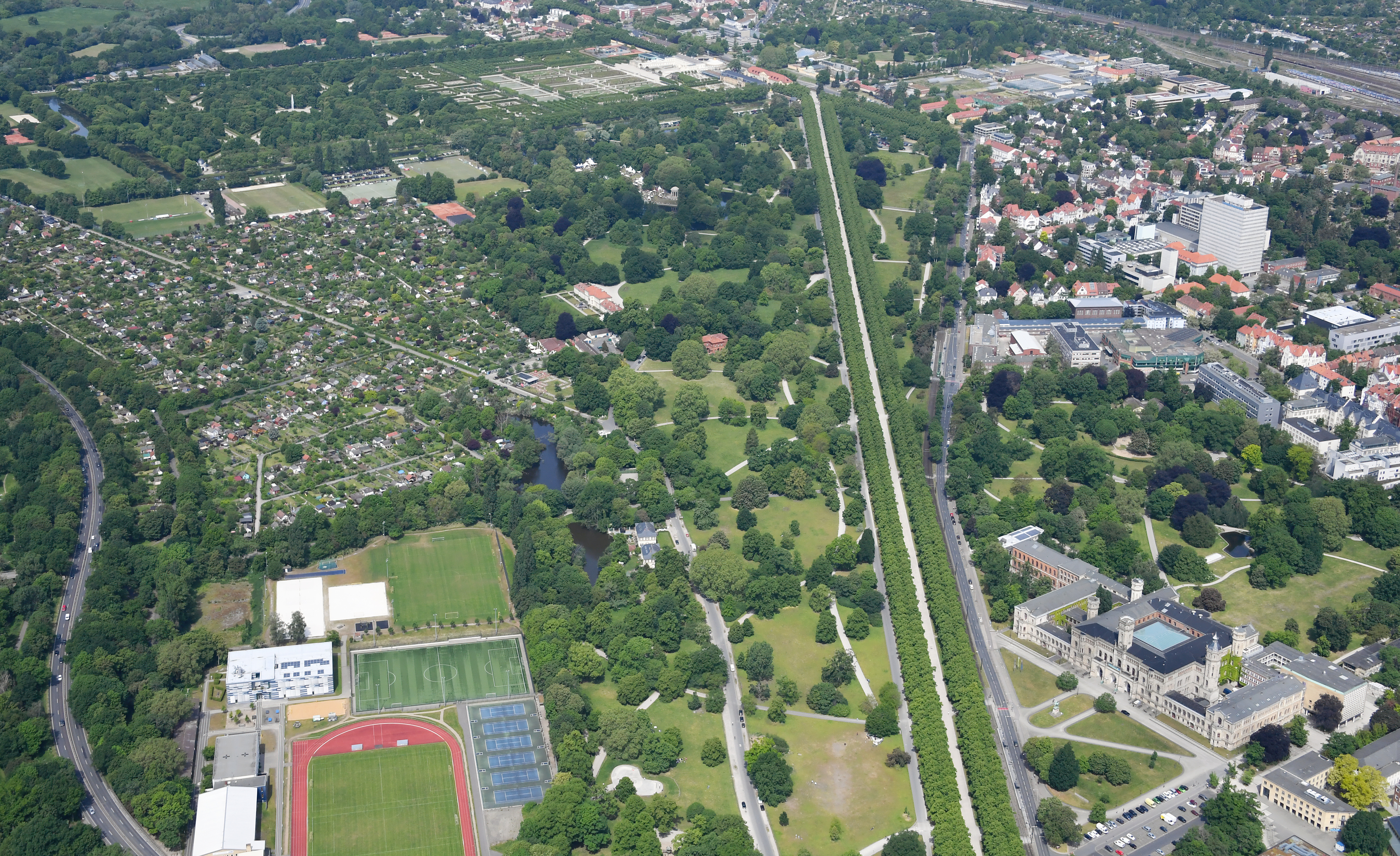
Aerial view of the Georgengarten to the left of the Herrenhäuser Allee

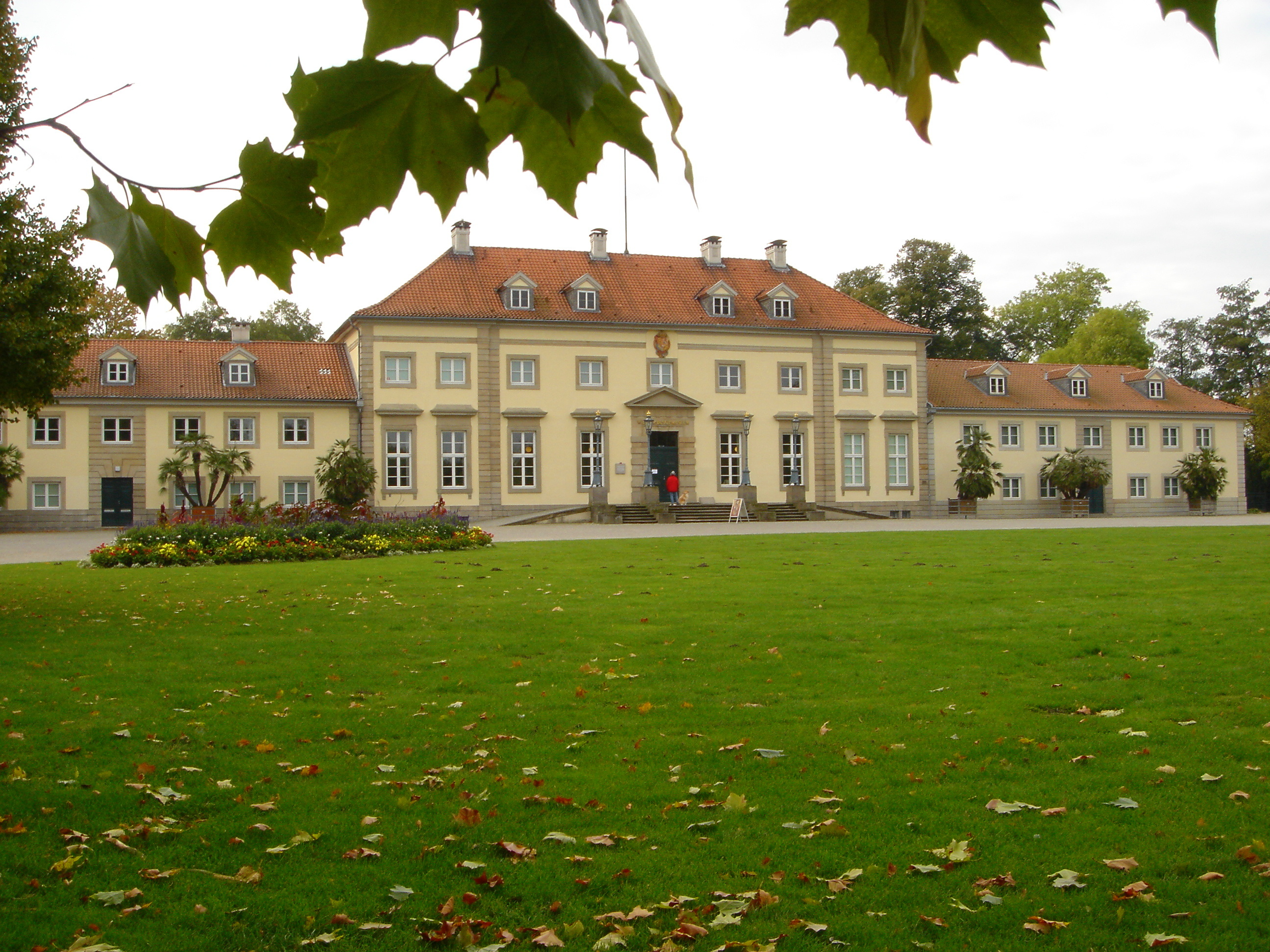
The Georgenpalais in the Georgengarten, now home of the Wilhelm Busch Museum

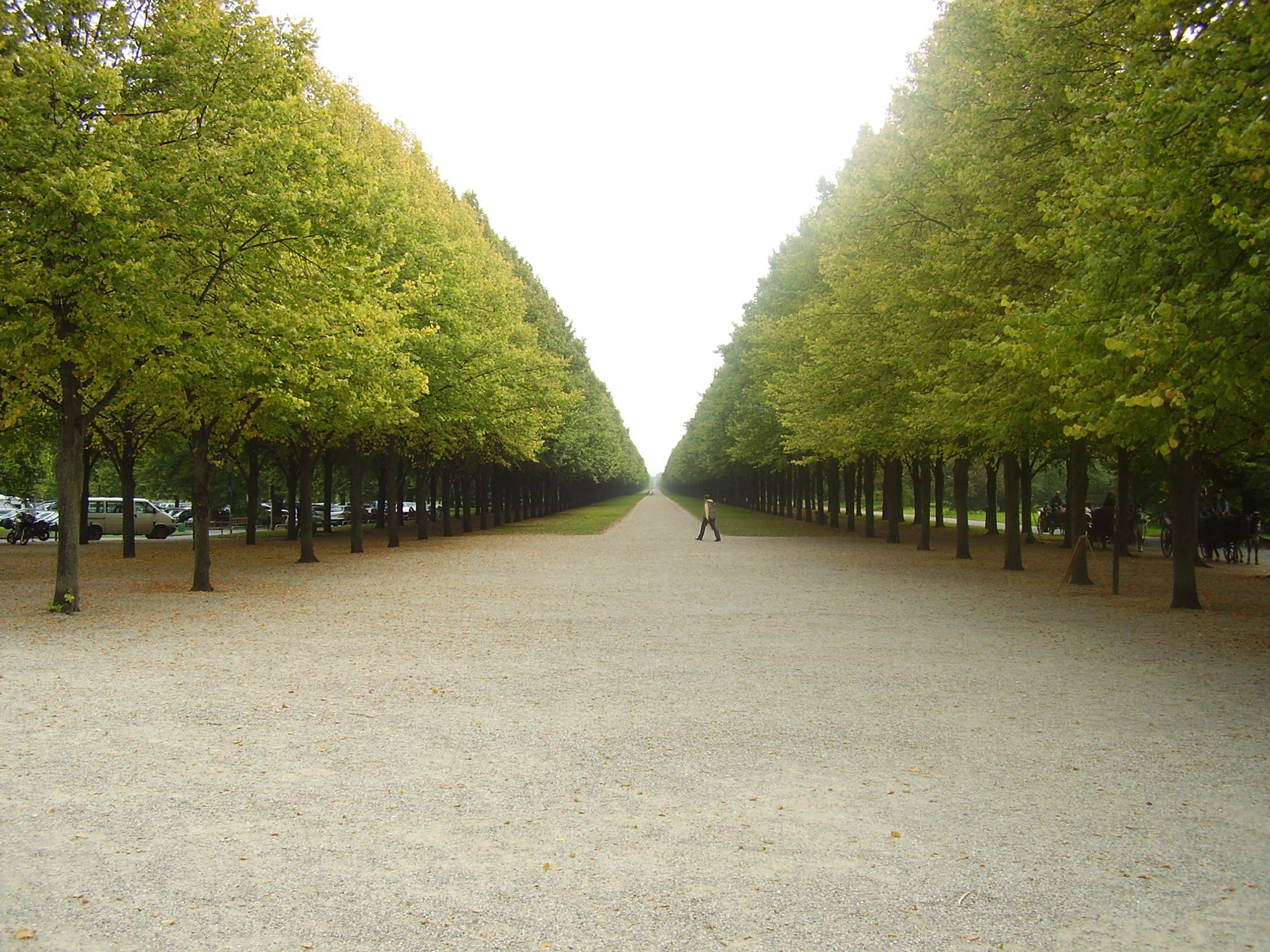
The Herrenhäuser Allee, seen from the main entrance of the Great Garden

The Leibniz Temple

The Georgengarten (German: [ˈɡeːɔʁɡŋ̍ˌɡaʁtn̩]) is a landscape garden in the northwestern borough of Herrenhausen of the German city Hanover. It is a part of Herrenhausen Gardens.

== History ==
Around 1700, country estates for several noblemen were established in the former flood plain of the river Leine. In 1726, the Herrenhäuser Allee (Herrenhausen alley) was planted just through the gardens, connecting Hanover with the royal palace and gardens of Herrenhausen in the boroughs of the city; it is almost exactly one geographical mile (1.8553 km or 1.1528 mi) long, and consists of four rows of lime trees.

In 1768 the German lieutenant-general and art collector Johann Ludwig, Reichsgraf von Wallmoden-Gimborn acquired some of these gardens and merged them into the Wallmodengarten. Between 1780 and 1782 he built his own palace there, the Wallmodenschloss (also called Wallmodenpalais) to house his antiquities collection.

In order to enlarge the royal gardens of Hanover, the Wallmoden palace and the Wallmoden garden 1817 were sold to George III, who had been King of Hanover since 1814. From 1818 on, the palace was named Georgenpalais and the gardens name changed into Georgengarten.

In 1826 the architect and engineer Georg Ludwig Friedrich Laves designed two smaller wings adjacent to the left and right side of the Wallmodenschloss. From 1828 until 1843 the formal garden was redesigned as an English style landscape garden. Former water features, canals and so on, were enlarged into a pond.

Between 1835 and 1841 the then head gardener, Christian Schaumburg, was responsible for some redesign. During these years, three bridges designed by Laves were built: 1837 the Fahrbrücke, in 1840 the Augustenbrücke, and in the same year, the Friederikenbrücke. The latter is the only remaining bridge of the three. Today it connects the Georgengarten and the Great Garden (Großer Garten) within the Herrenhausen Gardens.

At the city end of the Herrenhäuser Allee, in 1857, a gate was built after plans made by Laves. The gate separated Königsworther Platz (Königsworther square) from the alley and the Georgengarten. In the 1960s, the gate was demolished, but in 2007, a replica with some remaining original parts was placed there.

At the end of 19th century Napoleonic troops were going to cut down the whole Herrenhäuser Allee, but baker and grain dealer Johann Gerhard Helmcke (1780−1844) saved the alley by paying 3,000 Taler. To honour Helmcke's deed, a memorial stone was placed near the alley.

In 1921 the City of Hanover bought both the Georgengarten and the Georgenpalais. During World War II the Georgenpalais was damaged severely by bombs during a Royal Air Force air raid. The Georgengarten was used to grow vegetables. In post war military occupation years, a lot of seeping engine oil and fuel of the British troop vehicles damaged many of the lime trees of the old Herrenhäuser Allee. Their step-by-step restoration took until the 1970s.

Since 1949, ownership of the Georgenpalais was transferred to the Wilhelm Busch Society, a literary society named after the famous German caricaturist, painter and poet Wilhelm Busch. They later rebuilt the damaged eastern wing of the building.

== Present use ==
Today the house is used as a caricature museum and is named Wilhelm-Busch-Museum - Deutsches Museum für Karikatur und kritische Grafik. The Georgengarten now is a part of the famous Herrenhausen Gardens.

The Leibniz Temple in the park is named in honour of the German polymath Gottfried Leibniz. Originally it was erected between 1787 and 1790 at the Hanover military parade place (now called Waterlooplatz); later it was transferred to the Georgengarten. Today it is a popular venue during warm summer evenings, especially frequented by young people and students of the nearby Leibniz University Hannover.
