= Herrenhausen Palace =

Palace in Hanover

Coordinates: 52°23′28″N 9°41′52″E

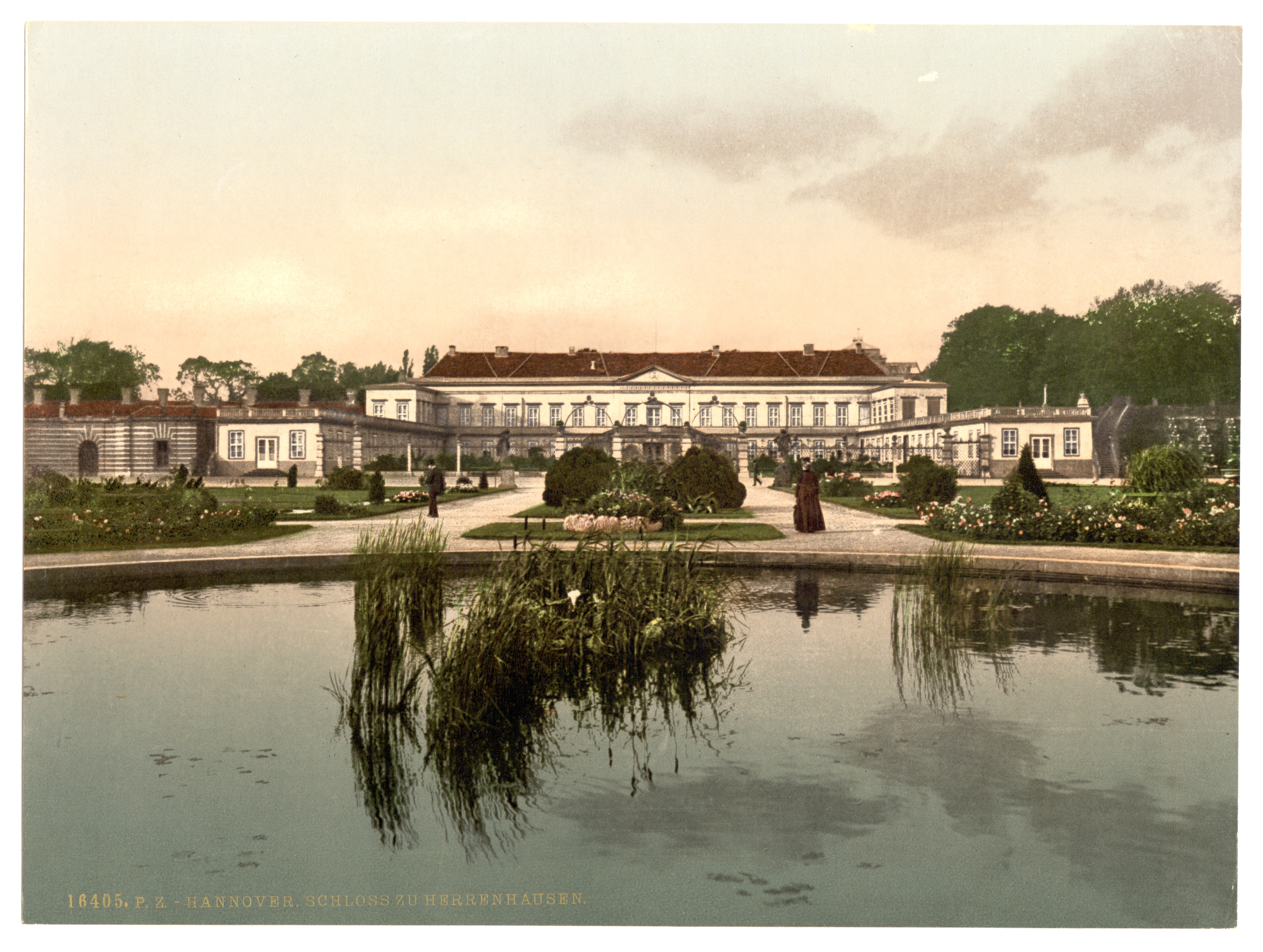
Herrenhausen Palace, Hanover, c. 1895

The reconstructed palace in 2021

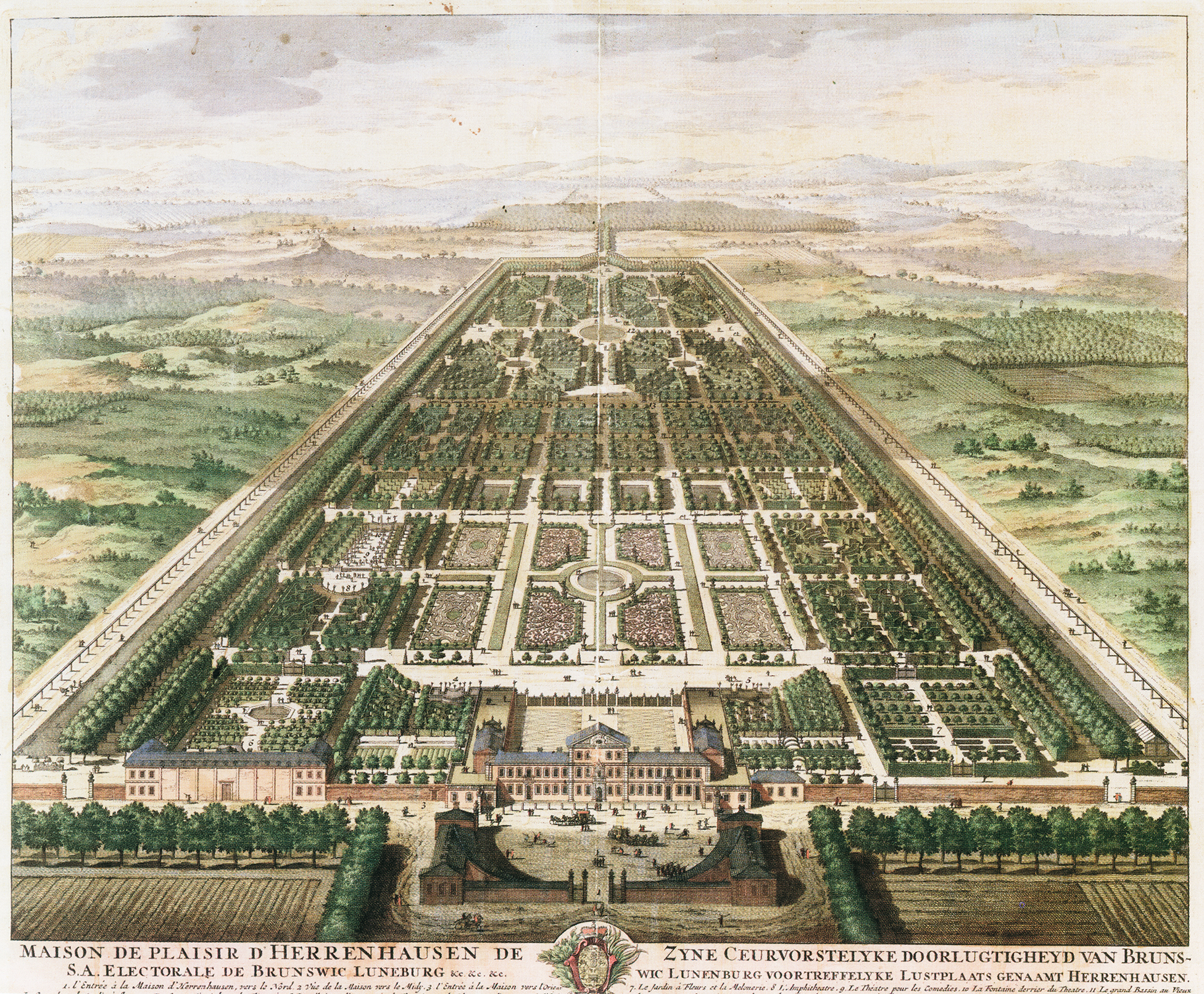
The Palace Gardens, c. 1708

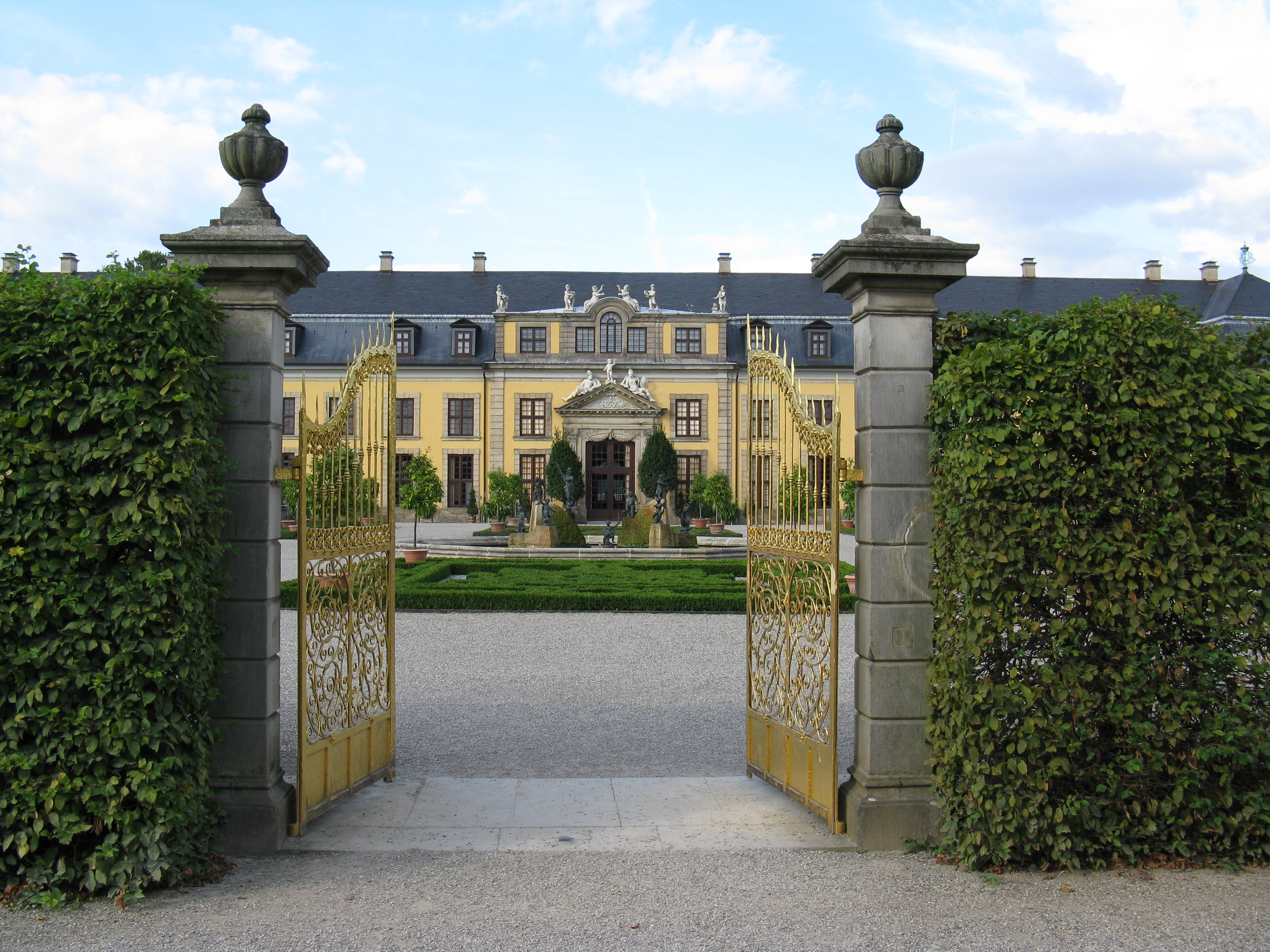
Gilded Gates and Galerie

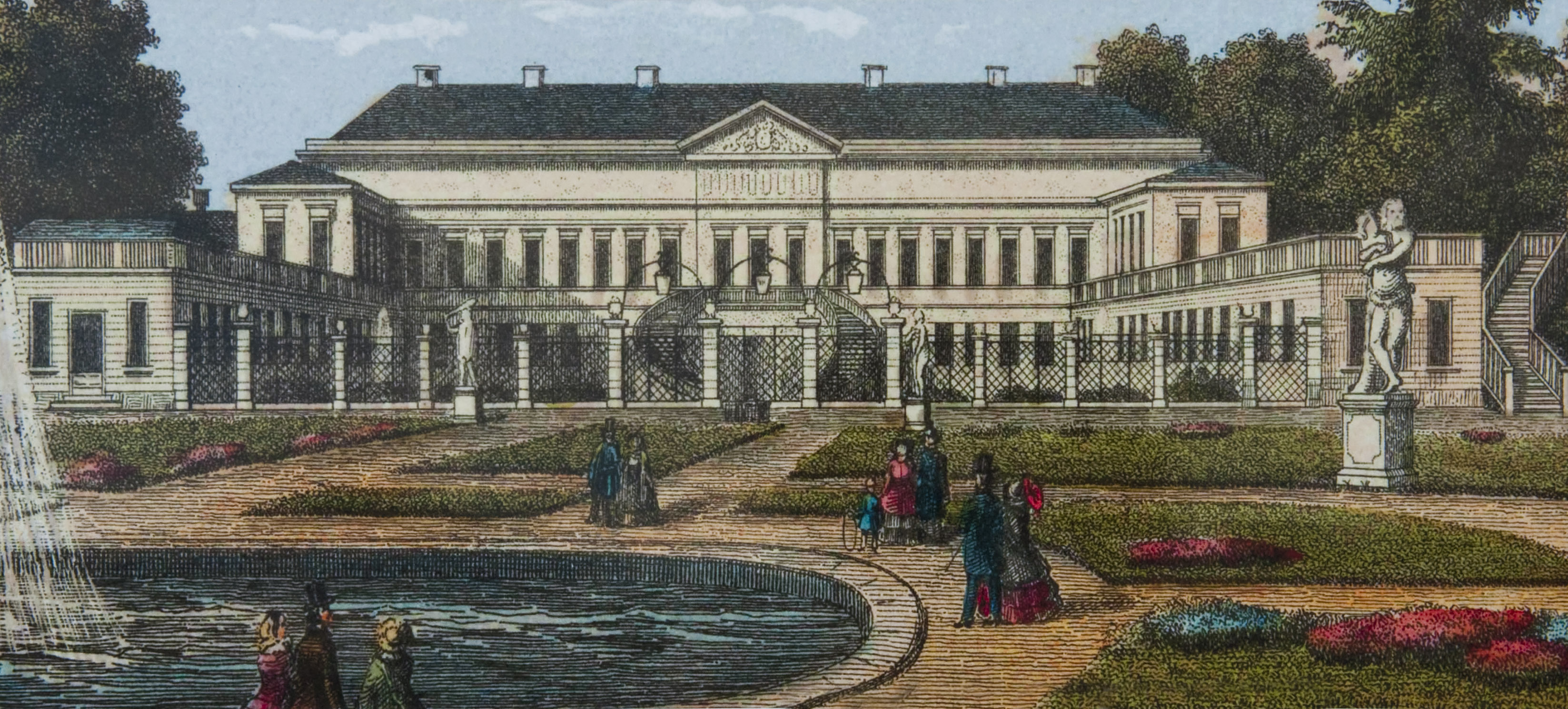
Garden facade of Herrenhausen, mid-19th century

Herrenhausen Palace (German: Schloss Herrenhausen) is a former royal summer residence of the House of Hanover in the Herrenhausen district of the German city of Hanover. It is the centrepiece of Herrenhausen Gardens. Sophia of Hanover oversaw the development of the estate in the late 1600s.

The 17th-century palace was destroyed by a Royal Air Force bombing raid in 1943 during World War II and reconstructed between 2009 and 2013. Today it houses a museum, a division of the Historisches Museum Hannover, and exhibition space.

== History ==
Originally a manor house of 1640, the building was enlarged in phases from 1676, and served as a summer retreat, located only a few kilometers outside the city from the central Leine Palace. In 1683 Sophia of Hanover commissioned the French gardener Martin Charbonnier to enlarge the garden in the manner of Versailles to form the 50-hectare (120-acre) Great Garden (Großer Garten). Sophia's husband, Ernest Augustus, Elector of Brunswick-Lüneburg, planned the retreats replacement with a large baroque palace, and began construction with the Galerie, but their son, elector George Louis, who in 1714 succeeded to the British throne as King George I, gave up the palace building project and concentrated on adding water features to the garden.

The next elector, George II of Great Britain (r. 1727–1760), planned again for a new palace in better proportion with the Great Garden, but never realized it. His successor George III (r. 1760–1820), who never visited Herrenhausen, had the palace modernised in neoclassical style by Georg Ludwig Friedrich Laves.

During World War II, Herrenhausen Palace was destroyed in a bombing raid by the Royal Air Force on 18 October 1943.

The ruins of the palace were almost completely torn down after the war; the outside staircase once leading up to the entrance was salvaged from the debris and moved next to the Orangerie building where it can be seen today. Ernest Augustus of Hanover sold his remaining property at Herrenhausen Gardens in 1961, but kept the nearby Prince House (Fürstenhaus), a small palace built in 1720 by George I for his daughter Anna Louise. It is now his grandson August of Hanover's private home.

In 2009, the city of Hanover took the decision to rebuild the palace. The Volkswagen Foundation received the plot and sponsored the reconstruction. Following extensive restoration work, the palace was reopened on 18 January 2013 in a ceremony attended by Hanoverian decedents, Beatrice and Eugenie of York, as well as August of Hanover.

The reconstructed baroque palace houses the Herrenhausen Palace Museum (Museum Schloss Herrenhausen) with a cafeteria and a bookshop, as well as exhibition and meeting spaces sponsored by the Volkswagen Foundation.

== Gardens ==
The palace's extensive gardens extending beyond the original Great Garden are an important example of baroque and later garden design and contain many significant period garden buildings. The gardens were reinstated following major damage in World War II, and became an important leisure resource for the city of Hanover, with new additions including an aquarium.

== Births, deaths and burials ==
King George II of Great Britain was born in Herrenhausen Palace in 1683. Three of his daughters were born there:

- Anne, Princess Royal and Princess of Orange
- Princess Amelia of Great Britain
- Princess Caroline of Great Britain

Ernest Augustus, Elector of Brunswick-Lüneburg, George II's grandfather, died in Herrenhausen Palace in 1698.

After World War II the remains of George I of Great Britain, along with those of his parents, were removed from the chapel of Leine Palace in Hanover and reinterred in the 19th-century Guelph mausoleum (Welfenmausoleum) in the Hill Garden at Herrenhausen.

== See also ==
- Burial places of British royalty
- House of Welf (Guelph)
- List of castles and palaces in Lower Saxony
