= Wilhelm Busch Museum =

Wilhelm Busch - German Museum of Caricature and Drawings
- Wilhelm Busch - Deutsches Museum für Karikatur und Zeichenkunst
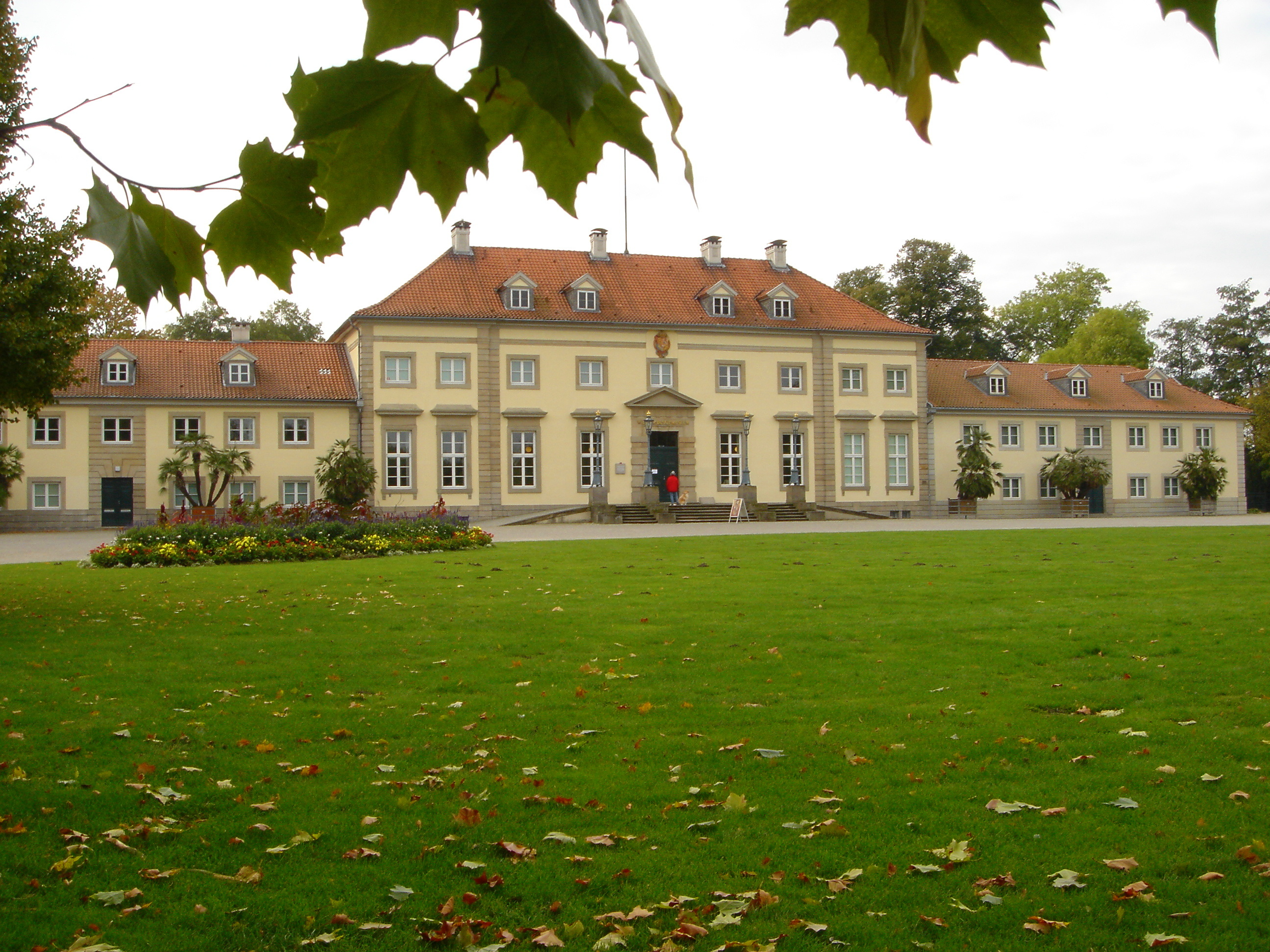
- The museum in the Georgenpalais
- Established: 1937; 89 years ago
- Location: Hanover, Lower Saxony, Germany
- Coordinates: 52°23′3.3″N 9°42′28″E
- Type: Art museum
- Website: www.sprengel-museum.com

The Wilhelm Busch Museum (German: Wilhelm Busch - Deutsches Museum für Karikatur und Zeichenkunst, "Wilhelm Busch - German Museum of Caricature and Drawings") is a museum in Hanover, Lower Saxony, Germany. It features the world's largest collection of works by Wilhelm Busch, as well as contemporary comic art, illustrations and drawings.

It is located in the Georgengarten (part of the Herrenhausen Gardens) in a palace known as the Georgenpalais, dating from around 1780. The museum is run by the Wilhelm Busch Society, which formed in 1930.

== History ==
The museum was founded in the centre of Hanover, in 1937, by the Wilhelm Busch Society. It was the first museum devoted to the Lower Saxon artist Busch. The building was destroyed by Allied bombs in 1943, although the artworks had already been evacuated. The museum reopened in 1950, initially in the Wallmodenpalais, with an extensive presentation of works by Busch as well as the first exhibition of caricatures.

As of 2010 the Wilhelm Busch Society has around 2,500 members in and outside Germany. Since 2002 the museum has also been supported by the Association of Sponsors (Verein der Förderer des Wilhelm-Busch-Museums). The city of Hanover allows the use of the historic exhibition building free of charge, and also makes an annual sponsorship contribution. Since 2000 the museum has jointly managed a cafe with the Palaisgarten, following extensive renovations of both.

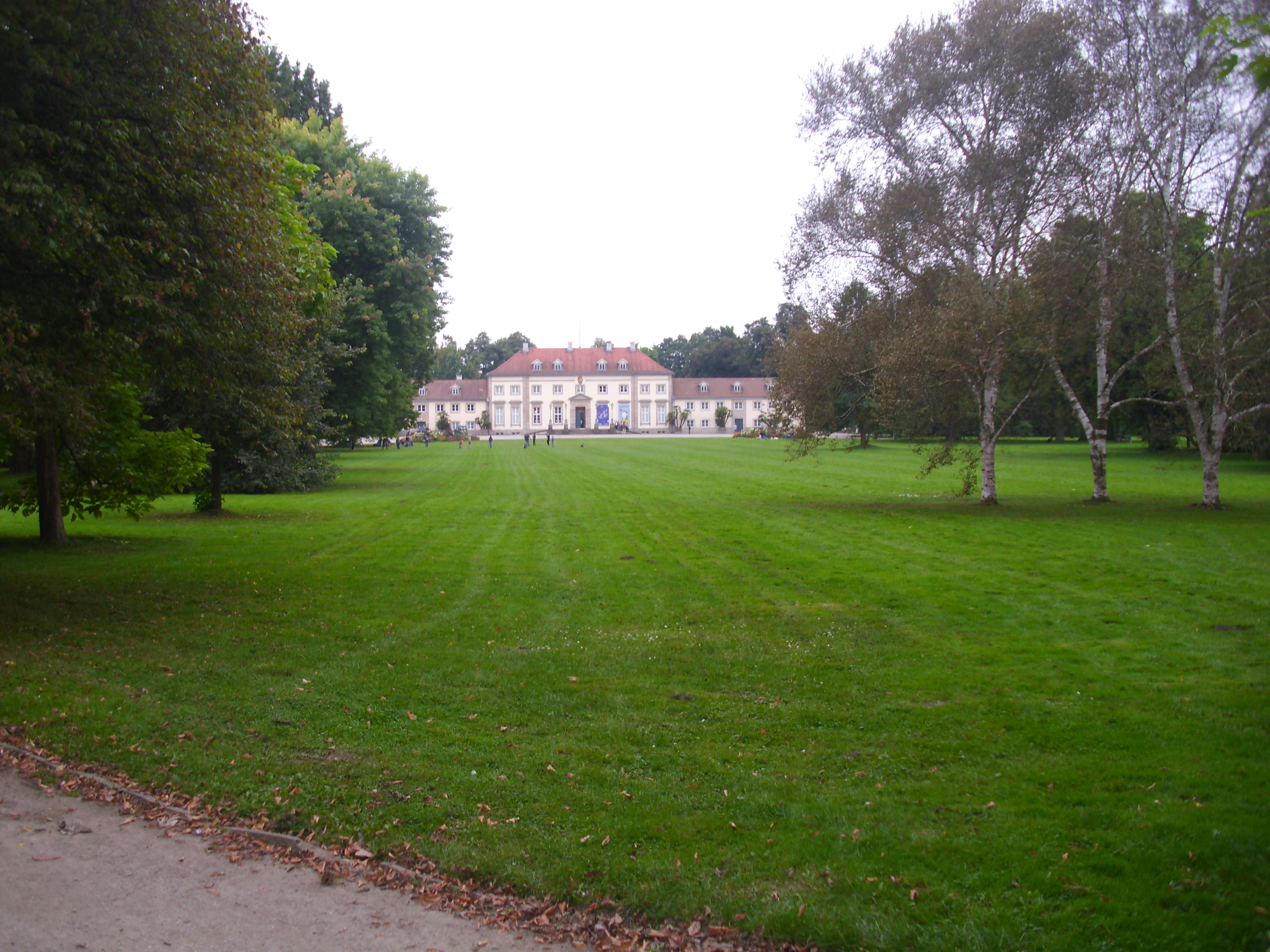
Wilhelm-Busch Museum

== Collections ==
In addition to the works by Busch, the museum owns an internationally significant collection of four centuries of satirical art, by artists including Honoré Daumier, James Gillray, Francisco de Goya, Thomas Theodor Heine, William Hogarth, Ronald Searle, Jean-Jacques Sempé, Tomi Ungerer, and A. Paul Weber. The collection has grown significantly since around 2000, with new acquisitions including 700 caricatures of Napoleon, works by the Austrian caricaturist Erich Sokol, the estate of the draughtsman Volker Kriegel, and more recently that of Friedrich Karl Waechter.

The museum owns, among other things, estates and endowments from the following artists:

- Wilhelm Busch
- Paul Flora, endowment, 370 works (1970–1972)
- Hanns Erich Köhler, estate, 4,383 works (1971)
- Volker Kriegel, estate, over 700 works (2005)
- Friedrich Karl Waechter, estate, around 3,400 works (2007)
- Ronald Searle, estate on permanent loan, around 2,200 works (2010)

== Exhibitions ==
The museum hosts changing exhibitions of historic and contemporary caricature, satirical prints, cartoons and comics, generally on a tri-monthly basis. Many exhibitions are carried out in cooperation with other European museums, both in and outside the German-speaking world. Around 150 exhibitions have been put on since 1950, featuring artists such as Carl Barks, Walt Disney, Grandville, Gottfried Helnwein, Hergé, Winsor McCay and Roland Topor, in addition to those mentioned above.
