= Leineschloss =

Palace in Hanover, seat of the parliament of Lower Saxony

Coordinates: 52°22′14″N 9°44′01″E

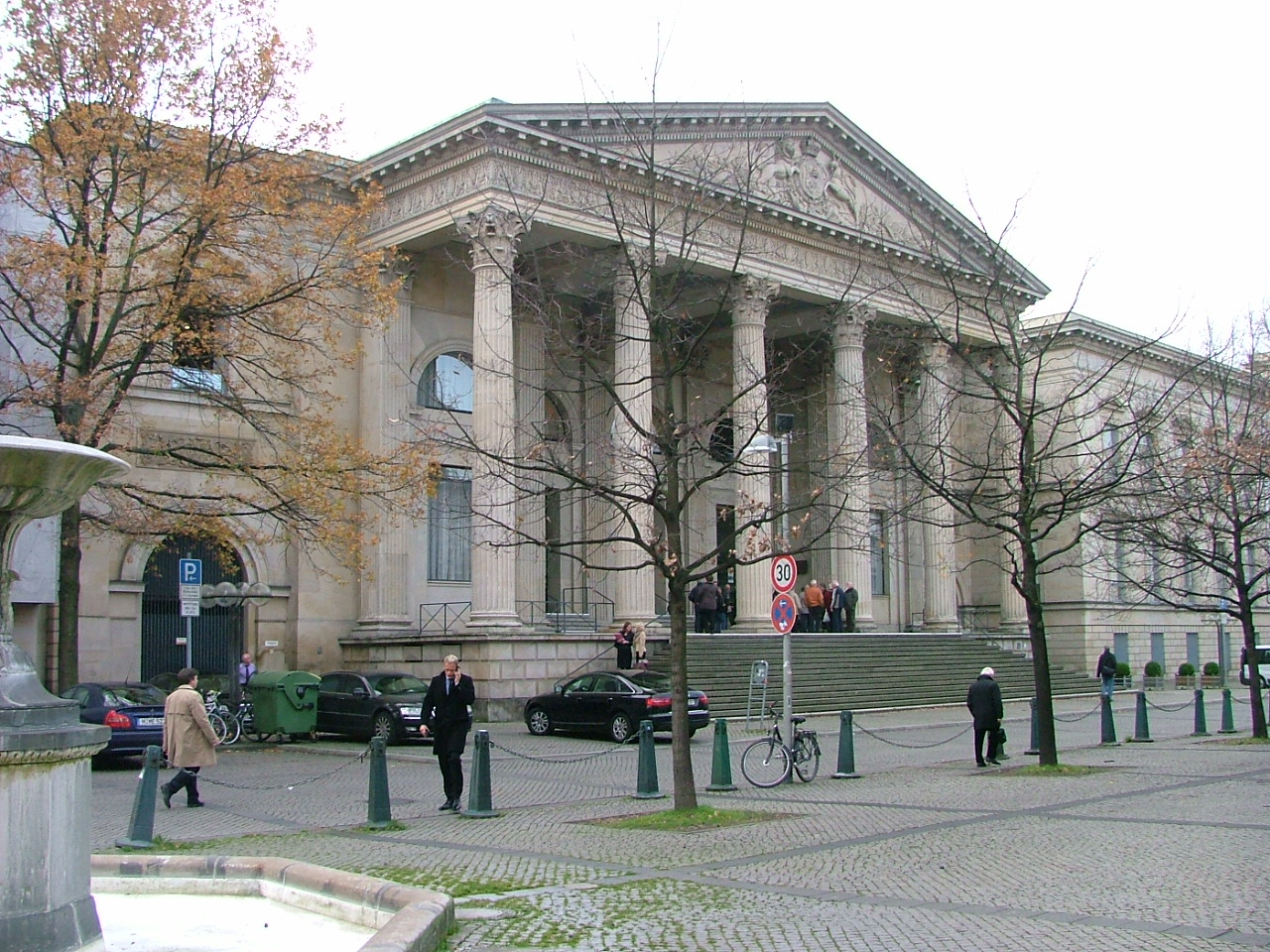
Main entrance

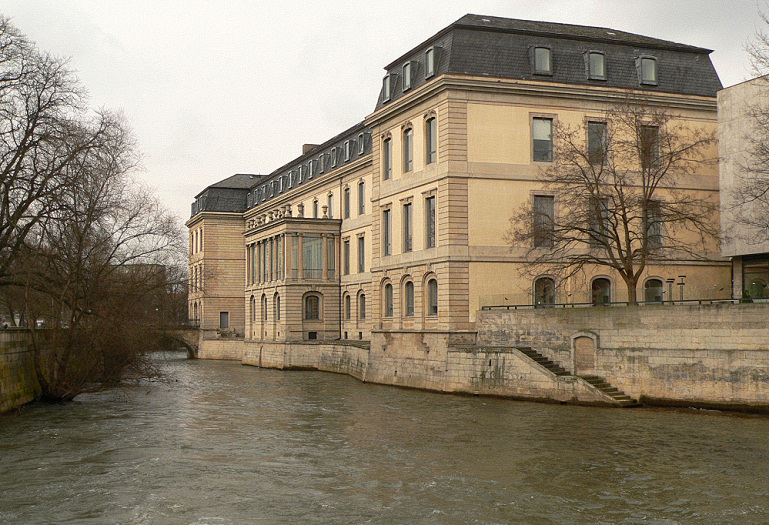
Leine river frontage

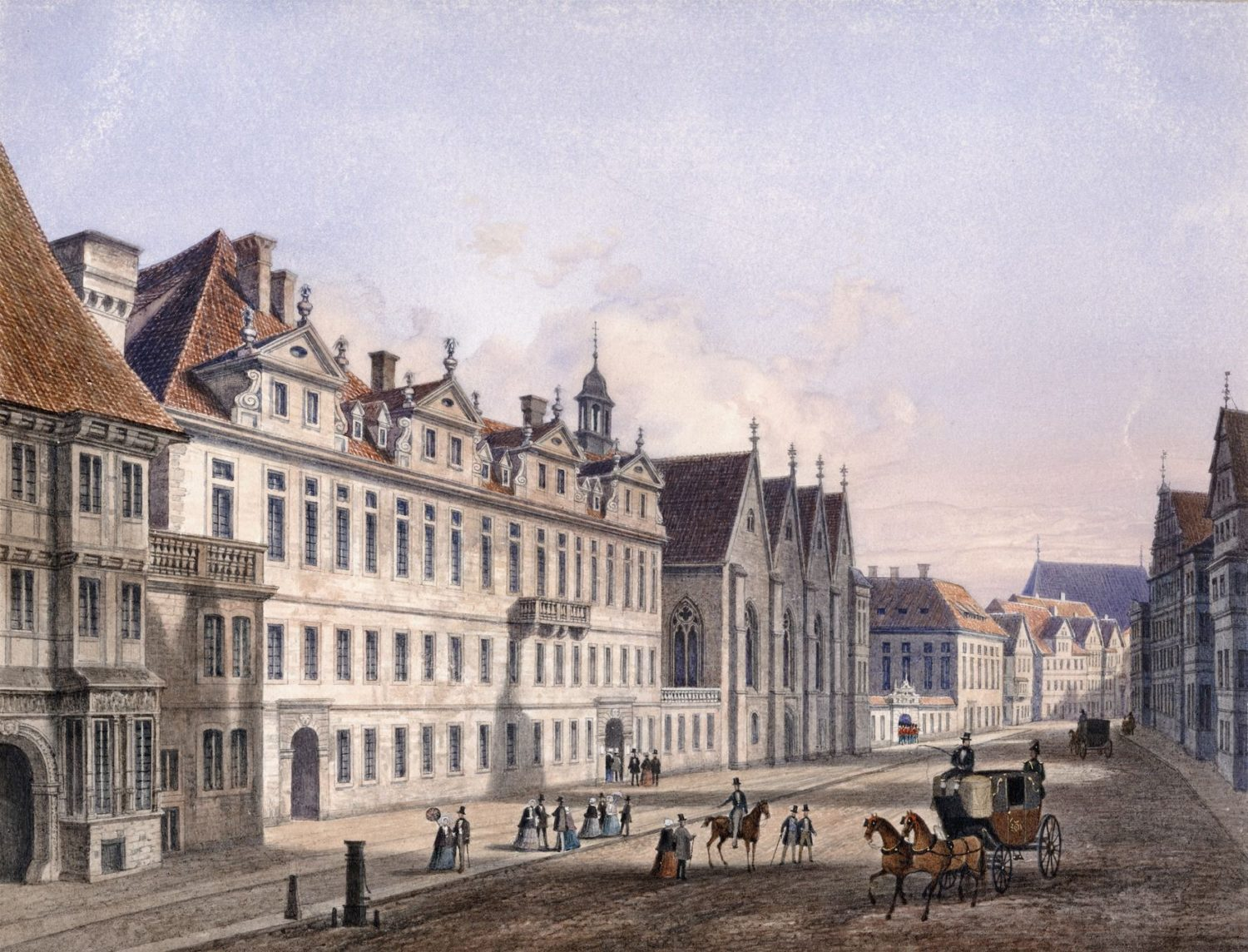
The late-renaissance palace (former Franciscan friary), before the neoclassical renovation of 1816

The Leine Palace (German: Leineschloss), situated on the Leine in Hanover, Germany, is a former residence of the Hanoverian dukes, electors and kings. It is now the seat of the parliament (Landtag) of Lower Saxony.

The first building on the site was a Franciscan friary, constructed in about 1300, which was abandoned in 1533 after the Protestant Reformation. In 1636, George, Duke of Brunswick-Lüneburg, began converting the monastery into a rather small late-renaissance palace as his residence as ruler of the Principality of Calenberg. The former monastery church served as a castle church and royal burial place. His son, Elector Ernest Augustus, had it enlarged and modernized and added a theatre in the late 17th century. The principality was elevated to the Electorate of Hanover in 1692. In 1742 the north-west wing was renewed. On May 28, 1660 Ernest Augustus' son, George I of Great Britain was born at the Leine Palace.

From 1814, the previously electoral palace was the residence of the Kingdom of Hanover. Between 1816 and 1844, the architect Georg Ludwig Friedrich Laves fully re-built the palace. The column portico with six Corinthian columns was built during this period. The youngest son of George III, Prince Adolphus, Duke of Cambridge, officiated as Viceroy of Hanover from 1816. Kings Ernest Augustus and George V were the first and only monarchs to have their main residence in the state capital and in the Leine Palace between 1837 and 1866. Although, it was intended to transfer the main seat to the Welfenschloss palace.

During World War II, the Leine Palace was completely destroyed by fire after Allied aerial raids. King George I of Great Britain was originally buried in the chapel of the palace, but his remains, along with his parents', were moved to the 19th-century mausoleum of Ernest Augustus in the Berggarten of Herrenhausen Palace after World War II. Architect Dieter Oesterlen re-built the palace between 1957 and 1962.

In August 2016 bones were found in the palace during a renovation project; it was believed that the bones were the remains of Philip Christoph von Königsmarck, the lover of the wife of the later king George I of Great Britain who was killed there in July 1694. However, subsequent tests proved that some of the bones were from animals, while the human bones came from at least five different skeletons. None have been proven to belong to Christoph.

== See also ==
- Burial places of British royalty
- Welfenschloss
