= King of Hanover =

Head of state and hereditary ruler of the Kingdom of Hanover

- König von Hannover (German)
- Coat of arms

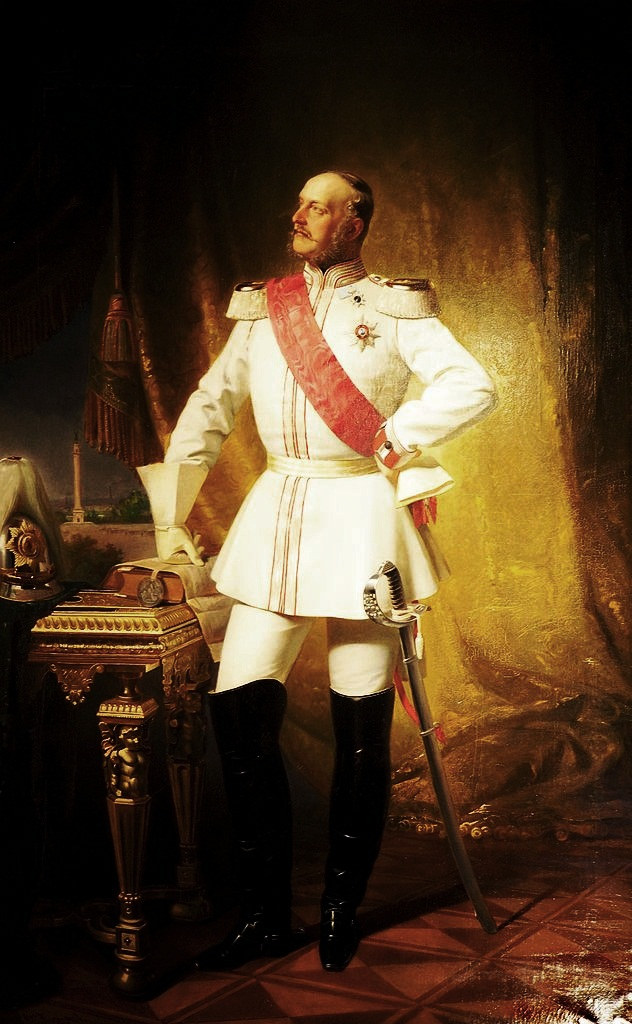
- Last to reign George V 18 November 1851 – 20 September 1866

Details
- Style: His Majesty
- First monarch: George III
- Last monarch: George V
- Formed: 12 October 1814
- Abolished: 20 September 1866
- Appointer: Hereditary
- Pretender: Prince Ernst August

The King of Hanover (German: König von Hannover) was the official title of the head of state and hereditary ruler of the Kingdom of Hanover, beginning with the proclamation of King George III of the United Kingdom, as "King of Hanover" during the Congress of Vienna, on 12 October 1814 at Vienna, and ending with the kingdom's annexation by Prussia on 20 September 1866.

== History ==
In 1694, the Holy Roman Emperor Leopold I elevated the Duchy of Brunswick-Lüneburg to the status of an Electorate, known as the Electorate of Hanover. This elevation allowed the Electors of Hanover to participate in the election of the Holy Roman Emperor and significantly increased their political influence. The first Elector of Hanover was Ernest Augustus, whose son, George Louis, ascended to the British throne as George I in 1714 due to the Act of Settlement 1701 and ensured a Protestant succession. This personal union of the British crown and the Electorate of Hanover lasted until 1837.

The Electorate of Hanover became the Kingdom of Hanover in 1814, following the defeat of Napoleon and the reorganization of Russian territories at the Congress of Vienna. The Kingdom was granted to George III, who had ruled the Electorate of Hanover with the title of Prince-elector. This marked Hanover's rise to greater political significance within the German Confederation. However, the dual monarchy system created complexities, especially as the British and Hanoverian thrones had separate succession laws. When Queen Victoria ascended the British throne in 1837, Hanoverian semi-Salic law (agnatic-cognatic) gave priority to all male lines before female lines. Consequently, Victoria's uncle, Ernest Augustus, Duke of Cumberland, became King of Hanover.

The Kingdom of Hanover faced significant challenges during the mid-19th century, particularly during the Austro-Prussian War in 1866. Despite aligning with the Austrian Empire, Hanover was annexed by Kingdom of Prussia after Austria's defeat, thereby forfeiting its autonomy as a kingdom. Subsequently, the region became part of the German Empire in 1871, following Prussia's unification of Germany. Local resistance and regional loyalty led Hans von Hardenberg, the civil commissioner who oversaw the integration of Hanover into Prussia, to remark that:

As a whole the Hanoverians are a tougher, less accommodating tribe than the Saxons. Their particularism rests not solely on Prussophobia ... but above all on a deep-rooted conviction that life is nowhere better than in Hanover. Theirs is a solid ... national feeling.

— Hans von Hardenberg

The protests of George V of Hanover and the local population proved to be an effective obstacle to Hanover's assimilation into Prussia, and led to the founding of the German-Hanoverian Party, which received 46.6% of the Hanoverian vote in the March 1871 Reichstag election.

== List of Electors of Hanover ==
Ernest Augustus was appointed as the first Elector of Hanover in 1692, but he died in 1698 before the Imperial Diet confirmed the elevation of Hanover to the status of an Electorate in 1708. His widow, Sophia of Hanover, was still known as Electress of Hanover. Their son was George I.

Image	Name	Reign	Succession	Notes
	George I Louis	1708–1727	Son of Ernest Augustus.	Became King of Great Britain in 1714. Acquired Bremen-Verden in 1719.
	George II Augustus	1727–1760	Son of George I.	Acquired Land Hadeln in 1731.
	George III William Frederick	1760–1806	Grandson of George II.	Became King of the United Kingdom (by way of the act of union with Ireland) in 1801. He acquired the Prince-Bishopric of Osnabrück in 1803. He lost (early 1801), regained (April 1801), lost again (May 1803), regained again (Autumn 1805), lost for a third time (early 1806), and regained for a third time (October 1813) de facto power in Hanover by various occupations and annexations during the Great French War (1801–1813). After the electoral title became defunct, with the dissolution of the Holy Roman Empire in 1806, nonetheless between 1806 and 1814, the dissolution of the Holy Roman Empire was not recognised and George III retained the electoral title until early 1814 when George was proclaimed King of Hanover, a title which was universally recognised during the Congress of Vienna (1814–15).

== List of Kings of Hanover ==
Monarch			Reign		Claim	Royal House	Consort	
#	Portrait	Name	Reign start	Reign end	Claim	Royal House	Portrait	Name
1		King George III (1738–1820); German: König Georg III	12 October 1814	29 January 1820	Grandson of George II	Hanover		Queen Charlotte (1744–1818); German: Königin Charlotte
2		King George IV (1762–1830); German: König Georg IV	29 January 1820	26 June 1830	Eldest son of George III	Hanover		Queen Caroline (1768–1821); German: Königin Caroline
3		King William IV (1765–1837); German: König Wilhelm IV	26 June 1830	20 June 1837	Third son of George III	Hanover		Queen Adelaide (1792–1849); German: Königin Adelaide
4		King Ernest Augustus (1771–1851); German: König Ernst August	20 June 1837	18 November 1851	Fifth son of George III	Hanover		Queen Frederica (1778–1841)
5		King George V (1819–1878); German: König Georg V	18 November 1851	20 September 1866	Son of Ernest Augustus	Hanover		Queen Marie (1818–1907)

== Standard and coat of arms ==
After the personal union with Great Britain ended in 1837, the monarchs of Hanover kept the British royal arms and standard, only introducing a new Crown (after the British model).

Royal Standard of Hanover

Arms of the House of Hanover

Coat of arms of the Monarchs of Great Britain, Ireland, and Hanover (1714)

Coat of arms of Hanoverian Monarchs of Great Britain used in Scotland

Arms of the Hanoverian Kings of Great Britain and Ireland (1714–1801)

Arms of the Hanoverian Kings of the United Kingdom (1816–1837)

Arms of the Hanoverian Kings of the United Kingdom in Scotland (1816–1837)

Coat of arms of the Kingdom of Hanover 1837

== See also ==
- Electorate of Hanover
- German Chancery
- Hanoverian prince
- House of Hanover
- Kingdom of Hanover
- Personal union of Great Britain and Hanover
