= Hanoverian prince =

List of princes from George III to the Kingdom of Hanover

This is a list of Hanoverian princes from the accession of George III to the throne of the Kingdom of Hanover in 1814. Individuals holding the title of prince will usually also be styled "His Royal Highness" (HRH). The wife of a Hanoverian prince will usually take the title and style of her husband. Despite Hanover's annexation by Prussia in 1866, male-line descendants of George III continue to style themselves as a prince or princess of Hanover.

The title Prince of Hanover and the use of the style "Royal Highness" has generally been restricted to the following persons:

- the legitimate sons of a Hanoverian Sovereign,
- the legitimate male line descendants of a Hanoverian Sovereign

== List of Hanoverian princes since 1814 ==
Prince of Hanover by the sovereign
Prince of Hanover from birth
(†) - In Letters Patent dated 20 November 1917, King George V restricted the title of Prince to the children of the sovereign, the children of the sovereign's sons, and the eldest living son of the eldest son of the Prince of Wales.
(‡) - By an Order in Council dated 28 March 1919, as authorized by the Titles Deprivation Act 1917, King George V suspended the British peerage titles, princely dignities and honours of those who sided with Germany in World War I.
- Title in the Kingdom of Hanover
- Title in the United Kingdom

List of Hanoverian Princes
Name	Born	Died	Royal lineage	Notes
(Kingdom of Hanover) Crown Prince George (United Kingdom) The Prince of Wales later, King George IV	1762	1830	1st son of George III	Title held from father's accession to own accession in 1820. Born a Prince of the United Kingdom. Prince Regent of Hanover and the United Kingdom from 5 November 1811 to accession in 1820.
(Kingdom of Hanover) Prince Frederick (United Kingdom) The Duke of York and Albany	1763	1827	2nd son of George III	Title held from father's accession to death. Born a Prince of the United Kingdom. Crown Prince of Hanover from 1820 to death.
(Kingdom of Hanover) Prince William (United Kingdom) The Duke of Clarence and St. Andrews later, King William IV & I	1765	1837	3rd son of George III	Title held from father's accession to own accession in 1830. Born a Prince of the United Kingdom. Crown Prince of Hanover from 1827 to his accession.
(Kingdom of Hanover) Prince Edward (United Kingdom) The Duke of Kent and Strathearn	1767	1820	4th son of George III	Title held from father's accession to death. Born a Prince of the United Kingdom.
(Kingdom of Hanover) Prince Ernest Augustus (United Kingdom) The 1st Duke of Cumberland and Teviotdale later, King Ernest Augustus	1771	1851	5th son of George III	Title held from father's accession to own accession in 1837. Born a Prince of the United Kingdom. Crown Prince of Hanover from 1830 to his own accession.
(Kingdom of Hanover) Prince Augustus Frederick (United Kingdom) The Duke of Sussex	1773	1843	6th son of George III	Title held from father's accession to death. Born a Prince of the United Kingdom.
(Kingdom of Hanover) Prince Adolphus (United Kingdom) The 1st Duke of Cambridge	1774	1850	7th son of George III	Title held from father's accession to death. Born a Prince of the United Kingdom.
(Kingdom of Hanover) Prince George (United Kingdom) The 2nd Duke of Cumberland and Teviotdale later, King George V	1819	1878	Only son of King Ernest Augustus & Grandson of King George III	Title held from birth to own accession in 1851. Born a Prince of the United Kingdom. Styled The Duke of Cumberland and Teviotdale till death. Head of the House of Hanover from 18 February 1851 until his death.
(Kingdom of Hanover) Prince George (United Kingdom) The 2nd Duke of Cambridge	1819	1904	Only son of Prince Adolphus & Grandson of King George III	Title held from birth until the 20 September 1866 annexation of the Kingdom of Hanover. Born a Prince of the United Kingdom. Styled The Duke of Cambridge from 8 May 1850 till death.
(Kingdom of Hanover) Prince Ernest Augustus (United Kingdom) The 3rd Duke of Cumberland and Teviotdale	1845	1923	Only son of King George V & Gt-grandson of King George III	Prince of the United Kingdom from birth until 20 November 1917(†). Duke of Cumberland and Teviotdale from 12 March 1878 until 28 March 1919(‡). Head of the House of Hanover from 12 June 1878 until his death. Crown Prince of Hanover from birth until the 20 September 1866 annexation of the Kingdom of Hanover.
(Kingdom of Hanover) Prince George William (United Kingdom) Prince George William	1880	1912	1st son of Crown Prince Ernest Augustus & 2xGt-grandson of King George III	Title held from birth to death. Born a Prince of the United Kingdom.
(Kingdom of Hanover) Prince Christian (United Kingdom) Prince Christian	1885	1901	2nd son of Crown Prince Ernest Augustus & 2xGt-grandson of King George III	Title held from birth to death. Born a Prince of the United Kingdom.
(United Kingdom) Prince Ernest Augustus	1887	1953	3rd son of Crown Prince Ernest Augustus & 2xGt-grandson of King George III	Prince of the United Kingdom from birth until 20 November 1917(†). heir to the title Duke of Cumberland and Teviotdale from 30 January 1923 until his death(‡). Duke of Brunswick from 1 November 1913 until the 8 November 1918 abolition of the German monarchy Head of the House of Hanover from 30 January 1923 until his death.
(United Kingdom) Prince Ernest Augustus	1914	1987	1st son of Prince Ernest Augustus, Duke of Brunswick & 3xGt-grandson of King George III	Prince of the United Kingdom from 17 June 1914 until 20 November 1917(†). heir to the title Duke of Cumberland and Teviotdale from 30 January 1953 until his death(‡). Additionally, Prince of Brunswick from birth until the 8 November 1918 abolition of the German monarchy; Head of the House of Hanover from 30 January 1953 until his death.
(United Kingdom) Prince George William	1915	2006	2nd son of Prince Ernest Augustus, Duke of Brunswick & 3xGt-grandson of King George III	Prince of the United Kingdom from birth until 20 November 1917(†). Additionally, Prince of Brunswick from birth until the 8 November 1918 abolition of the German monarchy.

== Crown Prince of Hanover ==
Picture	Name	Heir of	Birth	Became Heir to the Throne	Created Crown Prince of Hanover	Ceased to be Crown Prince of Hanover	Death	Other titles while Crown Prince of Hanover	Crown Princess of Hanover
	George Augustus Frederick later George IV	George III	12 August 1762	12 October 1814		29 January 1820 became King	26 June 1830	Prince Regent; Prince of Wales	Princess Caroline of Brunswick
	George Frederick Alexander Charles Ernest Augustus later George V	Ernest Augustus	27 May 1819	20 June 1837		18 November 1851 became King	12 June 1878	None	Princess Marie of Saxe-Altenburg
	Ernest Augustus William Adolphus George Frederick	George V	21 September 1845	18 November 1851		20 September 1866; Hanover annexed by Prussia	14 November 1923	None	Unmarried during tenure as Crown Prince

== See also ==
- Kingdom of Hanover
- Electorate of Hanover
- House of Hanover
- History of Hanover
- Personal union of Great Britain and Hanover
