= Personal union of Great Britain and Hanover =

Personal union of the British and Hanoverian thrones (1714-1837)

Great Britain-Hanover
- 1714–1837
- Coat of arms of the United Kingdom (1816-1837)

- Map of Great Britain (dark green), Ireland and Hanover (light green) in 1789
- Status: Personal union
- Capital: London and Hanover
- King
  - 1714–1727: George I
  - 1727–1760: George II
  - 1760–1820: George III
  - 1820–1830: George IV
  - 1830–1837: William IV
- Historical era: Modern period
  - Established: 1714
  - Disestablished: 1837
Preceded by	Succeeded by
Kingdom of Great Britain; Electorate of Hanover	United Kingdom of Great Britain and Ireland; Kingdom of Hanover

The personal union between Great Britain and Hanover existed from 1714 to 1837. During this time, the Elector of Braunschweig-Lüneburg or King of Hanover was also King of Great Britain. With the Act of Settlement in 1701, the English Parliament created the basis for the Protestant succession of the House of Hanover to the throne in the Kingdom of England, later the Kingdom of Great Britain. Different succession rules led to the dissolution of the personal union.

== History ==
=== House of Hanover ===
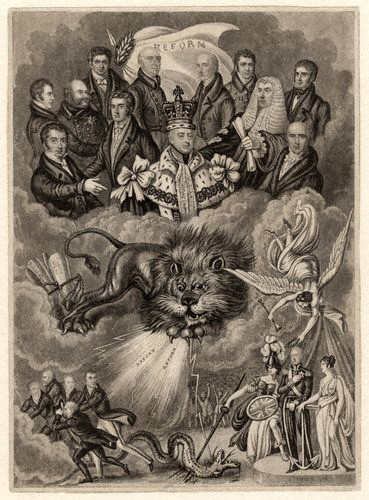
Political cartoon supporting the Reform Act: William IV sits above the clouds, surrounded by Whig politicians; below, Britannia and the British Lion cause the Tories (Ernest second from left) to flee.

After the death of Queen Anne of Great Britain, who had no descendants, the Elector of Braunschweig-Lüneburg, Georg Ludwig, inherited the British royal crown in 1714 as the closest Protestant relative in accordance with the Act of Settlement. Through this personal union, Georg Ludwig connected Great Britain with the German Electorate, which thus became one of the most powerful in the Holy Roman Empire. However, Hanover was to retain its independence, which is why the state treasury and government affairs remained separate. Electoral Hanover was administered and governed by the German Chancery in London and the Hanover minister there as well as the Privy Council in Hanover, who consulted with the ruler and carried out his instructions. Only Georg Ludwig and his son Georg August still traveled to the Electorate. The personal union only ended in 1837 with the accession of Queen Victoria to the throne, since in the Kingdom of Hanover, the successor state to the Electorate of Braunschweig-Lüneburg, only male descendants could inherit the throne according to the Salian law of succession. Therefore, control in Hanover passed to Victoria's uncle, Ernst August, Duke of Cumberland.

Lacking emotional ties to Hanover and never visiting the region, Robert Walpole prioritized British interests over Hanoverian ones and avoided close relationships with Hanoverian ministers. Following Walpole, Henry Pelham maintained similar policies until his death in 1754. Newcastle and Pitt adopted more interventionist stances which led to the Kingdom of Great Britain aligning more closely with Hanoverian interests. The Whig ministries generally supported the Hanoverian connection and interventionist foreign policies, while the Tory perspective offered a coherent critique of such approaches, often misrepresented as xenophobic. George III's ascension in 1760 marked a shift towards non-interventionist policies.

=== George III ===
The relationship between George III and Hanover underwent significant changes, marked by the king's evident preference for his British identity and obligations over his Hanoverian connections. As a young prince, George III expressed disdain for his grandfather's favouritism towards Hanover, referring to it disparagingly. Upon his accession in 1760, George III emphasized his British origins and declared himself "genuinely British," a sentiment that many historians argue marked a shift away from the importance of the dynastic union with Hanover. This separation is evident in his decisions during major international crises, where he prioritized European peace over the welfare of Hanover. For example in 1761, under the influence of his advisor Bute, George III initiated peace negotiations with France, acknowledging that this would cause suffering for his German subjects. He justified this by expressing that his love for Britain was superior to any private interest, including Hanover. He rejected rumours about abandoning Hanover and illustrated his concern through actions like establishing an agricultural academy and ensuring the education of his sons included Hanoverian elements. Unlike his predecessor, George III did not pursue territorial expansion for Hanover, recognizing the changed geopolitical landscape post-Seven Years' War, which rendered such ambitions impractical.

=== End of personal union ===
The period from 1815 to 1837 marked a significant rift in the relationship between Britain and Hanover. During this time, Britain and Hanover's political and economic interests often diverged and despite sharing a monarch, the two regions operated increasingly independently. The death of William IV on 20 June 1837, without legitimate heirs, ended the Personal Union as the British crown passed to Queen Victoria while Hanover's crown went to Ernest Augustus. This transition occurred smoothly, reflecting a growing separation between British and Hanoverian political trajectories. Ernest Augustus, known for his reactionary policies, abolished Hanover's constitution upon his ascension, further distancing the two regions politically. The subsequent birth of Edward VII solidified the separation, as the prospect of a unified British-Hanoverian crown diminished, leaving the Kingdom of Hanover to navigate its path increasingly detached from British influence.

== Monarchs ==
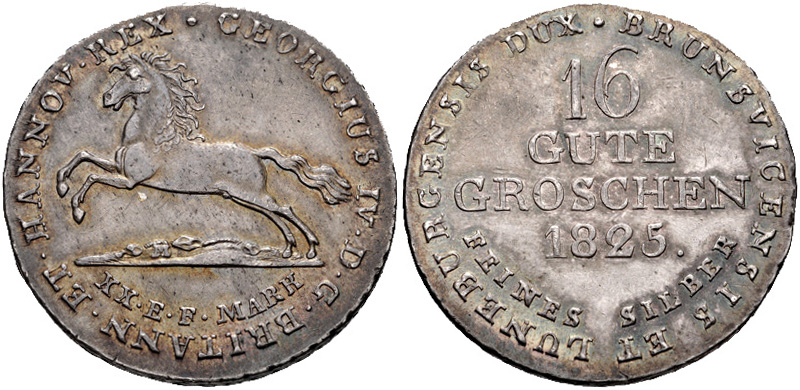
16 Gute Groschen from 1825 King George IV of Great Britain and Hanover

The succession to the throne of the personal union:

- 1 August 1714: George I
- 11 October 1727: George II
- 25 October 1760: George III
- 29 January 1820: George IV
- 26 June 1830–20 June 1837: William IV

== See also ==
- History of Hanover
- Kingdom of Hanover
- Electorate of Hanover
- House of Hanover
- King of Hanover
- Hanoverian prince

== Sources ==
- Drögereit, Richard (1949). Quellen zur Geschichte Kurhannovers im Zeitalter der Personalunion mit England, 1714-1803 (in German). A. Lax.
- Riotte, Torsten; Simms, B. (2007). The Hanoverian Dimension in British History, 1714-1837. United Kingdom: Cambridge University Press. ISBN 9780521842228. LCCN 2007296812.
