= Hill Garden =

The Hill Garden may refer to:

- The Hill Garden and Pergola, Hampstead Heath, London, England
- Berggarten (The Hill Garden), part of the gardens of Herrenhausen Palace, Germany
