= Electorate of Hanover =

State of the Holy Roman Empire (1692–1814)

Electorate of Brunswick-Lüneburg Kurfürstentum Braunschweig-Lüneburg (German)
- 1692–1814
- Flag Coat of arms (1708–1714)
- Motto: Nec Aspera Terrent Difficulties do not daunt
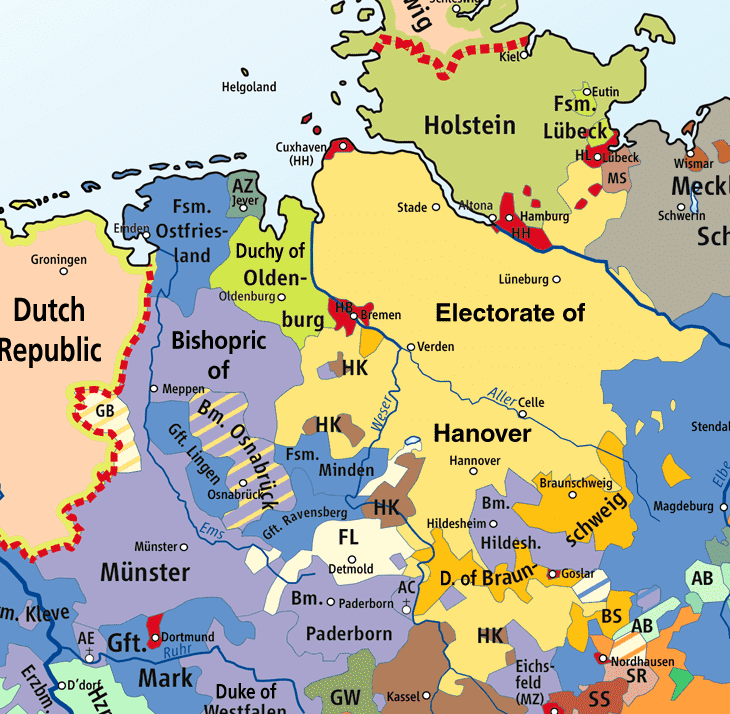
- Extent of the Electorate of Hanover in 1789
- Status: State of the Holy Roman Empire (1692–1806); Personal union with Great Britain and Ireland and the United Kingdom (1714–1807)
- Capital: Hanover; 52°22′N 9°43′E
- Common languages: West Low German
- Religion: Lutheran
- Government: Principality
- Prince-elector
  - 1692–1698: Ernest Augustus
  - 1698–1727: George I Louis
  - 1727–1760: George II Augustus
  - 1760–1806: George III William Frederick
- History
  - Elevation to Electorate: 1692
  - Inherited Lüneburg and Saxe-Lauenburg: 1705
  - Electorate formally approved: 1708
  - Personal union with Great Britain and Ireland: 1714
  - Acquired Bremen-Verden: 1715
  - Merged into Kingdom of Westphalia: 1807
  - Re-established as Kingdom of Hanover: 1814
Preceded by	Succeeded by
Principality of Calenberg; Principality of Lüneburg	1807: Kingdom of Westphalia; 1814: Kingdom of Hanover
- Today part of: Germany

The Electorate of Hanover (German: Kurfürstentum Hannover or simply Kurhannover) was an electorate of the Holy Roman Empire located in northwestern Germany that arose from the Principality of Calenberg. Although formally known as the Electorate of Brunswick-Lüneburg (German: Kurfürstentum Braunschweig-Lüneburg), it made Hanover its capital city. For most of its existence, the electorate was ruled in personal union with Great Britain and Ireland following the Hanoverian Succession.

The Duchy of Brunswick-Lüneburg had been split in 1269 between different branches of the House of Welf. The Principality of Calenberg, ruled by a cadet branch of the family, emerged as the largest and most powerful of the Brunswick-Lüneburg states. In 1692, the Holy Roman Emperor elevated the Prince of Calenberg to the College of Electors, creating the new Electorate of Brunswick-Lüneburg. The fortunes of the electorate were tied to those of Great Britain by the Act of Settlement 1701 and Act of Union 1707, which settled the succession to the British throne on Queen Anne's nearest Protestant relative, the Electress Sophia of Hanover, and her descendants.

The prince-elector of Hanover became King of Great Britain in 1714. As a consequence, a reluctant Britain was forced time and again to defend the king's German possessions. (Note: During the 18th century, whenever war was declared between Great Britain and France, the French army invaded or threatened to invade Hanover, forcing Great Britain to intervene diplomatically and militarily to defend the Electorate. In 1806, George III even declared war on Prussia after King Frederick William III, under heavy pressure from Napoleon, had annexed George III's German possessions.) Nonetheless, Hanover remained a separately ruled territory with its own governmental bodies, and the country had to sign a treaty with Great Britain whenever Hanoverian troops fought on the British side of a war. Merged into the Napoleonic Kingdom of Westphalia in 1807, it was re-established as the Kingdom of Hanover in 1814, and the personal union with the British crown lasted until 1837.

== Name ==
In 1692, Emperor Leopold I of the House of Habsburg elevated Duke Ernest Augustus of the Brunswick-Lüneburg line of Calenberg, due to the efforts of Otto Grote zu Schauen to the rank of prince-elector of the empire as a reward for aid given in the Nine Years' War. There were protests against the addition of a new elector, and the elevation did not become official until the approval of the Imperial Diet in 1708. Calenberg's capital, Hanover, became colloquially eponymous for the electorate, but it officially used the name Chur-Braunschweig-Lüneburg of the entire ducal dynasty.

The electoral coat of arms and flag (see info box upper right of this article) displayed the Saxon Steed (German: Sachsenross, Niedersachsenross, Welfenross, Westfalenpferd; Dutch: Twentse Ros / Saksische ros/paard; Low Saxon: Witte Peerd) is a heraldic motif associated with the German provinces of Lower Saxony and Westphalia, and the Dutch region of Twente as the electorate covered large portions of the original stem Duchy of Saxony.

== Geography ==
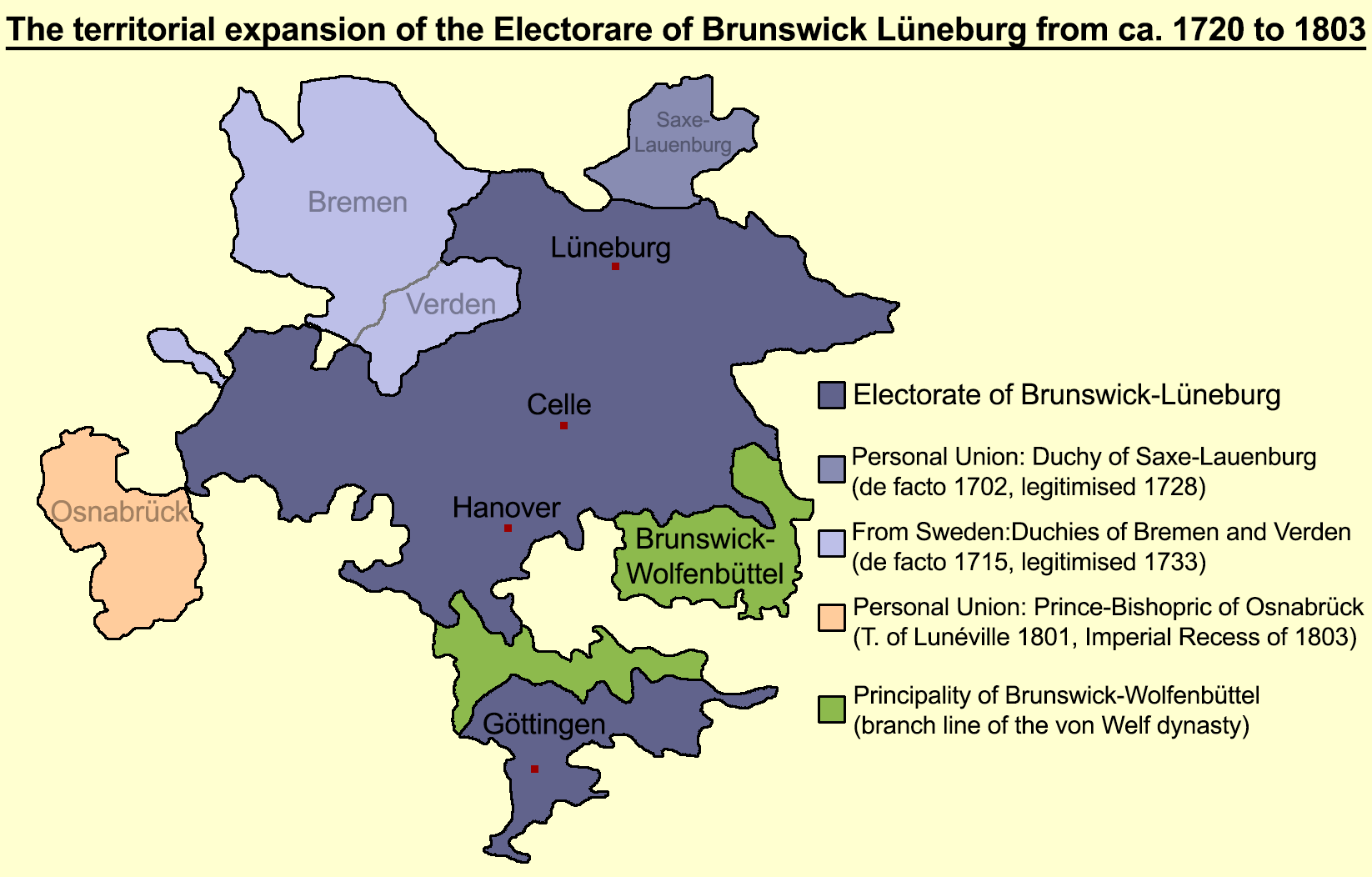
Sketch map of the Duchy of Brunswick-Lüneburg including the Hanover electorate (blue) and the Principality of Brunswick-Wolfenbüttel (green), c. 1720: Elector George I Louis acquired Saxe-Lauenburg and Bremen-Verden, his successor George II Augustus gained Land Hadeln (1731, not shown on the map) and George III acquired the Prince-Bishopric of Osnabrück (1803)

The electorate comprised large parts of the modern German state of Lower Saxony in Northern Germany. Beside the Principality of Calenberg it also included the former princely lands of Göttingen and Grubenhagen as well as the territory of the former County of Hoya and former Lordship of Diepholz.

In 1705, Elector George I Louis inherited the Principality of Lüneburg with the Duchy of Saxe-Lauenburg upon the death of his uncle Duke George William of Brunswick-Lüneburg. In 1715, he purchased the duchies of Bremen-Verden from King Frederick IV of Denmark (confirmed by the 1719 Treaty of Stockholm), whereby his former landlocked electorate gained access to the North Sea.

In 1700, the territories forming the electorate introduced, like all other Protestant territories of imperial immediacy, the Improved Calendar, as the Gregorian calendar was called by Protestants to avoid mentioning the name of Pope Gregory XIII. Sunday, 18 February (Old Style) was thus followed by Monday, 1 March (New Style).

== History ==
In 1692, the Holy Roman Emperor, Leopold I, elevated George's son, Duke Ernest Augustus to the rank of elector of the empire as a reward for aid given in the War of the Grand Alliance. There were protests against the addition of a new elector, and the elevation did not become official (with the approval of the Imperial Diet) until 1708, in the person of Ernest Augustus's son, George Louis. Though the elector's titles were properly duke of Brunswick-Lüneburg and elector of the Holy Roman Empire, he is commonly referred to as the elector of Hanover after his residence.

Hanover acquired Bremen-Verden in 1719.

The electorate was legally bound to be indivisible: it could add to its territory, but not alienate territory or be split up among several heirs; and its succession was to follow male primogeniture. The territory assigned to the electorate included the Brunswick-Lüneburg principalities of Calenberg, Grubenhagen, and Lüneburg (even though at the time Lüneburg was ruled by Ernest Augustus's older brother) and the counties of Diepholz and Hoya.

=== Link with Great Britain ===
Civil ensign of Hanover (1727–1801).

In 1714, George Louis became king of Great Britain and Ireland and so the electorate and Great Britain and Ireland were ruled in personal union. The possessions of the electors in Germany also grew, as they de facto purchased the formerly Swedish-held duchies of Bremen and Verden in 1719.

George Louis died in 1727 and was succeeded by his son George II Augustus. In 1728, Emperor Charles VI officially enfeoffed George II (gave him land in exchange for a pledge of service), with the reverted fief of Saxe-Lauenburg, which had de facto been ruled in personal union with Hanover and with one of its preceding Principality of Lüneburg since 1689.

In 1731, Hanover also gained Hadeln. In return, Hanover recognised the Pragmatic Sanction of 1713, which changed the Habsburgs' inheritance law. It took George II Augustus until 1733 to persuade Charles VI to enfeoff him also with the Duchy of Bremen and the Principality of Verden, colloquially called Duchies of Bremen-Verden. At both enfeoffments, George II Augustus swore that he would respect the existing privileges and constitutions of the estates in Bremen-Verden and in Hadeln, thus confirming 400-year-old traditions of estate participation in government.

In Hanover, the capital of the electorate, the Privy Council of Hanover (electoral government) installed a new ministry in charge of the Imperial Estates ruled by the electors in personal union. It was called the Department of Bremen-Verden, Hadeln, Lauenburg and Bentheim. Nonetheless, the electors spent most of their time in England. Direct contact with the electorate was maintained through the office of the German Chancery, situated in St James's Palace in London.

=== Seven Years' War ===
During the French and Indian War (1754–1763) in the North American colonies, Britain feared a French invasion of Hanover. George II formed an alliance with his Prussian cousin Frederick II combining the North American conflict with the Brandenburg-Prusso–Austrian Third Silesian, or Seven Years' War (1756–1763).

In the summer of 1757, the French invaded Hanover and defeated George II's son Prince William, Duke of Cumberland, leading the Anglo-Hanoverian army, at the Battle of Hastenbeck and drove him and his army into remote Bremen-Verden, where in the former Zeven Convent he capitulated on 18 September (Convention of Kloster-Zeven). George II did not recognise the convention, however. The following year, the British Army, supported by troops from Prussia, Hesse-Kassel and the Principality of Brunswick-Wolfenbüttel, again expelled the occupants. Hanover remained unaffected for the rest of the war.

=== French Revolutionary Wars ===
After the war ended, peace prevailed until the French Revolutionary Wars started. The War of the First Coalition against France (1792–1797) with Great Britain, Hanover and other war allies forming the coalition, did not affect Hanoverian territory since the first French Republic was fighting on several fronts, even on its own territory. Men were drafted to recruit the 16,000 Hanoverian soldiers fighting in the Low Countries under British command against France. In 1795, the Holy Roman Empire declared its neutrality, including Hanover, but a peace treaty with France was being negotiated until it failed in 1799. Prussia, however, ended for its part the war with France by the Treaty of Basel (1795), which stipulated that Prussia would ensure the Holy Roman Empire's neutrality in all of the latter's territories north of the demarcation line of the River Main, including the British continental dominions of Hanover, Bremen-Verden, and Saxe-Lauenburg. To that end, Hanover also had to provide troops for the so-called demarcation army maintaining the armed neutrality.

=== Napoleonic era ===
During the War of the Second Coalition against France (1799–1802), Napoléon Bonaparte urged Prussia to occupy the continental British dominions. In 1801, there was an invasion of 24,000 Prussian soldiers that surprised Hanover, which surrendered without a fight. In April they arrived at Bremen-Verden's capital, Stade, and stayed there until October. The British first ignored Prussian hostility, but when the latter joined the pro-French coalition of armed neutral powers, including Denmark-Norway and Russia, Britain began to capture Prussian ships. After the Battle of Copenhagen (1801), the coalition fell apart and Prussia withdrew its troops.

As part of the German Mediatisation of 25 February 1803, the electorate received the Prince-Bishopric of Osnabrück in real union, which had been ruled by every second ruler of the House of Hanover since 1662.

After Britain, this time without any allies, had declared war on France (18 May 1803), French troops invaded Hanover on 26 May. According to the Convention of Artlenburg (5 July 1803), confirming the military defeat of Hanover, the Hanoverian Army was disarmed, and its horses and ammunitions were handed over to the French. The Privy Council of Hanover, with the minister Friedrich Franz Dieterich von Bremer holding up the Hanoverian stake, fled to Saxe-Lauenburg, across the Elbe, which was ruled by Britain and Hanover in personal union. Soon, the French also occupied Saxe-Lauenburg.

In the autumn of 1805, at the beginning of the War of the Third Coalition against France (1805), the French occupying troops left Hanover in a campaign against Austria. British, Swedish and Russian coalition forces captured Hanover. In December, the French Empire, since 1804 France's new government, ceded Hanover, which it no longer held, to Prussia, which captured it in early 1806.

On 6 August 1806, the Holy Roman Empire was dissolved, thereby abolishing the function of prince-electors electing its emperors. After Prussia had turned against France in the War of the Fourth Coalition, it was defeated in the Battle of Jena-Auerstedt (11 November 1806), and France recaptured Hanover.

Following the Treaty of Tilsit in 1807, the new Kingdom of Westphalia was founded, ruled by Napoléon's brother Jérôme Bonaparte, then including territories of the former Electorate of Hesse-Kassel, the ducal Brunswick-Lüneburgian principality of Brunswick-Wolfenbüttel and formerly Prussian territories. In early 1810 Hanover proper and Bremen-Verden but not Saxe-Lauenburg were also annexed by Westphalia. In an attempt to assert the Continental System, the French Empire annexed in late 1810 all of the continental North Sea coast (as far as Denmark) and the areas along the sections of the rivers navigable for seagoing vessels, including Bremen-Verden and Saxe-Lauenburg and some adjacent territories of Hanover proper.

The government of George III did not recognize the French annexation, however, and was at war continuously with France for the entire period. Hanoverian ministers continued to operate out of London. The Privy Council of Hanover maintained its own separate diplomatic service, which maintained links with countries such as Austria and Prussia. The Hanoverian Army was dissolved, but many of the officers and soldiers went to England, where they formed the King's German Legion. That was the only German army to fight continually throughout the Napoleonic Wars against the French.

French control lasted until November 1813, when the territory was overrun by Allied troops after the Battle of Leipzig spelled the definitive end to the Napoleonic client state of Westphalia, as well as the entire Confederation of the Rhine, and the rule of the House of Hanover was restored. The former electorate became the Kingdom of Hanover, which was confirmed at the Congress of Vienna in 1814.

== Electors of Hanover ==
The electorate was legally indivisible: it could add to its territory, but not alienate territory or be split up among several heirs, as had been the rule before, which led at times to a multitude of Brunswick-Lüneburgian principalities. Its succession was to follow male primogeniture. Since that was against Salic law, which was then valid for the ducal family, the change needed imperial confirmation, which Emperor Leopold I granted in 1692.

In 1692, at its upgrading to the rank of electorate, its territory comprised the Brunswick-Lüneburgian principalities of Calenberg and Grubenhagen, which the line of the former Principality of Calenberg branch of the Welf dynasty had already inherited in 1665. Before the confirmation of the electorate by the Imperial Diet in 1708, however, the Calenberg line further inherited the principality of Celle in 1705. Further included were the earlier-acquired counties of Diepholz and Hoya.

Although the Holy Roman Empire was dissolved in 1806, George III's government did not consider the dissolution to be final, and he continued to be styled "Duke of Brunswick-Luneburg, Arch-treasurer and Prince-Elector of the Holy Roman Empire" until 1814.

List of electors of Hanover
Elector	Dates of reign	Succession	Notes
Ernest Augustus, Elector of Hanover; Ernst August	1692–1698	Son of George, Duke of Brunswick	He married Sophia of the Palatinate, the daughter of Frederick V, Elector Palatine and Elizabeth Stuart, granddaughter of King James I of England. In 1692, he was appointed the first Prince Elector of Hanover by the Holy Roman Emperor.
George I Louis; Georg Ludwig	1698–1727	Son of Ernest Augustus	Became King of Great Britain and Ireland in 1714. Acquired Bremen-Verden in 1719.
George II Augustus; Georg II. August	1727–1760	Son of George I	Acquired the Land of Hadeln in 1731.
George III William Frederick; Georg III. Wilhelm Friedrich	1760–1806	Grandson of George II	Became King of the United Kingdom (by the Act of Union with Ireland) in 1801. Acquired the Prince-Bishopric of Osnabrück in 1803. De facto power was lost and restored by various occupations and annexations during the 1801–1813 Great French War: lost (early 1801), restored (April 1801), lost (May 1803), restored (Autumn 1805), lost (early 1806), and restored (October 1813). Although the electoral title became defunct with the dissolution of the Holy Roman Empire in 1806, George did not recognise that dissolution. Proclaimed King of Hanover in early 1814 and was broadly recognised as such during the 1814–1815 Congress of Vienna.

== See also ==
- Kingdom of Hanover
- House of Hanover
- History of Hanover
- King of Hanover
- Hanoverian prince
