= Ernest Augustus, King of Hanover =

King of Hanover from 1837 to 1851

Ernest Augustus
- Duke of Cumberland and Teviotdale
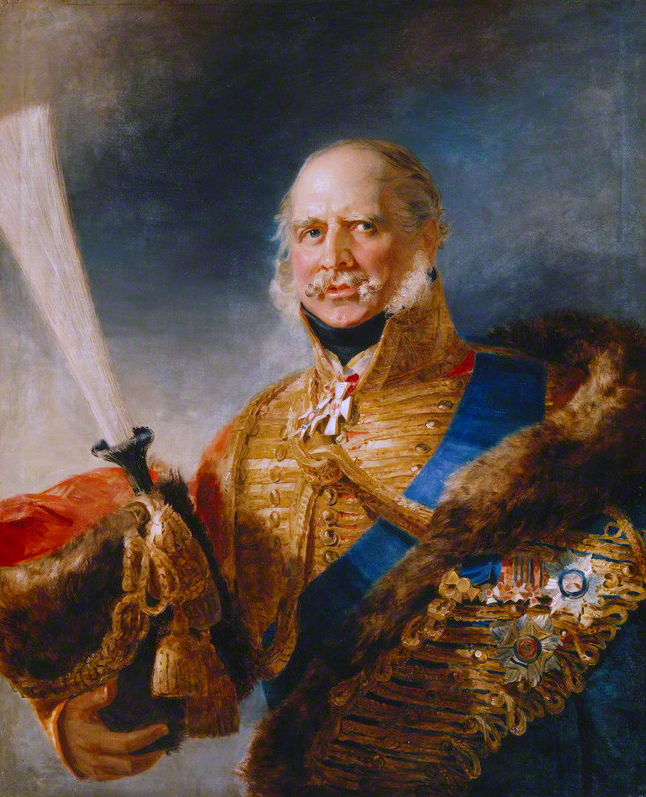
- Portrait of the Duke of Cumberland, c. 1828

King of Hanover
- Reign: 20 June 1837 – 18 November 1851
- Predecessor: William IV
- Successor: George V
- Born: 5 June 1771; Buckingham House, London, England
- Died: 18 November 1851 (aged 80); Hanover
- Burial: 26 November 1851; Herrenhausen Gardens, Hanover
- Spouse: Frederica of Mecklenburg-Strelitz (m. 1815; died 1841)
- Issue: George V of Hanover
- House: Hanover
- Father: George III
- Mother: Charlotte of Mecklenburg-Strelitz
- Religion: Protestant

Member of the House of Lords Lord Temporal
- Hereditary peerage 23 April 1799 – 18 November 1851
- Preceded by: Seat established
- Succeeded by: The 2nd Duke of Cumberland and Teviotdale
- Military career
- Allegiance: Electorate of Hanover; Great Britain; United Kingdom
- Branch: Hanoverian Army; British Army
- Active service: 1791–1813
- Rank: Field Marshal (active service)
- Units: 15th Light Dragoons
- Commands: Severn District; South-West District
- Conflicts: French Revolutionary Wars; Napoleonic Wars; War of the First Coalition; Battle of Tourcoing; War of the Sixth Coalition; Battle of Leipzig

Ernest Augustus (German: Ernst August; 5 June 1771 – 18 November 1851) was King of Hanover from 20 June 1837 until his death in 1851. As the fifth son of George III of the United Kingdom and Hanover, he initially seemed unlikely to become a monarch, but none of his older brothers had a legitimate son. When his brother William IV, who ruled both kingdoms, died in 1837, his niece Victoria inherited the British throne under British succession law, while Ernest succeeded in Hanover under Salic law, which barred women from the succession. This ended the personal union between Britain and Hanover that had begun in 1714. During Victoria's reign, he was heir presumptive to the British throne until the birth of his great-niece Victoria, Princess Royal, in 1840.

Ernest was born in London but was sent to Hanover in his adolescence for his education and military training. While serving with Hanoverian forces near Tournai against Revolutionary France, he received a disfiguring facial wound. He was created Duke of Cumberland and Teviotdale in 1799. Although his mother, Queen Charlotte, disapproved of his marriage in 1815 to her twice-widowed niece, Frederica of Mecklenburg-Strelitz, it proved happy. The eldest son of George III, the Prince of Wales (later George IV), had one child, Charlotte, who was expected to become the British queen, but she died in 1817, giving Ernest some prospect of succeeding to the British and Hanoverian thrones. However, his elder brother Prince Edward, Duke of Kent and Strathearn, fathered the eventual British heir, Victoria, in 1819 shortly before the birth of Ernest's only child, George.

Ernest was an active member of the House of Lords, where he maintained an extremely conservative record. There were persistent allegations (reportedly spread by his political foes) that he had murdered his valet, had fathered a son by his sister Sophia, and intended to take the British throne by murdering Victoria. Following the death of William IV, Ernest became Hanover's first resident ruler since George I. He had a generally successful fourteen-year reign but excited controversy near its start when he voided the liberal constitution granted before his reign and dismissed the Göttingen Seven, including the Brothers Grimm, from their professorial positions for protesting. In 1848, he put down an attempted revolution. Hanover joined the German customs union in 1850 despite Ernest's reluctance. Ernest died the next year and was succeeded by his son, George V.

== Early life (1771–1799) ==
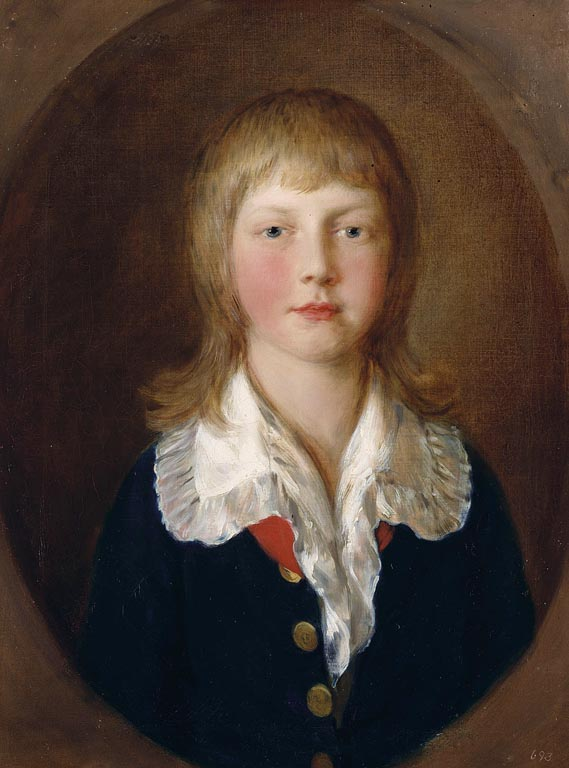
Portrait of a young Ernest by Thomas Gainsborough, 1782

Ernest was born on 5 June 1771 at Buckingham House, London, the fifth son of King George III and Queen Charlotte. He was baptised on 1 July at St James's Palace. His sponsors were Duke Ernest of Mecklenburg (his maternal uncle), Moritz of Saxe-Gotha (his paternal great-uncle, for whom the Earl of Hertford stood proxy), and the Hereditary Princess of Hesse-Kassel (his father's cousin, for whom the Countess of Egremont stood proxy). After leaving the nursery, he lived with his two younger brothers, Prince Adolphus (later Duke of Cambridge) and Prince Augustus (later Duke of Sussex), and a tutor in a house on Kew Green, near his parents' residence at Kew Palace.

Though the King never left England in his life, he sent his younger sons to Germany in their adolescence. According to the historian John Van der Kiste, this was done to limit the influence Ernest's eldest brother George, Prince of Wales, who was leading an extravagant lifestyle, would have over his younger brothers. At the age of fifteen, Ernest and his two younger brothers were sent to the University of Göttingen, located in his father's Electorate of Hanover. Ernest proved a keen student and after being tutored privately for a year, while learning German, he attended lectures at the university. Though King George ordered that the princes' household be run along military lines and that they follow the university's rules, the merchants of the electorate proved willing to extend credit to the princes and all three fell into debt.

In 1790, Ernest asked his father for permission to train with the Prussian Army. Instead, in January 1791, he and Prince Adolphus were sent to Hanover to receive military training under the supervision of Field Marshal Wilhelm von Freytag. Before leaving Göttingen, Ernest penned a formal letter of thanks to the university and wrote to his father, "I should be one of the most ungrateful of men if ever I was forgetful of all I owe to Göttingen & its professors." Commissioned into the Hanoverian Army at the rank of lieutenant, Ernest learned cavalry drill and tactics under Captain Karl von Linsingen of the 9th (Queen's) Light Dragoons and proved to be an excellent horseman, as well as a good shot. After only two months of training, Freytag was so impressed by Ernest's progress that he appointed him as a captain in the regiment. Ernest was supposed to receive infantry training, but the King, also impressed by his son's prowess, allowed him to remain as a cavalryman.

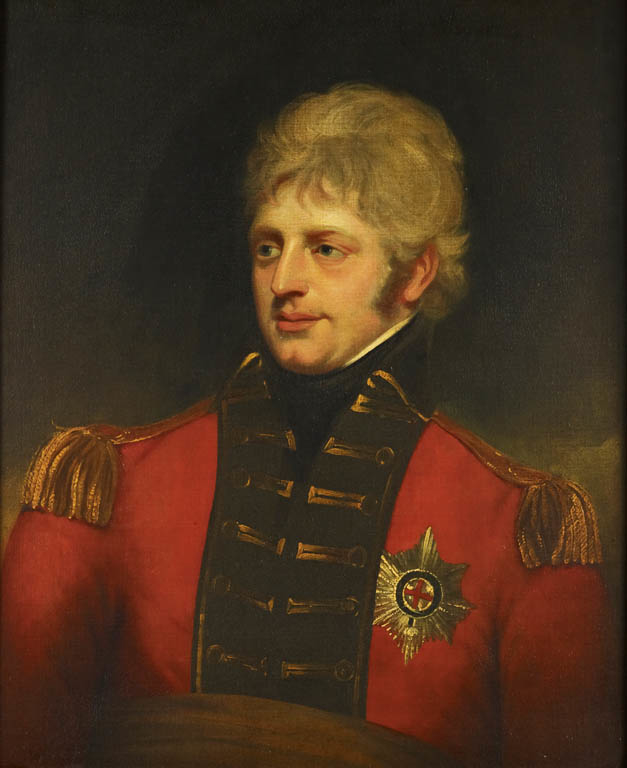
c. 1795 portrait of Ernest

In March 1792, the King commissioned Ernest as a colonel in the 9th (Queen's) Light Dragoons. Ernest served in the Low Countries during the War of the First Coalition under his elder brother Prince Frederick, Duke of York and Albany, the supreme commander of a Coalition army of British, Hanoverian and Austrian troops. In a skirmish with the French army near the Wallonian town of Tournai in August 1793, he sustained a sabre wound to the head, which resulted in a disfiguring scar. At the Battle of Tourcoing on 18 May 1794, his left arm was injured by a French cannonball passing close by him. In the days after the battle, the sight in his left eye faded. In June, he was sent to England to convalesce, his first stay there since 1786.

Ernest resumed his duties in early November, by now promoted to major general. He hoped his new rank would bring him a corps or brigade command, but none was forthcoming as Coalition troops retreated slowly through the Dutch Republic towards Germany. By February 1795, they had reached Hanover. Ernest remained in Hanover over the next year, holding several unimportant postings. He had requested a return home to seek treatment for his eye, but it was not until early 1796 that the King agreed and allowed Ernest to return to England. There, Ernest consulted eye surgeon Wathen Waller, but Waller apparently found his condition inoperable, as no operation took place. In England, Ernest repeatedly sought to be allowed to join Coalition forces on the Continent, even threatening to join the Yeomanry Cavalry as a private, but both the King and the Duke of York refused him permission. Ernest did not want to rejoin the Hanoverian Army, as they were not then involved in the fighting. In addition, Freytag was seriously ill and Ernest was unwilling to serve under his likely successor, Johann Ludwig, Reichsgraf von Wallmoden-Gimborn.

== Duke of Cumberland ==
=== Military commander ===
On 23 April 1799, George III created Prince Ernest Augustus Duke of Cumberland and Teviotdale and Earl of Armagh, and Ernest was granted an allowance of £12,000 a year, equivalent to £1.19 million in 2025. Though he was made a lieutenant general in both the British and Hanoverian armies, he remained in England and with a seat in the House of Lords entered into a political career. A High Tory, he soon became a leader of the Tories' right wing. King George had feared that Ernest, like some of his elder brothers, would display Whig tendencies. Reassured on that point, in 1801, the King had Ernest conduct the negotiations which led to the formation of the Addington government. In February 1802, King George granted his son the colonelcy of the 27th Light Dragoons, a post which offered the option of transfer to the colonelcy of the 15th Light Dragoons when a vacancy arose. A vacancy promptly occurred and the Duke became the colonel of the 15th Light Dragoons in March 1802. Although the post could have been a sinecure, Ernest involved himself in the affairs of the regiment and led it on manoeuvres.

In early 1803, the Duke of York appointed Ernest as commander of the Severn District, in charge of the forces in and around the Severn Estuary. When Britain declared war on France a year after the Treaty of Amiens was signed, Frederick appointed Ernest to the more important South-West District, comprising Hampshire, Dorset and Wiltshire. Though Ernest would have preferred command of the King's German Legion, composed mostly of expatriates from French-occupied Hanover, he accepted the post. The Duke of Cumberland increased the defences on the South Coast, especially around the town of Weymouth, where his father often spent time in the summer.

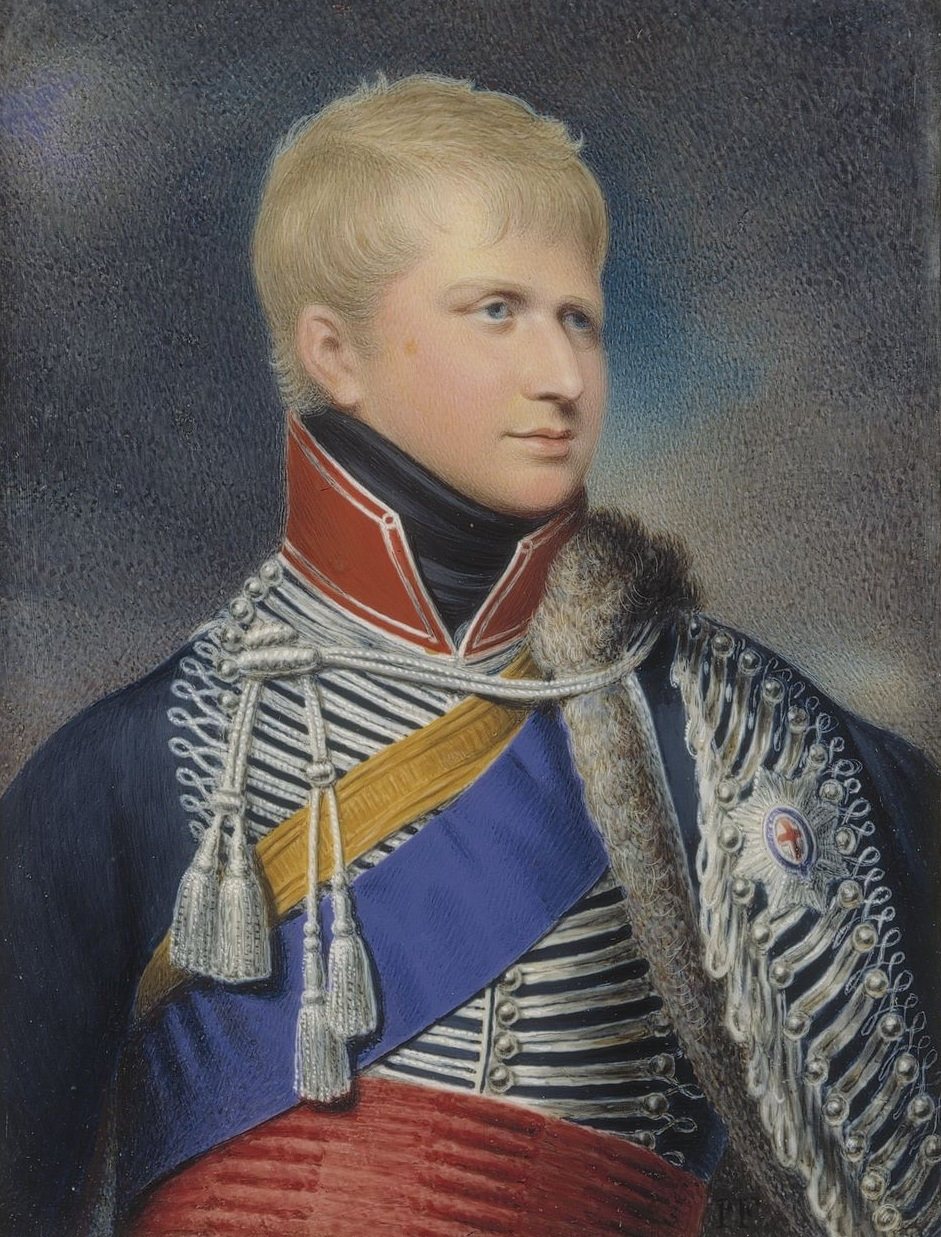
1823 miniature of Ernest based on an 1802 William Beechey portrait

The Acts of Union 1800 had given Ireland representation in Parliament, but existing law prevented Irish Catholics from serving there because of their religion. Catholic emancipation was a major political issue of the first years of the 19th century. The Duke of Cumberland was a strong opponent of giving political rights to Catholics, believing that emancipation would be a violation of the King's Coronation Oath to uphold Anglicanism and spoke out in the House of Lords against emancipation. Protestant Irish organisations supported the Duke; he was elected Chancellor of the University of Dublin in 1805 and Grand Master of the Orange Lodges two years later.

The Duke repeatedly sought a post with Coalition forces fighting against France, but was sent to the Continent only as an observer. In 1807, he advocated sending British troops to prevent the French and their allies from capturing the Swedish-held city of Stralsund. The Grenville ministry refused to send any troops; shortly afterwards, the ministry fell and the new prime minister William Cavendish-Bentinck, 3rd Duke of Portland agreed to send Ernest with 20,000 troops. However, they were sent too late, as a French-led army captured Stralsund from the Swedish before Ernest and his troops could reach the city. Ernest was promoted to general in the British Army in 1808, backdated to 1805.

=== Sellis incident and Weymouth controversy ===
In the early hours of 31 May 1810, Ernest, by his written account, was struck in the head several times while asleep in bed, awakening him. He ran for the door, where he was wounded in the leg by a sabre. He called for help and one of his valets, Cornelius Neale, responded and aided him. Neale raised the alarm and the household soon realised that Ernest's other valet, Joseph Sellis, was not among them and that the door to Sellis's room was locked. The lock was forced and Sellis was discovered with his throat freshly cut, a wound apparently self-inflicted. Ernest received several serious wounds during the apparent attack and required over a month to recover from his injuries. The social reformer and anti-monarchist Francis Place managed to join the inquest jury and became its foreman. Place went to the office of a barrister friend to study inquest law and aggressively questioned witnesses. Place also insisted that the inquest be opened to the public and press, and so cowed the coroner that he basically ran the inquest himself. Nevertheless, the jury returned a unanimous verdict of suicide against Sellis.

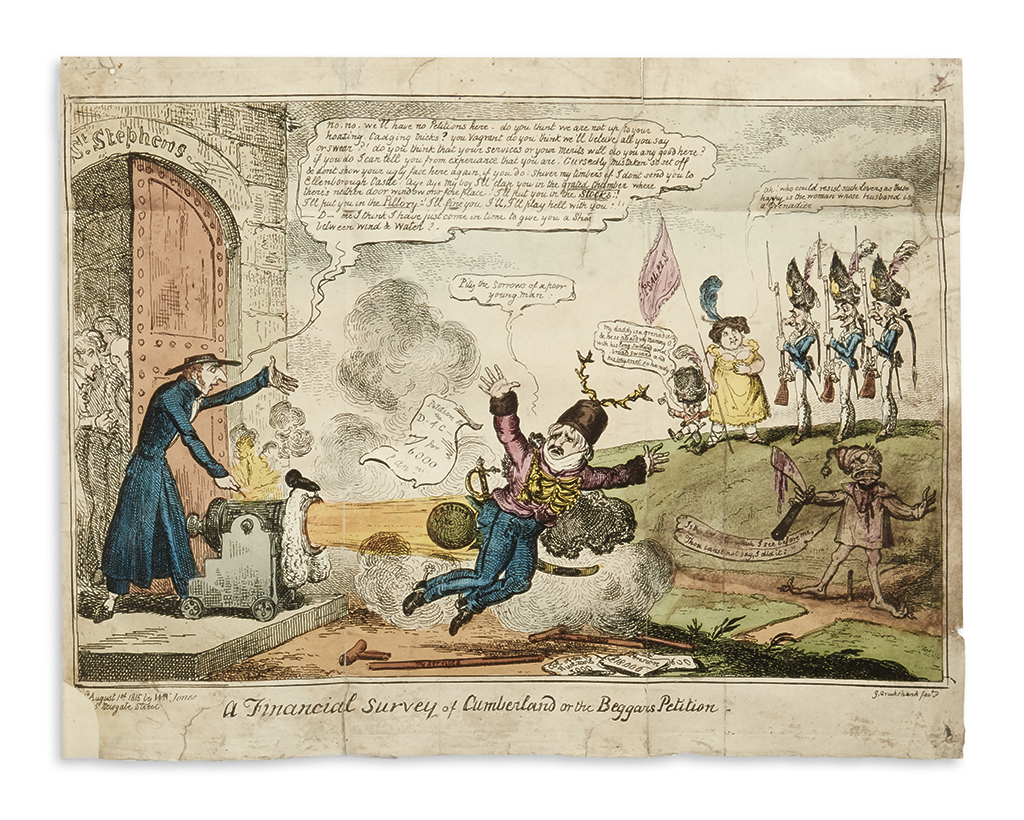
A George Cruikshank cartoon mocking Ernest at the 1815 defeat of his increased allowance. The brown section at lower right covers an image of the ghost of Sellis (visible if enlarged), who hints at the Duke's involvement in his death (Cruikshank self-censored most copies for fear of a libel suit).

Much of the public blamed Ernest for Sellis's death. The more extreme Whig papers, anti-royal pamphleteers, and caricaturists all offered nefarious explanations for Sellis's death, in which the Duke was to blame. Some stories had the Duke cuckolding Sellis, with the attack as retaliation, or Sellis killed for finding Ernest and Mrs. Sellis in bed together. Others suggested that the Duke was the lover of either Sellis or Neale, and that blackmail had played a part in the death. Both Roger Fulford and John Van der Kiste, who wrote books about George III's children, ascribe part of the animus and fear towards the Duke to the fact that he did not conduct love affairs in public, as did his elder brothers. According to them, the public feared what vices might be going on behind the locked doors of the Duke's house and assumed the worst.

In early 1813, Ernest was involved in political scandal during an election contest in Weymouth following the general election the previous year. The Duke was shown to be one of three trustees who were able to dictate who would represent Weymouth in Parliament. It being considered improper for a peer to interfere in an election to the House of Commons, there was considerable controversy and the government sent Ernest to Europe as an observer to accompany Hanoverian troops, which were again engaged in war against France. Though he saw no action, Ernest was present at the Battle of Leipzig, a major victory for the Allies. Following this, Ernest received ultimate promotion, to Field Marshal, on 26 November 1813.

=== Marriage ===
Ernest met and fell in love in mid-1813 with his first cousin, Duchess Frederica of Mecklenburg-Strelitz, wife of Prince Frederick William of Solms-Braunfels and widow of Prince Louis Charles of Prussia. The two agreed to wed if Frederica became free to marry. Her marriage to Frederick William had not been a success; her husband, seeing the marriage was beyond hope, agreed to a divorce, but his sudden death in 1814 removed the necessity. Some considered the death too convenient and suspected Frederica of poisoning her husband. Queen Charlotte opposed the marriage: before Frederica had married Frederick William, she had jilted Ernest's younger brother, Prince Adolphus, Duke of Cambridge, after the engagement was announced.

Following the marriage in Germany on 29 May 1815, Queen Charlotte refused to receive her new daughter-in-law, nor would the Queen attend the resolemnisation of the Cumberlands' marriage at Kew, which Ernest's four elder brothers attended. The Prince of Wales (who had been Prince Regent since 1811) found the Cumberlands' presence in Britain embarrassing, and offered him money and the governorship of Hanover if they would leave for the Continent. Ernest refused and the Cumberlands divided their time between Kew and St. James's Palace for the next three years. The Queen remained obstinate in her refusal to receive Frederica. Despite these family troubles, the Cumberlands had a happy marriage. Lord Liverpool's government asked Parliament to increase the Duke's allowance by £6,000 per year in 1815 (equal to about £462,000 today), so he could meet increased expenses due to his marriage. The Duke's involvement in the Weymouth election became an issue and the bill failed by one vote. Liverpool tried again in 1817; this time the bill failed by seven votes.

At the time of the Duke's marriage in 1815, it seemed to have little dynastic significance to Britain. Princess Charlotte of Wales, only child of the Prince Regent, was the King's only legitimate grandchild. The young princess was expected to have children who would secure the British succession, especially after she married Prince Leopold of Saxe-Coburg-Saalfeld in 1816. Both the Prince Regent and the Duke of York were married but estranged from their wives, while the next two brothers, William, Duke of Clarence, and Edward, Duke of Kent, were unmarried. On 6 November 1817, Princess Charlotte died after delivering a stillborn son. King George was left with twelve surviving children and no surviving legitimate grandchildren. Most of the unmarried royal dukes hurriedly sought out suitable brides and hastened to the altar, hoping to secure the succession for another generation.

Seeing little prospect of the Queen giving in and receiving her daughter-in-law, the Cumberlands moved to Germany in 1818. They had difficulty living within their means in Britain and the cost of living was much lower in Germany. Queen Charlotte died on 17 November 1818, but the Cumberlands remained in Germany, living principally in Berlin, where the Duchess had relatives. In 1817, the Duchess had a stillborn daughter; in 1819 she gave birth to Prince George of Cumberland. The Duke occasionally visited England, where he stayed with his eldest brother, who in 1820 succeeded to the British and Hanoverian thrones as George IV. George III's fourth son, the Duke of Kent, died six days before his father, but left a daughter, Princess Alexandrina Victoria of Kent. With the death of George III, Ernest became fourth in line to the British throne, following the Duke of York (who died without legitimate issue in 1827), the Duke of Clarence and Princess Victoria. Returning to England, his political power was again considerable, as it seemed possible that he would succeed to the throne.

=== Politics and unpopularity ===
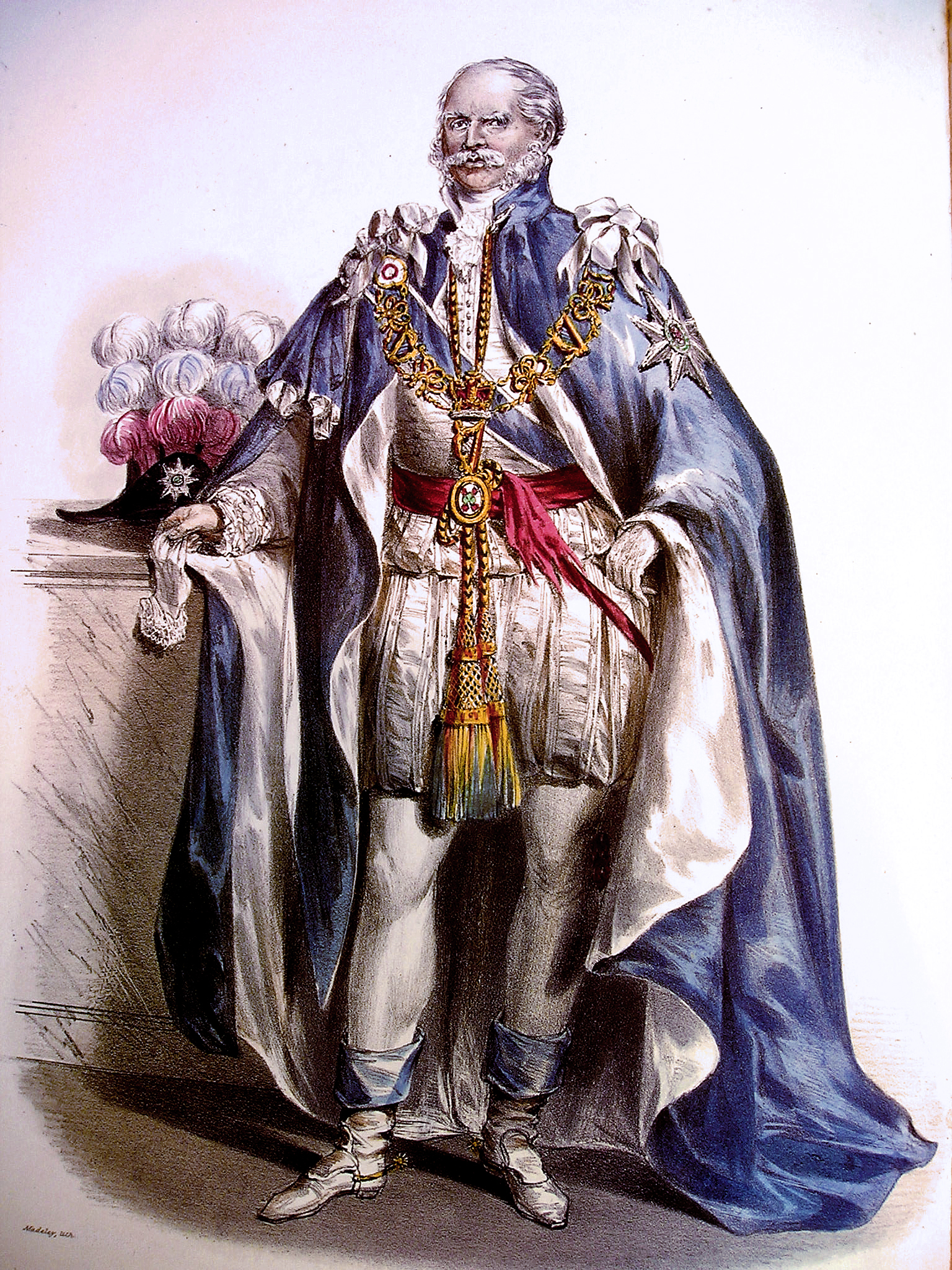
Ernest Augustus wearing the robes of a Knight of the Order of St Patrick

In 1826, Parliament finally voted to increase Ernest's allowance. The Liverpool government argued that the Duke needed an increased allowance to pay for Prince George's education; even so, it was opposed by many Whigs. The bill, which passed the House of Commons 120–97, required George to live in England if Ernest was to receive the money.

In 1828, Ernest was staying with the King at Windsor Castle when severe disturbances broke out in Ireland among Catholics. The Duke was an ardent supporter of the Protestant cause in Ireland and returned to Berlin in August, believing that the government, led by the Duke of Wellington, would deal firmly with the Irish. In January 1829, the Wellington government announced that it would introduce a Catholic emancipation bill to conciliate the Irish. Disregarding a request from Wellington that he remain abroad, Ernest returned to London and was one of the leading opponents to the Roman Catholic Relief Act 1829, influencing George IV against the bill. Within days of his arrival, the King instructed the officers of his Household to vote against the bill. Hearing of this, Wellington told the King that he must resign as Prime Minister unless the King could assure him of complete support. The King initially accepted Wellington's resignation and Ernest attempted to put together a government united against Catholic emancipation. Though such a government would have had considerable support in the House of Lords, it would have had little support in the Commons and Ernest abandoned his attempt. The King recalled Wellington. The bill passed the Lords and became law.

The Wellington government hoped that Ernest would return to Germany, but he moved his wife and son to Britain in 1829. The Times reported that they would live at Windsor in the "Devil's Tower"; instead, the Duke reopened his house at Kew. They settled there as rumours flew that he was the father of Thomas Garth (the younger) by his sister Princess Sophia. It was also said that Ernest had blackmailed the King by threatening to expose this secret, though John Van der Kiste points out that Ernest would have been ill-advised to blackmail with a secret which, if exposed, would ruin his reputation. These rumours were spread as Ernest journeyed to London to fight against Catholic emancipation. Whig politician and diarist Thomas Creevey wrote about the Garth rumour in mid-February and there is some indication the rumours began with Princess Lieven, wife of the Russian ambassador.

Newspapers also reported, in July 1829, that the Duke had been thrown out of Lord Lyndhurst's house for assaulting Lyndhurst's wife Sarah. In early 1830, a number of newspapers printed articles hinting that Ernest was having an affair with Lady Graves, a mother of fifteen, now past fifty. (Note: Fulford 1933, p. 235. "For some months, the newspapers had been hinting at an amour between the Duke and a certain Lady Graves.") In February 1830, Lord Graves, the Duke's lord of the bedchamber and comptroller of his household, wrote a note to his wife expressing his confidence in her innocence, then cut his own throat. Two days after Lord Graves's death (and the day after the inquest), The Times printed an article connecting Lord Graves's death with Sellis's. After being shown the suicide note, The Times withdrew its implication there might be a connection between the two deaths. Nonetheless, many believed the Duke responsible for the suicide—or guilty of a second murder. (Note: Fulford 1933, pp. 235–236. "... and inevitably had the effect of making the public believe that the Duke had murdered Lord Graves as well as Sellis.") The Duke later stated that he had been "accused of every crime in the decalogue". Ernest's biographer Anthony Bird states that while there is no proof, he has no doubt that the rumours against the Duke were spread by the Whigs for political ends. Another biographer, Geoffrey Willis, pointed out that no scandal had attached itself to the Duke during the period of over a decade when he resided in Germany; it was only when he announced his intention to return to Britain that "a campaign of unparalleled viciousness" began against him. The Duke of Wellington once told Charles Greville that George IV had said of Ernest's unpopularity, "there was never a father well with his son, or husband with his wife, or lover with his mistress, or a friend with his friend, that he did not try to make mischief between them." According to Bird, Ernest was the most unpopular man in England.

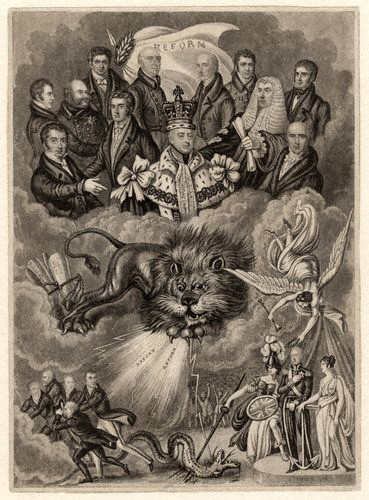
Political cartoon supporting the Reform Act: William IV sits above the clouds, surrounded by Whig politicians; below, Britannia and the British Lion cause the Tories (Ernest second from left) to flee.

The Duke's influence at court was ended by the death of George IV in June 1830 and the succession of the Duke of Clarence as William IV. Wellington wrote that "the effect of the King's death will ... be to put an end to the Duke of Cumberland's political character and power in this country entirely". King William had no legitimate children (two daughters having died in infancy) and Ernest was now heir presumptive in Hanover, since the British heir presumptive, Princess Victoria, as a female could not inherit there. William realised that, so long as the Duke maintained a power base at Windsor, he could wield unwanted influence. The Duke was Gold Stick as head of the Household Cavalry; William made the Duke's post responsible to the Commander in Chief rather than to the King, and an insulted Ernest, outraged at the thought of having to report to an officer junior to himself, resigned.

King William again emerged triumphant when the new queen, Adelaide of Saxe-Meiningen, wished to quarter her horses in the stables customarily used by the consort, but which were then occupied by Ernest's horses. Ernest initially refused the King's order to remove the horses, but gave in when told that William's grooms would remove them if Ernest did not move them voluntarily. However, Ernest and William remained friendly throughout the latter's seven-year reign. Ernest's house at Kew was too small for his family; the King gave the Duke and Duchess lifetime residence in a nearby, larger house by the entrance to Kew Gardens. Ernest, who was against the extension of civil and religious liberties, opposed the Reform Act 1832 and was one of the "diehard" peers who voted against the bill on its final reading in which most Tories abstained under threat of seeing the House of Lords flooded with Whig peers. His unpopularity was deepened by the suggestion that he favoured the creation of Orange lodges in the army.

Ernest was the subject of more allegations in 1832, when two young women accused him of trying to ride them down as they walked near Hammersmith. The Duke had not left his grounds at Kew on the day in question and was able to ascertain that the rider was one of his equerries, who professed not to have seen the women. Nevertheless, newspapers continued to print references to the incident, suggesting that Ernest had done what the women stated and was cravenly trying to push blame on another. The same year, the Duke sued for libel after a book appeared accusing him of having his valet Neale kill Sellis and the jury found against the author. (Note: Bird 1966, pp. 221–224. "but sneering references to the Duke's supposed misdemeanour and his cowardice in trying to blame it on an equerry continued to appear".) The Cumberlands suffered further tragedy, as young Prince George went blind. The prince had been blind in one eye for several years; an accident at age thirteen took the sight of the other. Ernest had hoped that his son might marry Princess Victoria and keep the British and Hanoverian thrones united, but the handicap made it unlikely that George could win Victoria's hand and raised questions about whether he should succeed in Hanover.

The Duke spent William IV's reign in the House of Lords, where he was assiduous in his attendance. Newspaper editor James Grant wrote that "He is literally—the door-keeper of course excepted—the first man in the House and the last out of it. And this not merely generally, but every night." Grant, in his observations of the leading members of the House of Lords, indicated that the Duke was not noted for his oratory (he delivered no speech longer than five minutes) and had a voice that was difficult to understand, though "his manner is most mild and conciliatory". Grant denigrated the Duke's intellect and influence, but stated that the Duke had indirect influence over several members, and that "he is by no means so bad a tactician as his opponents suppose".

Controversy arose in 1836 over the Orange Lodges. The lodges (which took anti-Catholic views) were said to be ready to rise and try to put the Duke of Cumberland on the throne on the death of King William. According to Joseph Hume, speaking in the House of Commons, Victoria was to be passed over on the grounds of her age, sex, and incapacity. The Commons passed a resolution calling for the dissolution of the lodges. When the matter reached the Lords, the Duke defended himself, saying of Princess Victoria, "I would shed the last drop of my blood for my niece." The Duke indicated that the Orange Lodge members were loyal and were willing to dissolve the lodges in Great Britain. According to Bird, this incident was the source of the widespread rumours that Ernest intended to murder Victoria and take the British throne for himself.

== King of Hanover (1837–1851) ==
=== Accession ===
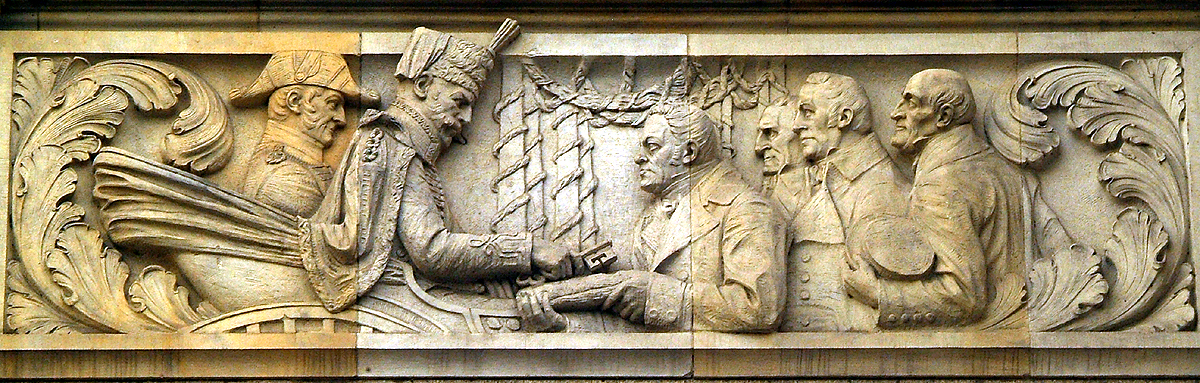
At his entry to Hanover, Ernest Augustus (centre left) is symbolically presented with the keys to the city by city director Wilhelm Rumann (centre right). Relief by August Waterbeck as part of the history frieze on the New Town Hall of Hanover.

On 20 June 1837, William IV died. Victoria succeeded him as Queen of the United Kingdom, while Ernest Augustus became King of Hanover. On 28 June 1837, Ernest entered his new domain, passing under a triumphal arch. For the first time in over a century, Hanover would have a ruler living there. Many Hanoverians were of a liberal perspective and would have preferred the popular viceroy, Prince Adolphus, Duke of Cambridge, to become king, but the Dukes of Sussex and Cambridge refused to lend themselves to any movement by which they would become king rather than their elder brother. According to Roger Fulford in his study of George III's younger sons, Royal Dukes, "In 1837, King Ernest was the only male descendant of George III who was willing and able to continue the connection with Hanover." (Note: Fulford 1933, p. 244. "the rather opinionated Liberalism of the Hanoverians" "The Duke of Cambridge loyally refused to listen to the whispers that he should supersede King Ernest".)

=== Domestic affairs ===
==== Constitutional controversy ====
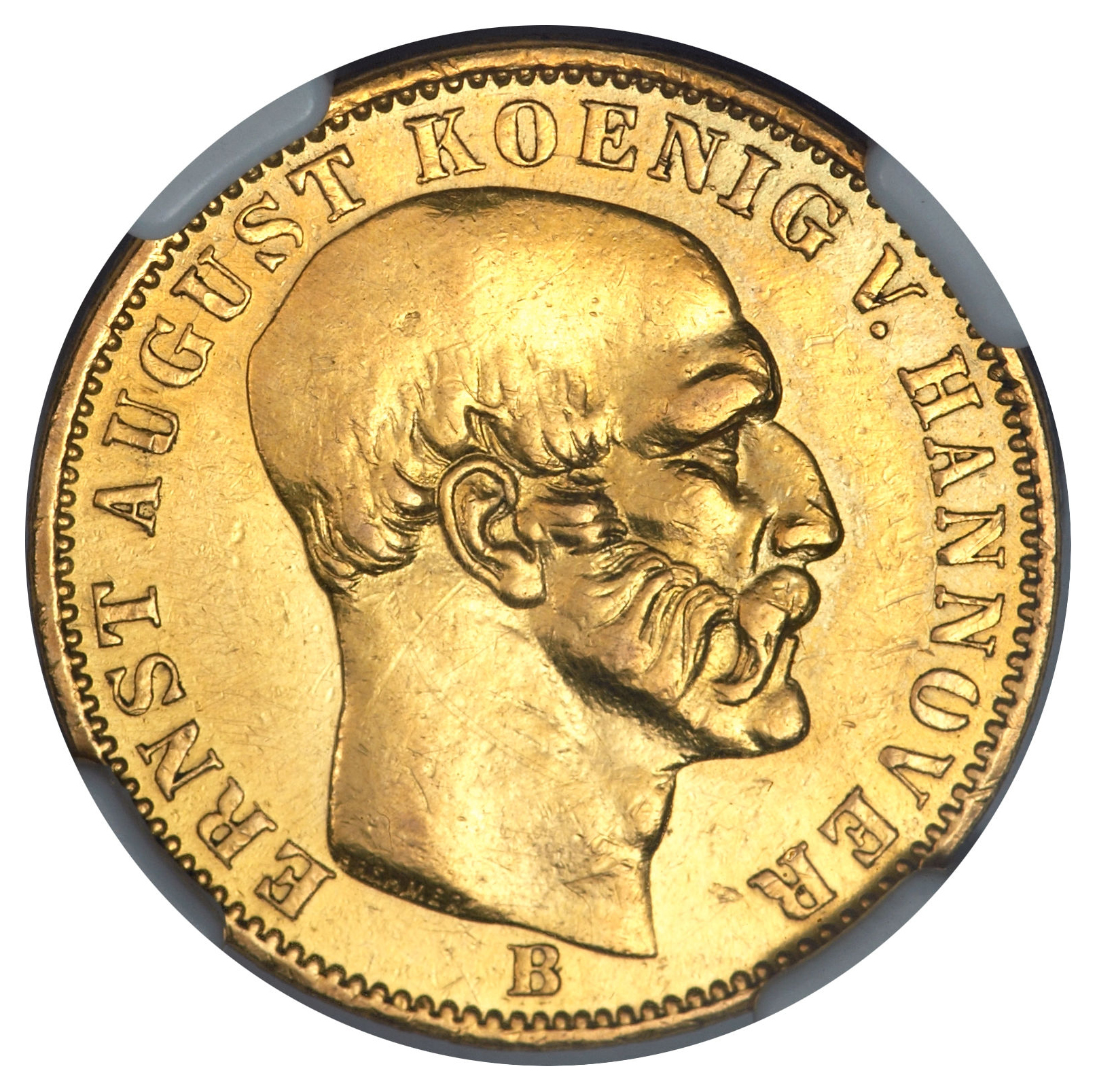
1849 five-thaler coin depicting King Ernest Augustus

Hanover had received its first constitution, granted by the Prince Regent, in 1819; this did little more than denote Hanover's change from an electorate to a kingdom, guaranteed by the Congress of Vienna. The Duke of Cambridge, as King William's viceroy in Hanover, recommended a thorough reorganisation of the Hanoverian government. William IV had given his consent to a new constitution in 1833. The Duke of Cumberland's consent was neither asked nor received, and he had formally protested against the constitution's adoption without his consent. One provision of the constitution transferred the Hanoverian Domains (the equivalent of the British Crown Estate) from the sovereign to the state, eroding the monarch's power.

Immediately upon his arrival in Hanover, the King dissolved the Hanoverian Parliament, which had been convened under the disputed constitution. On 5 July, he proclaimed the suspension of the constitution, on the grounds that his consent had not been asked and that it did not meet the kingdom's needs. On 1 November 1837, the King issued a patent, declaring the constitution void, but upholding all laws passed under it. The 1819 constitution was restored. His son, Crown Prince George, endorsed the action.

In carrying the King's patent into effect, the Cabinet required all officeholders, including professors at Göttingen University, to renew their oaths of allegiance to the King. Seven professors including the two Brothers Grimm refused to take the oaths and agitated for others to protest against the King's decree. Since they did not take the oaths, the seven lost their positions and the King expelled the three most responsible, including Jacob Grimm, from Hanover. Only one of the seven, orientalist Heinrich Ewald, was a citizen of Hanover, and he was not expelled. In the final years of the King's reign, the three were invited to return. Ernest wrote of the incident to his brother-in-law, Frederick William III of Prussia, "If each of these seven gentlemen had addressed a letter to me expressing his opinion, I would have had no cause to take exception to their conduct. But to call a meeting and publish their opinions even before the government had received their protest—that is what they have done and that I cannot allow." Ernest received a deputation of Göttingen citizens who, fearing student unrest, applauded the dismissals. However, he was widely criticised in Europe, especially in Britain. In the British House of Commons, MP Colonel Thomas Perronet Thompson proposed to Parliament that if the as-yet-childless Queen Victoria died, making Ernest the British king, Parliament should declare that King Ernest had forfeited all rights to the British throne by his actions.

A more significant protest against the revocation of the 1833 constitution was the refusal of a number of towns to appoint parliamentary deputies. However, by 1840 a sufficient number of deputies had been appointed for the King to summon Parliament, which met for two weeks in August, approving a modified version of the 1819 constitution, passing a budget and sending a vote of thanks to the King. The Parliament met again the following year, passed a three-year budget and adjourned again.

==== National development and trade, the 1848 crisis ====
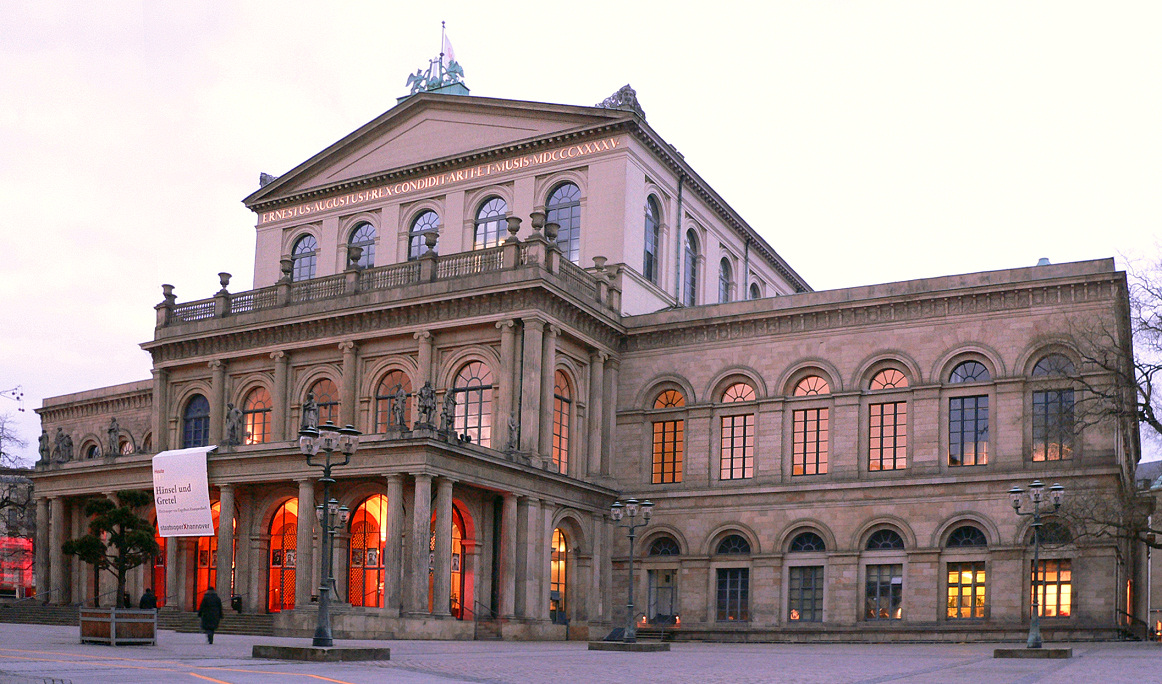
The Hanover Opernhaus

At the time the King took the throne, the city of Hanover was a densely packed residential town and did not rise to the grand style of many German capitals. Once the political crises of the first years of his reign had subsided, he set out to remedy this state of affairs. Ernest's support led to gas lighting in the city streets of Hanover, up-to-date sanitation and the development of a new residential quarter. He had the plans altered in 1841, after Queen Frederica's death, to leave standing the Altes Palais, where the two had lived since arriving in Hanover. Ernest's interest in and support of the railroads led to Hanover becoming a major railway junction, much to the nation's benefit. However, when court architect Georg Ludwig Friedrich Laves in 1837 proposed the building of an opera house in Hanover, the King initially refused, calling the proposal "this utterly absurd idea of building a court theatre in the middle of this green field". The King finally gave his consent in 1844 and the opera house opened in 1852, a year after the King's death.

Every week, the King travelled with his secretary to different parts of his kingdom, and anyone could lay a petition before him—although Ernest had petitions screened by the secretary so he would not have to deal with frivolous complaints. Ernest opened high ministerial positions to those of any class, securing the services of several ministers who would not have been eligible without this reform. Though the King had, while Duke of Cumberland, fought against Catholic emancipation in Britain and Ireland, he made no objection to Catholics in government service in Hanover and even visited their churches. Ernest explained this by stating that there were no historical reasons to restrict Catholics in Hanover, as there had been in the United Kingdom. He continued to oppose admission of Jews into the British Parliament, but gave Jews in Hanover equal rights.

The King supported a postal union and common currency among the German states, but opposed the Prussian-led customs union, the Zollverein, fearing that it would lead to Prussian dominance and the end of Hanover as an independent state. Instead, the King supported the Steuerverein, which Hanover and other western German states had formed in 1834. When the Steuerverein treaties came up for renewal in 1841, Brunswick pulled out of the union and joined the Zollverein, greatly weakening Hanover's position, especially since Brunswick had enclaves within Hanover. Ernest was able to postpone the enclaves' entry into the Zollverein and, when a trade war began, was able to outlast Brunswick. In 1845, Brunswick, Hanover and Prussia signed a trade agreement. In 1850, Ernest reluctantly permitted Hanover to join the Zollverein, though the entry was on favourable terms. Ernest's forebodings about Prussia were warranted. In 1866, fifteen years after his death, Hanover chose the side of the Austrian Empire in the Austro-Prussian War and was defeated and annexed by Prussia.

Hanover was little affected by the revolutions of 1848. A few small disturbances were put down by the cavalry without bloodshed. When agitators arrived from Berlin at the end of May 1848 and there were demonstrations outside the King's palace, Ernest sent out the Prime Minister. The Prime Minister warned that, if the demonstrators made any inappropriate demands on the King, Ernest would pack up his things and leave for Britain, taking the Crown Prince with him. This would leave the country at the mercy of expansionist Prussia and the threat put an end to the agitation. Afterwards, the King granted a new constitution, somewhat more liberal than the 1819 document.

=== Relations with Britain ===
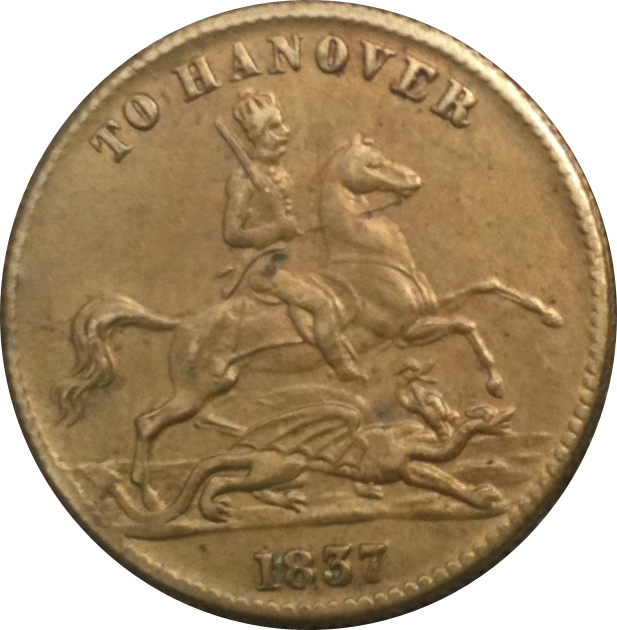
British "To Hanover" token or "Cumberland Jack", marking Ernest's departure from Britain. These pieces were struck through much of the 19th century as whist counters and were sometimes passed as real gold coins to the unwary.

Ernest Augustus is supposed to have asked the advice of the Duke of Wellington as to what course he should take after Queen Victoria's accession, with Wellington supposedly saying "Go before you are pelted out." However, Bird dismisses this story as unlikely, given Wellington's customary respect to royalty and the fact that Ernest had little choice in what to do—he had to go to his kingdom as quickly as possible. One decision the new king did have to make was whether, in his capacity as Duke of Cumberland, to swear allegiance to Victoria in the House of Lords. Shortly after William's death, Ernest heard from Lord Lyndhurst that Lord Cottenham, the Lord Chancellor, had stated that he would refuse to administer the Oath of Allegiance to the King, as a foreign sovereign. The King hurriedly appeared in the House of Lords, before his departure for Hanover, and subscribed to the Oath before the Chief Clerk as a matter of routine. Ernest was heir presumptive to Queen Victoria until the birth of her daughter Victoria, Princess Royal, in November 1840. The Lord Privy Seal, George Villiers, 4th Earl of Clarendon, wrote, "What the country cares about is to have a life more, whether male or female, between the succession and the King of Hanover."

Almost immediately upon going to Hanover, the King became involved in a dispute with his niece. Queen Victoria had a strained relationship with her mother Victoria, Duchess of Kent, and wanted to give the Duchess accommodation near her, for the sake of appearances, but not too near her. To that end, she asked the King to give up his apartments at St James's Palace in favour of the Duchess. The King, wishing to retain apartments in London in anticipation of frequent visits to England and reluctant to give way in favour of a woman who had frequently fought with his brother, King William, declined and the Queen angrily rented a house for her mother. At a time when the Queen was trying to pay off her father's debts, she saw this as an unnecessary expense. Her ill-feeling towards the King increased when he refused, and advised his two surviving brothers to refuse as well, to give precedence to her intended husband, Prince Albert of Saxe-Coburg and Gotha. Ernest argued that the standing of the various royal families had been settled at the Congress of Vienna and that the King of Hanover should not have to yield to one whom he described as a "paper Royal Highness". The act which naturalised Albert as a British subject left the question of his precedence unresolved.

Matters came to a head when Ernest returned for what would prove to be his only visit to England as King of Hanover, in 1843. He was welcomed warmly, everywhere but at the Palace. At the wedding of Princess Augusta of Cambridge, he attempted to insist on a superior place to that of Prince Albert. The young prince said that he settled things with a "strong push", carefully writing his name on the certificate under the Queen's, so close to his wife's as to leave no space for the King's signature. The King apparently held no grudge, as he invited Albert for a stroll in the park. When Albert demurred on the grounds that they might be jostled by crowds, the King replied, "When I lived here I was quite as unpopular as you are and they never bothered me." Shortly after the wedding, the King injured himself in a fall, with Albert writing to his brother, "Happily he fell over some stones in Kew and damaged some ribs." This injury spared him further contact with Victoria and Albert. During his visit, the King found time to take his place as Duke of Cumberland in the House of Lords. Victoria recorded in her journal that the King had stated when asked if he would speak in the Lords, "No, I shall not, unless the Devil prompts me!" The Queen also recorded that though the King greatly enjoyed listening to the debates, he did not himself speak. The King made a point of welcoming British visitors to Hanover and when one Englishwoman told him that she had been lost in the city, the King denied that this was possible, as "the whole country is no larger than a fourpenny bit."

The monarchs engaged in one more battle—over jewels left by Queen Charlotte. Queen Victoria, who possessed them, took the position that they belonged to the British Crown. King Ernest maintained that they were to go to the heir male, that is, himself. The matter was arbitrated, and just as the arbitrators were about to announce a decision in Hanover's favour, one of the arbitrators died, voiding the decision. Despite the King's request for a new panel, Victoria refused to permit one during the King's lifetime and took every opportunity to wear the jewels, causing the King to write to his friend, Lord Strangford, "The little Queen looked very fine, I hear, loaded down with my diamonds." The King's son and successor, King George V, pressed the matter, and in 1858, after another decision in Hanover's favour, the jewels were turned over to the Hanoverian ambassador.

== Later life, death, and memorial ==
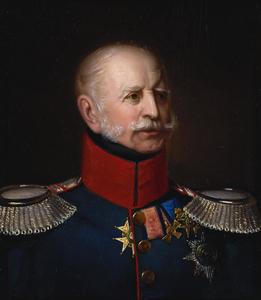
Ernest Augustus portrait, circa 1850

In 1851, the King undertook a number of journeys around Germany. He accepted an invitation from the Queen of Prussia to visit Charlottenburg Palace, near Berlin. He visited Mecklenburg-Schwerin for the christening of the Grand Duke's son and Lüneburg to inspect his old regiment. In June, Ernest celebrated his 80th birthday by playing host to Frederick William IV of Prussia. Late that summer, he visited Göttingen, where he opened a new hospital and was given a torchlight procession.

The King continued his interest in British affairs and wrote to Lord Strangford about the Great Exhibition of 1851:

The folly and absurdity of the Queen in allowing this trumpery must strike every sensible and well-thinking mind, and I am astonished the ministers themselves do not insist on her at least going to Osborne during the Exhibition, as no human being can possibly answer for what may occur on the occasion. The idea ... must shock every honest and well-meaning Englishman. But it seems everything is conspiring to lower us in the eyes of Europe.

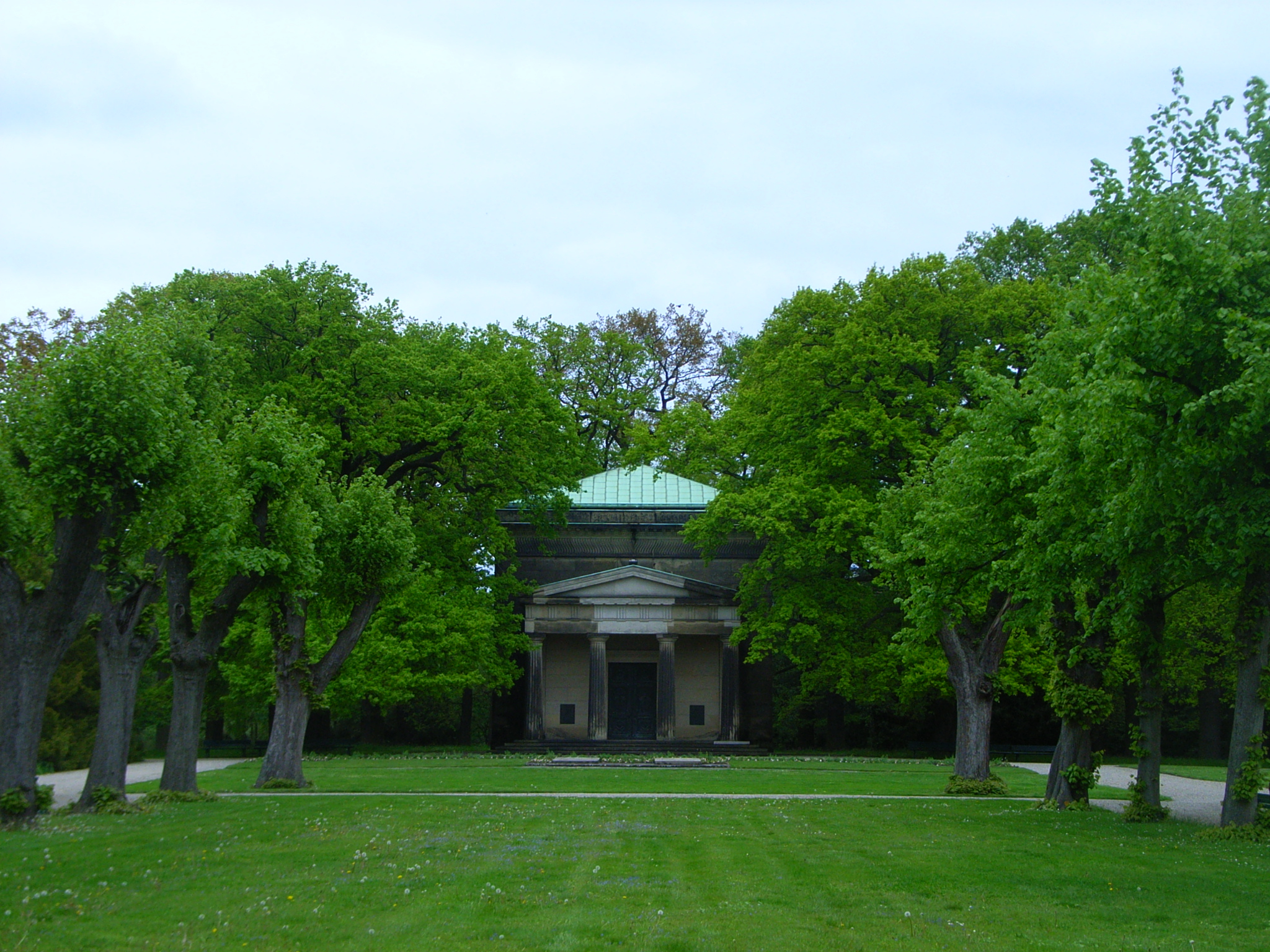
Mausoleum of King Ernest Augustus in the Berggarten of Herrenhausen Gardens

The King died on 18 November 1851, aged 80, after an illness of about a month. He was mourned greatly in Hanover; less so in the United Kingdom, where The Times omitted the customary black border to its front page and claimed "the good that can be said of the Royal dead is little or none." Both he and Queen Frederica rest in a mausoleum in the Berggarten of Herrenhausen Gardens.

A large equestrian statue of King Ernest Augustus may be found in a square named after him in front of Hanover Central Station, inscribed with his name and the words (in German) "To the father of the nation from his loyal people." It is a popular meeting place; in the local phrase, people arrange to meet unterm Schwanz or "under the tail".

Although The Times denigrated Ernest's career as Duke of Cumberland, it did speak well of his time as King of Hanover and of his success in keeping Hanover stable in 1848:

Above all, he possessed a resolute decision of character, which, however unfortunately it may have operated under different conditions, appeared to extraordinary advantage at the crisis of continental thrones. Bewildered by the revolutionary din, and oscillating ignominiously between fear and rage, resistance and concession, the clique of crowned heads suffered greatly by contrast with a Sovereign who at least knew his own mind and was prepared to abide by his opinions. In the European convulsions, therefore, King Ernest maintained the stability of his throne and the tranquillity of his people without damage from revolution or reaction. As Kings, indeed, are computed on the continent, he was an able and even a popular Monarch, and his memory may find, perhaps, in his ancestral dominions a sympathy which it would be vain to bespeak for it in the scenes of his manhood or the land of his birth.

== Titles, styles and honours ==
Coat of Arms as a British prince before 1837

Coat of Arms as King of Hanover

=== Titles and styles ===
- 5 June 1771 – 23 April 1799: His Royal Highness Prince Ernest Augustus
- 23 April 1799 – 20 June 1837: His Royal Highness The Duke of Cumberland and Teviotdale
- 20 June 1837 – 18 November 1851: His Majesty The King of Hanover

=== Honours ===
- United Kingdom and Kingdom of Hanover:
  - Knight of the Garter (KG) – nominated 2 June 1786
  - Privy Council of Great Britain (later of the United Kingdom) (PC) – 5 June 1799. (He was senior PC of the United Kingdom from 1847 until his death.)
  - Knight of the Order of the Thistle (KT)
  - Knight Grand Cross of the Order of the Bath (GCB) – 2 January 1815
  - Knight Grand Cross of the Royal Guelphic Order (GCH in British usage) (Kingdom of Hanover) – 12 August 1815; became sovereign of the order on succeeding to the Hanoverian throne 20 June 1837.
  - Knight of St Patrick (KP) – 20 August 1821
  - Order of St George (Kingdom of Hanover) – founder and sovereign of the order, 23 April 1839.
  - Fellow of the Royal Society (FRS) – 24 April 1828
- (Duchy of Anhalt) Ascanian duchies: Grand Cross of Albert the Bear – 13 January 1839
- Austrian Empire: Grand Cross of the Order of St. Stephen – 1839
- Baden: Grand Cross of the House Order of Fidelity – 1829
- Denmark: Knight of the Elephant – 7 July 1838
- (Saxe-Coburg and Gotha) (Duchy of Saxe-Altenburg) (Saxe-Meiningen) Ernestine duchies: Grand Cross of the Saxe-Ernestine House Order – August 1839
- Prussia:
  - Knight of the Black Eagle – 21 May 1815
  - Grand Cross of the Red Eagle
- Grand Duchy of Hesse: Grand Cross of the Ludwig Order
- Electorate of Hesse: Grand Cross of the Golden Lion – 20 September 1818
- Kingdom of Bavaria: Knight of St. Hubert – 1826
- Netherlands: Grand Cross of the Military William Order – 3 July 1849
- Russian Empire: Knight of St. Andrew – September 1819

== Issue ==
Name	Birth	Death	Notes
Princess Frederica of Cumberland	27 January 1817	27 January 1817	stillborn
Stillborn daughter	April 1818	April 1818	stillborn
George V of Hanover	27 May 1819	12 June 1878	Married in 1843, Marie of Saxe-Altenburg and had issue.

== Ancestry ==
Ancestors of Ernest Augustus, King of Hanover

8. George II of Great Britain
4. Frederick, Prince of Wales
9. Princess Caroline of Brandenburg-Ansbach
2. George III of the United Kingdom
10. Frederick II, Duke of Saxe-Gotha-Altenburg
5. Princess Augusta of Saxe-Gotha-Altenburg
11. Princess Magdalena Augusta of Anhalt-Zerbst
1. Ernest Augustus, King of Hanover
12. Adolphus Frederick II, Duke of Mecklenburg-Strelitz
6. Duke Charles Louis Frederick of Mecklenburg-Strelitz
13. Princess Christiane Emilie of Schwarzburg-Sondershausen
3. Princess Charlotte of Mecklenburg-Strelitz
14. Ernest Frederick I, Duke of Saxe-Hildburghausen
7. Princess Elisabeth Albertine of Saxe-Hildburghausen
15. Countess Sophia Albertine of Erbach-Erbach

== Bibliography ==
- Bird, Anthony (1966), The Damnable Duke of Cumberland, London: Barrie and Rockliff, OCLC 2188257
- Fulford, Roger (1933), Royal Dukes, London: Gerald Duckworth & Co, OCLC 499977206
- Grant, James (1836), Random Recollections of the House of Lords, London: Smith, Elder & Co., ISBN 9780598924582, OCLC 60725235
- Horst, Dietmar, ed. (2000), Hanover: The Red Thread Through the City Centre, Hanover: Neue Medien Hannover
- Patten, Robert L. (1992), George Cruikshank's Life, Times, and Art: 1792–1835, Volume 1; Volumes 1792–1835, New Brunswick, New Jersey: Rutgers University Press, pp. 116–117, ISBN 978-0-8135-1813-8
- Van der Kiste, John (2004), George III's Children (revised ed.), Stroud, United Kingdom: Sutton Publishing Ltd, ISBN 978-0-7509-3438-1
- Wardroper, John (2002), Wicked Ernest, London: Shelfmark Books, ISBN 978-0-9526093-3-9
- Weir, Alison (1996), Britain's Royal Families: The Complete Genealogy, Revised edition, Random House, ISBN 978-0-7126-7448-5
- Wilkinson, Charles (1886), Reminiscences of the Court and Times of King Ernest of Hanover, Volume 1, Hurst & Blackett, OCLC 3501366
- Willis, Geoffrey (1954), Ernest Augustus Duke of Cumberland and King of Hanover, London: Arthur Barker, OCLC 3385875
- Ziegler, Philip (1971), King William IV, London: Collins, ISBN 978-0-00-211934-4

Online sources

- Notes and Queries, London: Oxford University Press, 1872
- "Mausoleum", Herrenhäuser Gärten (in German), Hannover.de
- "Death of the King of Hanover" (PDF), The Times, 12 December 1851 – via The New York Times
- "No. 15126". The London Gazette. 23 April 1799. p. 372.

Ernest Augustus, King of Hanover House of Hanover Cadet branch of the House of Welf Born: 5 June 1771 Died: 18 November 1851
Regnal titles
Preceded by William IV	King of Hanover; 1837–1851	Succeeded by George V
Peerage of Great Britain
New creation	Duke of Cumberland and Teviotdale; 1799–1851	Succeeded by George V of Hanover
Peerage of Ireland
New creation	Earl of Armagh; 1799–1851	Succeeded by George V of Hanover
Military offices
Preceded by The Lord Dorchester	Colonel of the 15th (King's Own) Light Dragoons; 1801–1827	Succeeded by Sir Colquhoun Grant
Preceded by The Duke of Wellington	Colonel of the Royal Regiment of Horse Guards (The Blues); 1827–1830	Succeeded by The Lord Hill
Academic offices
Preceded by The Duke of Gloucester and Edinburgh	Chancellor of the University of Dublin; 1805–1851	Succeeded by Lord John Beresford
Non-profit organization positions
Preceded by The Earl O'Neill	Grand Master of the Orange Institution of Ireland; 1828–1836	Succeeded by The Earl of Roden
Honorary titles
Preceded by The Earl of Harrowby	Senior Privy Counsellor (UK); 1847–1851	Succeeded by The Marquess of Lansdowne
