= History of Hanover (region) =

Hanover (German: Hannover) is a territory that was at various times a principality within the Holy Roman Empire, an electorate within the same, an independent kingdom, and a subordinate province within the Kingdom of Prussia. The territory was named after its capital, the city of Hanover, which was the principal town of the region from 1636. In contemporary usage, the name is used only for the city. Most of the historical territory of Hanover forms the greater part of the German state of Lower Saxony but excludes certain areas.

== Formation ==
Hanover was formed by the union of several dynastic divisions of the Duchy of Brunswick-Lüneburg, with the sole exception of Brunswick-Wolfenbüttel. From 1714 to 1837, it was joined in a personal union with the United Kingdom, which terminated upon the accession in Britain of Queen Victoria, as in Hanover, a female could not rule if there was a male descendant. Until 1803, when it was occupied by French and Prussian troops, Hanover was a constituent state of the Holy Roman Empire; when it regained independence in 1814, Hanover was raised to a kingdom, which lasted until 1866.

== Duchy of Brunswick and Lüneburg ==
The title "Duke of Brunswick and Lüneburg" (German: Herzog zu Braunschweig und Lüneburg) was held, from 1235, by various members of the Welf family who ruled several small territories in northwest Germany. These holdings did not have all of the formal characteristics of a state, being neither compact nor indivisible. When several sons of a duke competed for power, the lands were often divided between them; when a branch of the family lost power or became extinct, the lands were reallocated among surviving members of the family; different dukes might also exchange territories. The territories were named after notable towns where the dukes had (or had had at one time) their residences, e.g. Calenberg, Göttingen, Grubenhagen, Lüneburg, Wolfenbüttel. The unifying element of all these territories was that they were ruled by male-line descendants of Duke Otto I, Duke of Brunswick-Lüneburg, nephew of the Holy Roman Emperor Otto IV.

=== Principality of Lüneburg ===
The line that would lead to the House of Hanover was that of Bernard, one of the three sons of Duke Magnus II who had jointly ruled a united Duchy of Brunswick since 1388, but who partitioned the territory in 1428 and 1432. Bernard received the territory of Lüneburg, whose principal town was Celle.

From 1527 until 1642 the Principality of Harburg, seated in Harburg, was partitioned from Lüneburg. In 1569, Lüneburg was divided between Henry III (line of Dannenberg) and William VI (line of Lüneburg), the sons of Ernest the Confessor, Bernard's great-great-grandson.

A distant cousin of the line of Lüneburg, Frederick Ulrich, who ruled the territories of Wolfenbüttel and Calenberg, died in 1634. After some dispute, his territories were divided in 1635 between the Dannenberg and Celle branches of the Lüneburg line. Henry III's son Augustus became Duke of Brunswick-Wolfenbüttel and his descendants eventually ruled the Duchy of Brunswick.

William's first four sons ruled Lüneburg in sequence from their father's death in 1592 to 1648. The fifth son, George received the territories of Calenberg and Göttingen in 1635. In 1636 he moved the seat of the Dukes of Calenberg from Pattensen to the town of Hannover in the Calenberg territory. This was the nucleus of the state of Hanover, though the territory would have to wait until 1814 before receiving Hanover as its official name.

In 1648, the Duke of Calenberg inherited Lüneburg from his uncle Frederick, the last survivor of William's five sons. From 1648 to 1705, Lüneburg (the larger territory) was held by the senior of the Lüneburg line, and Calenberg by the next junior.

In 1692, the Emperor promised to raise the Duke of Calenberg, Ernest Augustus, Duke of Brunswick-Lüneburg to the rank of Elector. This promotion did not become effective until it was recognized by the Imperial Diet in 1708, ten years after Ernest Augustus's death.

In the meantime, his son, George Louis, inherited Lüneburg from his uncle in 1705, doubling Hanover's size.

Dukes of Brunswick and Lüneburg in Lüneburg and Calenberg
Image	Name	Date	Notes
	William	1559–1592	Ruled with his brother Henry to 1569, and alone Lüneburg thereafter.
	Ernest II	1592–1611	Eldest son of William, ruled Lüneburg.
	Christian	1611–1633	Second son of William, ruled Lüneburg.
	Augustus	1633–1636	Third son of William, ruled Lüneburg
	Frederick	1636–1648	Fourth son of William, ruled Lüneburg
	George	1635–1641	Fifth son of William. Ruled in Calenberg and Göttingen, moved his ducal seat to Hannover in 1636.
	Christian Louis	1641–1665	Son of preceding. Ruled in Calenberg to 1648, when he inherited the Principality of Lüneburg from his uncle Frederick and ruled there thereafter.
	George William	1648–1705	Brother of preceding. Ruled in Calenberg to 1665, and Lüneburg thereafter. Acquired the Duchy of Saxe-Lauenburg in 1689.
	John Frederick	1665–1679	Brother of preceding. Ruled in Calenberg only.
	Ernest Augustus I	1679–1698	Brother of preceding. Ruled in Calenberg. Awarded the rank of Elector in 1692.
	George Louis	1698–1708	Son of preceding. Inherited the territory of Lüneburg and the duchy of Saxe-Lauenburg from his uncle George William in 1705. Installed as Elector in 1708.

== Electorate of Hanover 1708–1814 ==
In 1692, the Holy Roman Emperor, Leopold I, elevated George's son, Duke Ernest Augustus to the rank of Elector of the Empire as a reward for aid given in the Nine Years' War. There were protests against the addition of a new Elector, and the elevation did not become official (with the approval of the Imperial Diet) until 1708, in the person of Ernest Augustus's son, George Louis. Though the Elector's titles were properly Duke of Brunswick-Lüneburg and Elector of the Holy Roman Empire, he is commonly referred to as the Elector of Hanover after his residence.

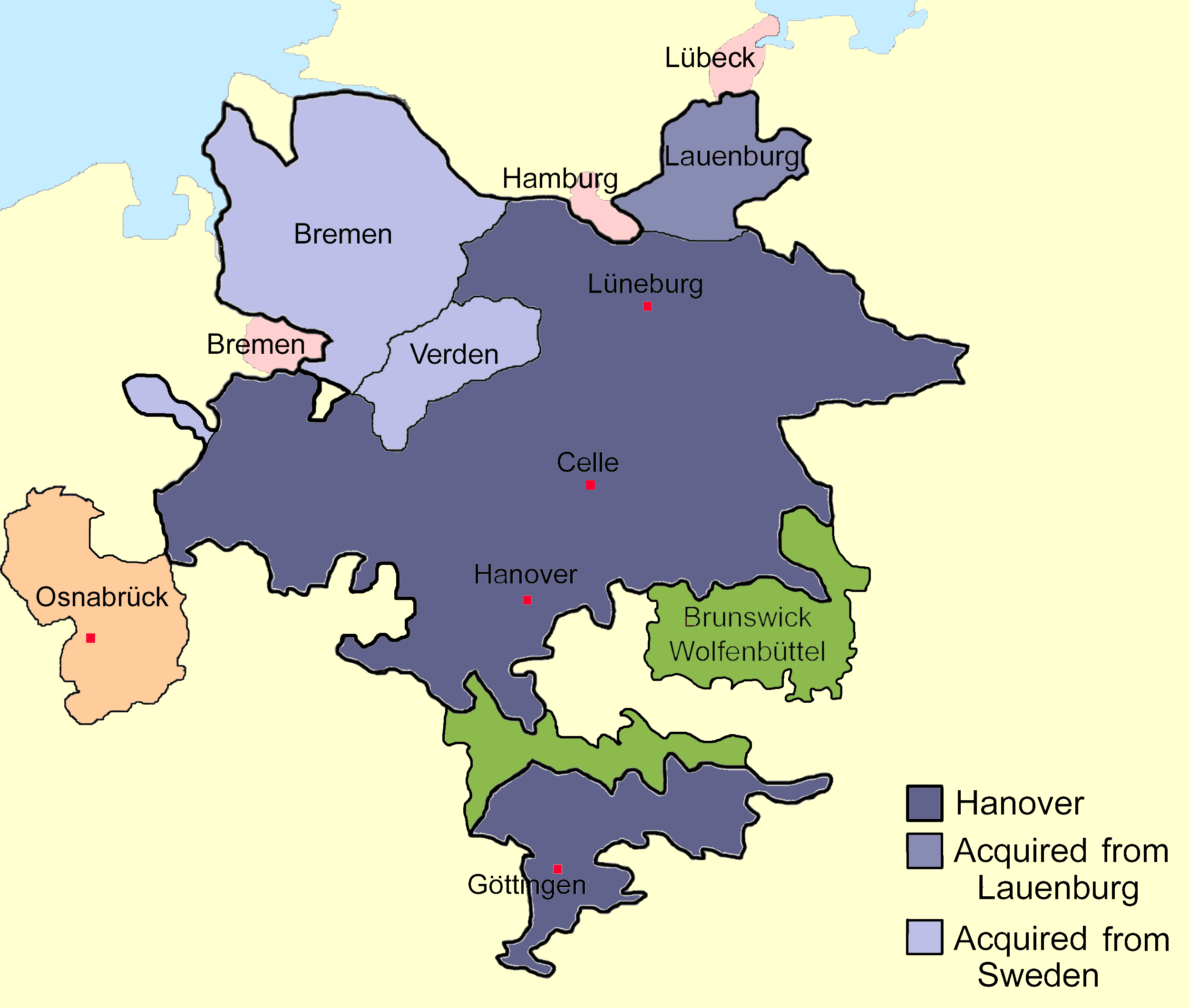
Sketch map of Hanover, c. 1720, showing the relative locations of Hanover, Brunswick-Wolfenbüttel, and the Prince-Bishopric of Osnabrück. Hanover acquired Bremen-Verden in 1719.

The Electorate was legally bound to be indivisible: it could add to its territory, but not alienate territory or be split up among several heirs; and its succession was to follow male primogeniture. The territory assigned to the Electorate included the Brunswick-Lüneburg principalities of Calenberg, Grubenhagen, and Lüneburg (even though at the time Lüneburg was ruled by Ernest Augustus's older brother) and the counties of Diepholz and Hoya.

George Louis became king of Great Britain in 1714 (see House of Hanover). The influence of the electors in Germany grew also: they inherited the formerly Swedish territories of Bremen and Verden in 1719. As part of the German Mediatisation of 1803, the Electorate received the Prince-Bishopric of Osnabrück.

The Electorate became a battleground during the Seven Years' War following the French Invasion of Hanover. In the Convention of Klosterzeven it was agreed that Hanover should be neutral with large parts of the Electorate occupied by French forces. George II subsequently revoked the convention, and the re-formed Army of Observation counter-attacked and drove the French from the Electorate. Subsequent French attacks were repulsed.

In 1803, the Electorate of Hanover was occupied by France after the Convention of Artlenburg. From 1807 to 1813, the Hanoverian territory was part of the Kingdom of Westphalia. However, the government of George III did not recognize the French annexation (being at war continuously with France through the entire period) and Hanoverian ministers continued to operate from London. The Hanoverian government maintained its own separate diplomatic service, which maintained links to countries such as Austria and Prussia, with whom the United Kingdom itself was technically at war. The Hanoverian Army was dissolved, but many of the officers and soldiers went to England, where they formed the King's German Legion (KGL). The KGL was the only German army to fight continually throughout the Napoleonic wars against the French, and played an important part in the Battle of Waterloo in 1815.

Although the Holy Roman Empire was dissolved in 1806, George III's government did not consider the dissolution to be final, and he continued to be styled "Elector of Hanover" down to 1814.

Electors of Hanover
Image	Name	Date	Notes
	George I	1708–1727	George Louis, son of Ernest Augustus I. Became King of Great Britain in 1714. Acquired Bremen and Verden in 1719.
	George II	1727–1760	Son of preceding.
	George III	1760–1814	Grandson of preceding. Became King of the United Kingdom (including Ireland) in 1801. Abandoned Electoral title and became King of Hanover in 1814.

== Kingdom of Hanover 1814–1866 ==
In 1813, George III was restored to his Hanoverian territories, and in October 1814 they were erected into the independent Kingdom of Hanover at the Congress of Vienna. The Congress of Vienna instituted a territorial exchange between Hanover and Prussia, in which Hanover increased its area substantially, gaining the Bishopric of Hildesheim, East Frisia, the Lower County of Lingen and the northern part of the Bishopric of Münster. It lost the parts of the Duchy of Lauenburg to the right of the Elbe and several small exclaves in the east.

The personal union with the United Kingdom ended in 1837 on the accession of Queen Victoria because the semi-Salic succession laws in Hanover prevented a female from inheriting the throne if there was a male descendant.

In the Austro-Prussian War of 1866, Hanover was annexed by Prussia and became the Province of Hanover.

Kings of Hanover
Image	Name	Date	Notes
	George III	1814–1820	George III was mentally unfit during these years, and power was exercised by a regency.
	George IV	1820–1830	Son of preceding. Regent 1811–1820.
	William IV	1830–1837	Brother of preceding. Last monarch to rule both Hanover and the United Kingdom.
	Ernest Augustus	1837–1851	Brother of preceding. The accession of Queen Victoria separated the crowns of the United Kingdom and Hanover, and the latter passed to her uncle.
	George V	1851–1866	Son of preceding. Lost his territories to Prussia in the Austro-Prussian War.

== Province of Hanover 1866–1946 ==
The Province of Hanover (German: Provinz Hannover) was a province of the Kingdom of Prussia and the Free State of Prussia from 1868 to 1946.

In 1946, the British military administration made the Province of Hanover the main part of the land of Lower Saxony, along with the states of Oldenburg, Brunswick, and Schaumburg-Lippe, with the city of Hanover as the capital of the new state.

== See also ==
- Province of Hanover
- King's German Legion
- House of Hanover
- Ernst zu Münster
- German Chancery
- Timeline of Hanover city

== General references ==
- Vincent, Benjamin (1910). "Hanover". Haydn's Dictionary of Dates (25th ed.). London: Ward, Lock & Co. hdl:2027/uc2.ark:/13960/t41r6xh8t.
