= Berggarten =

Garden in Hanover, Lower Saxony

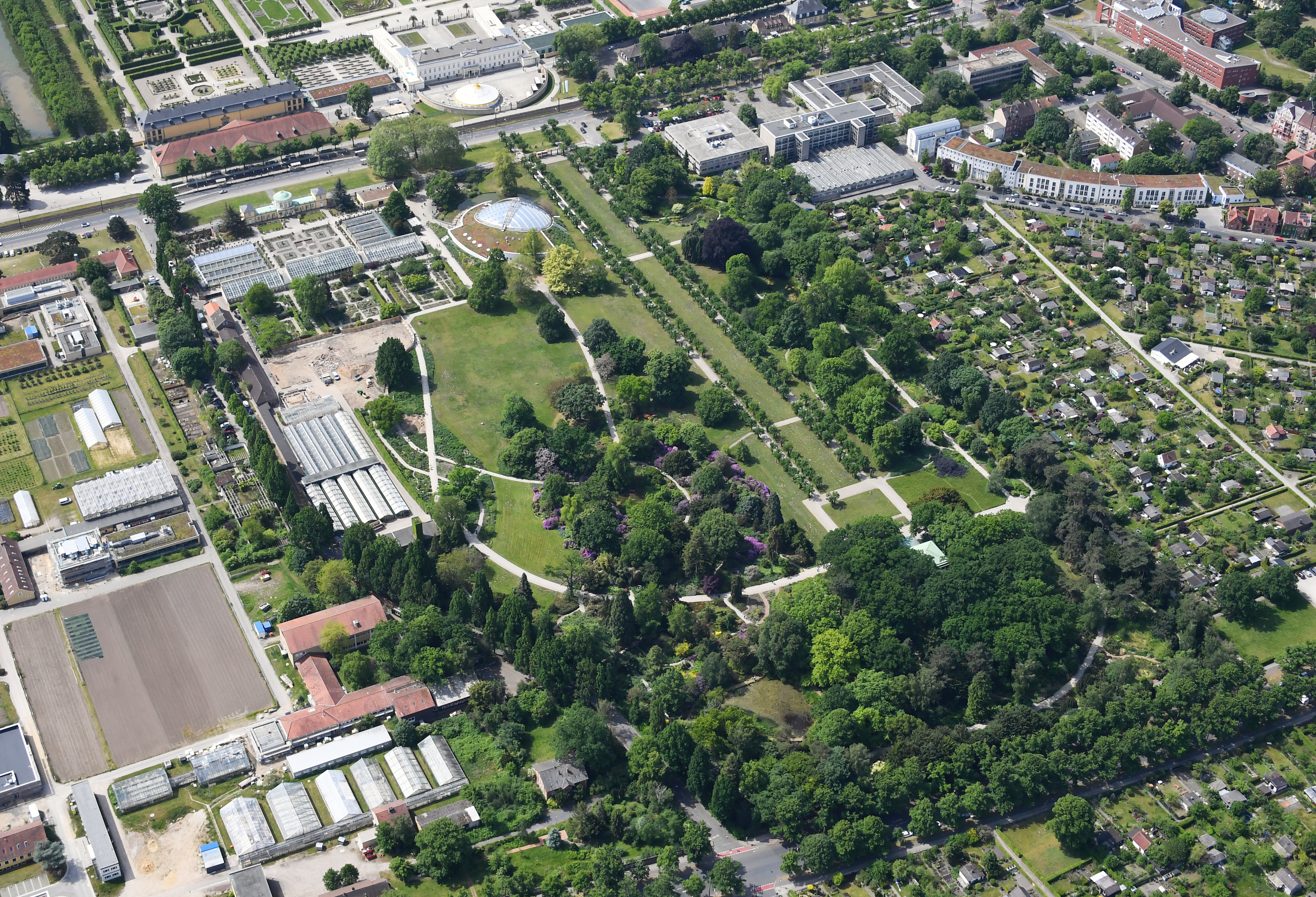
- Aerial view of the Berggarten from the northeast
- Interactive map of Berggarten
- Location: Herrenhausen, Lower Saxony, Germany
- Coordinates: 52°23′39″N 9°41′58″E
- Established: 1666
- Website: www.berggarten-hannover.de

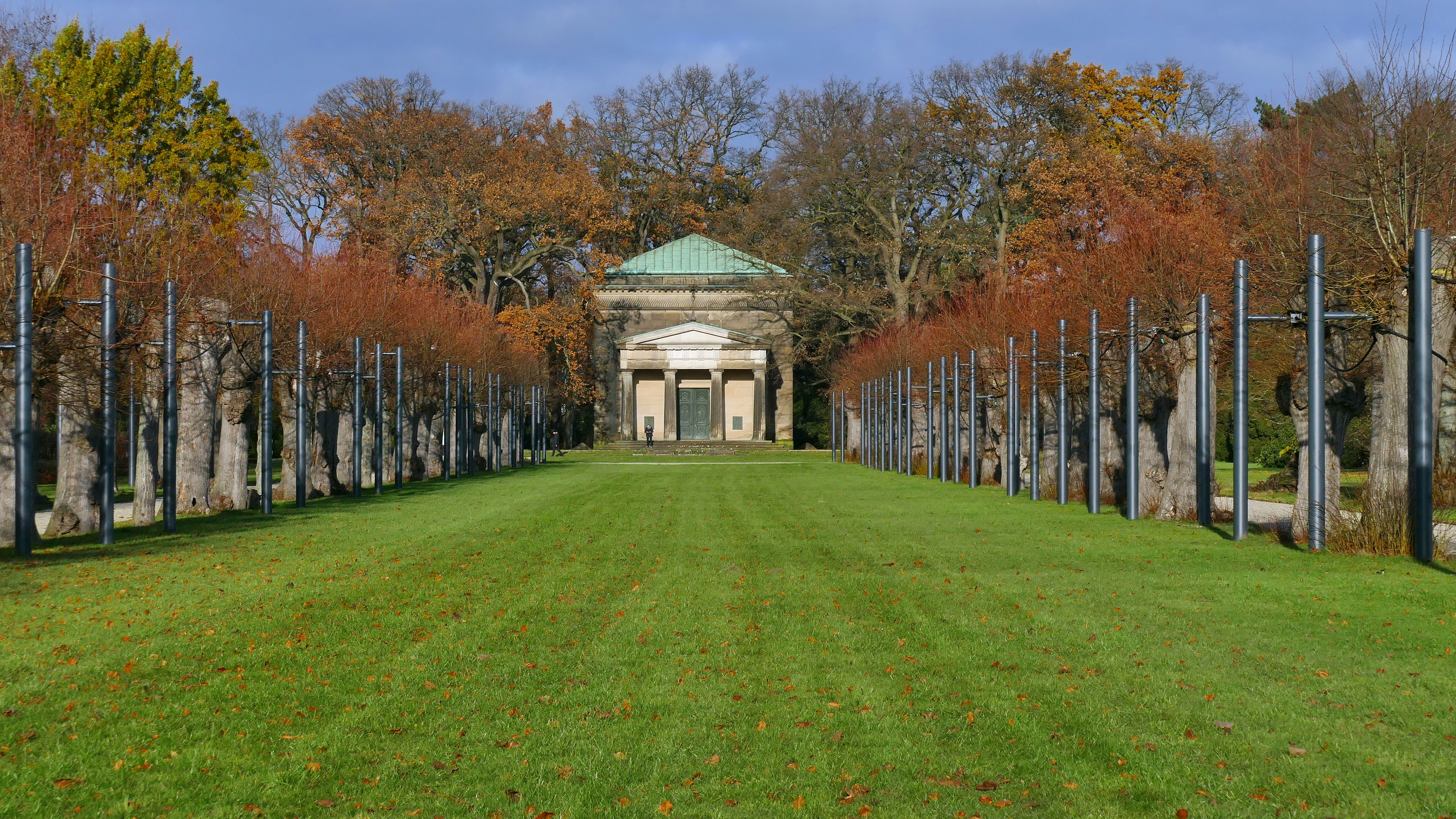
Mausoleum in Berggarten in 2019

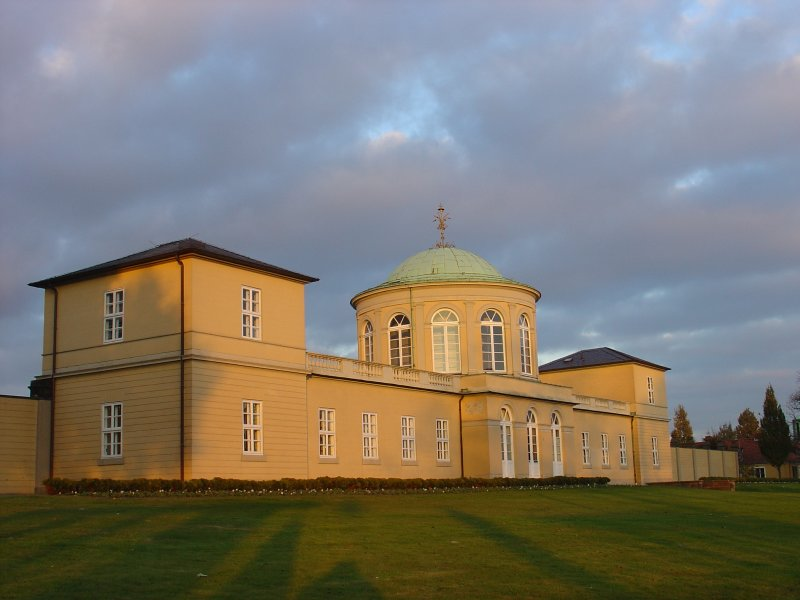
Library Building in the Berggarten

The Hill Garden (German: Berggarten) is a historic botanical garden, one of the gardens of the Herrenhäuser Gärten, around the residence Herrenhäuser Schloss in Herrenhausen, now part of Hanover, Lower Saxony, Germany. The garden was first created in 1666 as a vegetable garden on a hill north of the palace, and then transformed into a garden for exotic plants. In 1750, it was developed into a botanical garden, with some unusual trees from the period still surviving. It features a palm house, first built in 1846, and a mausoleum, where members of the royal family were interred. Damaged by air raids in World War II, the gardens were restored. In 2000, a house for rain forest-themed gardens was added, which was transformed to an aquarium in 2007.

== History ==
The Berggarten was created as part of the Herrenhäuser Gärten of the residence Herrenhäuser Schloss in Herrenhausen in 1666 as a vegetable garden on a hill north of the palace. Sophia of Hanover later transformed it into a garden for exotic plants. In 1686, a conservatory was built.

Besides aesthetic purposes, the garden was a ground to experiment with the breeding of plants native to more southern regions. While the growing of rice failed, crops like tobacco and mulberry were successfully grown. The silkworms in Hameln were fed by mulberry leaves from the Berggarten. In 1750, the Küchengarten in Linden (now also part of Hanover) grew produce for the palace, and the Berggarten was turned into a botanical garden.

Between 1817 and 1820, a caretaker's house was built within the garden. Construction of a Palmenhaus (palm house) was begun in 1846, a conservatory for palms designed by court architect Georg Ludwig Friedrich Laves. Within five years of its completion in 1849, the building housed the most valuable and extensive collection of palms in Europe. A mausoleum, also designed by Laves, was built from 1842 to 1847. King Ernest Augustus, who died one year after completion, was interred there with his wife Queen Frederica. In 1845 and 1846, walls and fences were added to provide seclusion. The palm house was replaced by a larger building in 1880. At 30 metres (98 ft) high, it was the biggest greenhouse at the time.

The garden was severely damaged by air raids in World War II. The Palmenhaus had to be demolished in 1950. In 1952, the Garden Library was built which later became the seat of the garden's management. In 1957, further members of the Royal Family of Hanover, including King George I of Great Britain and his parents, were interred in the garden's mausoleum. The remains of John Frederick, Duke of Brunswick-Luneburg, his daughter Anna Sophie (1670–1672), Ernest Augustus, Elector of Brunswick-Luneburg and his wife Sophia of the Palatinate, their younger son Ernest Augustus, Duke of York and Albany and Princess Charlotte of Clarence (1819–1819), daughter of William IV of the United Kingdom, were interred, while the graves of Ernest Augustus, Duke of Brunswick and his wife Princess Viktoria Luise of Prussia are in front of the mausoleum.

In 2000, a house for exotic plants was completed, called Regenwaldhaus (Rain forest house), on the occasion of Expo 2000. It housed a tropical landscape containing plants, butterflies and birds, in several themed gardens. In 2007, it was transformed to an aquarium for deep-sea fish, Sea-Life.
