= Johann Philipp von Hattorf =

Hanoverian minister

Johann Philipp von Hattorf (6 March 1682 – 3 September 1737) was a Hanoverian minister and head of the German Chancery in London from 1723 until 1737.

== Life and career ==
He was the son of Johann von Hattorf and Anna Mülle, and married Marie Margarethe von Molan on 29 July 1705. Hattorf was one of fifteen ministers and advisers who came to Great Britain with George I in 1714. From that year until 1723, he served as secretary of the German Chancery with Andreas Gottlieb von Bernstorff as head. In July 1719, Hattorf and Northern Secretary James Stanhope, 1st Earl Stanhope, pushed Bernstorff out of office, leaving Hanoverian politics to fall into the hands of British ministers.

Hans Caspar von Bothmer took over as de facto head of the Chancery in 1720 until Bernstorff formally retired in 1723. From that time on, Hattorf was the official Chancery office head, although Bothmer continued in his role as unofficial head until his own death in 1732. Unlike his predecessor, Hattorf lacked political confidence during the reigns of George I and George II and died quietly in 1737 at Hampton Court, being succeeded in his role by Ernst von Steinberg. He left behind one daughter, Johanne Louise.

== Sources ==
- Jeremy Black, George II: Puppet of the Politicians? (Exeter: UP, 2007).
- Ragnhild Hatton, George I (New Haven, CT: Yale University Press, 2001).

Political offices
Preceded by Andreas Gottlieb von Bernstorff	Head of the German Chancery in London; 1723–1737	Succeeded by Ernst von Steinberg
