= Stade =

Stade Hansestadt Stade Hansestadt Stood
- Town
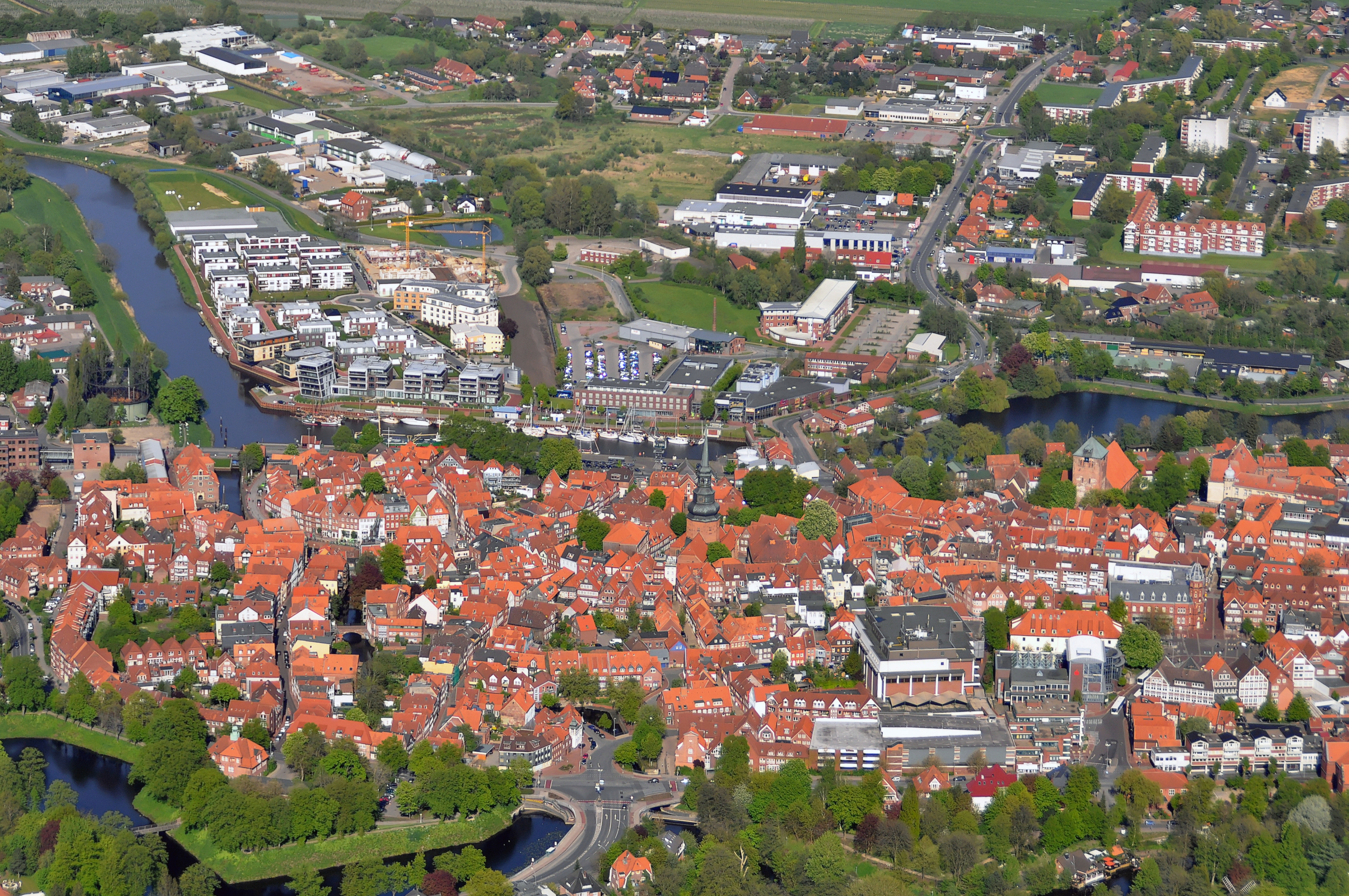
- Aerial view of Stade

- Coat of arms

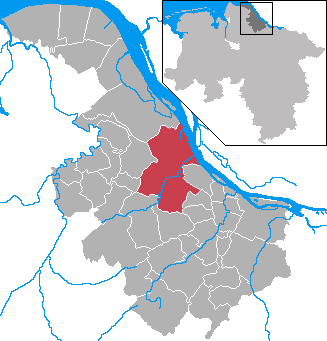
- Location of Stade within Stade district
- Interactive map of Stade
- Location within Germany Location within Lower Saxony
- Coordinates: 53°36′3″N 9°28′35″E
- Country: Germany
- State: Lower Saxony
- District: Stade

Government
  - Mayor (2019–24): Sönke Hartlef (CDU)

Area
  - Total: 110.07 km^{2} (42.50 sq mi)
- Elevation: 9 m (30 ft)

Population (2025-12-31)
  - Total: 48,699
  - Density: 442.44/km^{2} (1,145.9/sq mi)
- Time zone: UTC+01:00 (CET)
  - Summer (DST): UTC+02:00 (CEST)
- Postal codes: 21680, 21682–21684
- Dialling codes: 04141, 04146
- Vehicle registration: STD
- Website: www.stade.de

Stade (German pronunciation: [ˈʃtaːdə]; Low German: Stood), officially the Hanseatic City of Stade (German: Hansestadt Stade, Low German: Hansestadt Stood), is a city in Lower Saxony in northern Germany. First mentioned in records in 934, it is the seat of the district (Landkreis) which bears its name. It is located roughly 45 km (28 mi) to the west of Hamburg and belongs to that city's wider metropolitan region. Within the area of the city are the urban districts of Bützfleth, Hagen, Haddorf and Wiepenkathen, each of which have a council (Ortsrat) of their own with some autonomous decision-making rights.

Stade is located in the lower regions of the river Elbe. It is also on the German Timber-Frame Road.

== History ==
The first human settlers came to the Stade area in 30,000 BC.

=== Medieval period ===
Swedish and Danish Vikings under Eric the Victorious conquered Stade and looted the town during the 990s. Many prominent Saxons were taken back as slaves by Swedish troops. A majority of Vikings withdrew after taking plenty of plunder. A minor part of the Swedish and Danish forces stayed but were later defeated by reinforcements sent by the emperor.

From 1180 Stade belonged to the Prince-Archbishopric of Bremen. In early 1208 King Valdemar II of Denmark and his troops conquered Stade. In August Valdemar II's cousin, being in enmity with the king, the then Prince-Archbishop Valdemar reconquered the city only to lose it again soon afterwards to Valdemar II. In 1209 Emperor Otto IV persuaded his ally Valdemar II to withdraw to north of the Elbe, and the deposed Prince-Archbishop Valdemar took Stade.

On 2 May 1209 Otto IV granted important town privileges to Stade. Otto IV confirmed the burghers to be personally free and recognised them as constituting a political entity under their own law, the burgenses and optimi cives of Stade. Property within the municipal boundaries could not be subjected to feudal overlordship and was to be freely inherited without feudal claims to reversion. Fair juridical procedures were constituted and maximal fines fixed. Otto IV committed himself to preventing burghers from being taken as hostages and to liberating captured burghers.

After Otto IV had changed his mind and reinvested Prince-Archbishop Valdemar with the See in 1211, Valdemar II recaptured Stade. In 1213 Otto's elder brother Count Palatine Henry V of the Rhine, reconquered Stade for the Prince-Archbishop. In 1215 Henry repelled another Danish attack on Stade. In the winter of 1216 Valdemar II and his Danish troops, unable to take the city of Stade, ravaged the County of Stade. From then on Stade remained a part of the Prince-Archbishopric of Bremen.

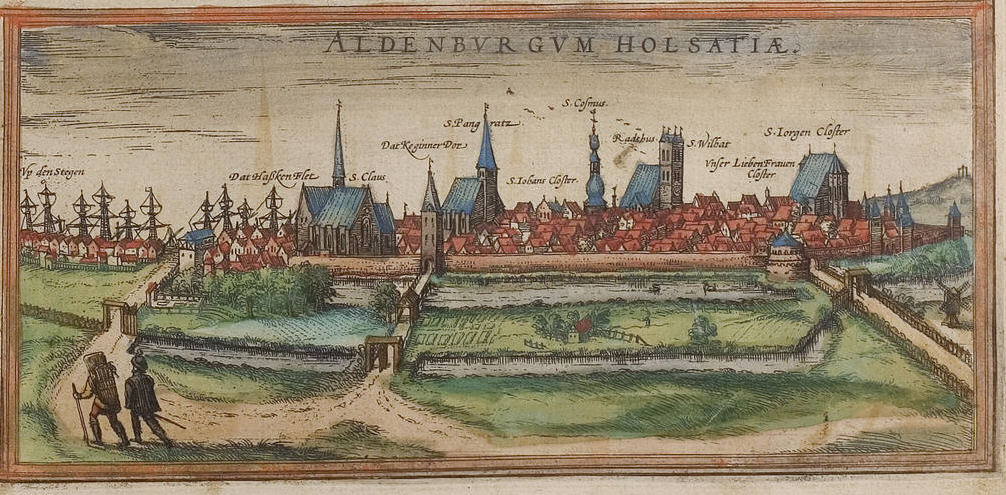
1572 drawing of Stade. "S. Cosmus" and "S. Wilhat" refer to St. Cosmae et Damiani Church and St. Wilhadi, respectively.

From the 13th century to the late 17th century, Stade was a prominent member of the Hanseatic League, but was later eclipsed by Hamburg. In 1611 the city signed a contract with Sephardic Jews, allowing the foundation of a community. In 1613, Johann Friedrich, Administrator of the Prince-Archbishopric, followed by settling Ashkenazic Jews in the city, but with the turmoil of Catholic conquest and Lutheran reconquest the last archival traces of Jews date from 1630. In 1648, by the Treaty of Westphalia, the Prince-Archbishopric of Bremen underwent a constitutional transformation from a prince-bishopric into a monarchy, the Duchy of Bremen. The duchy and the neighbouring Principality of Verden, colloquially referred to as Bremen-Verden, were granted by the Treaty of Westphalia as an appanage to the Swedish crown. Stade, already under Swedish occupation since 1645, was a part of the Swedish province of Bremen-Verden-Wildeshausen from 1645 to 1712, and some of the buildings built by the Swedes are still in use today.

=== Swedish rule ===
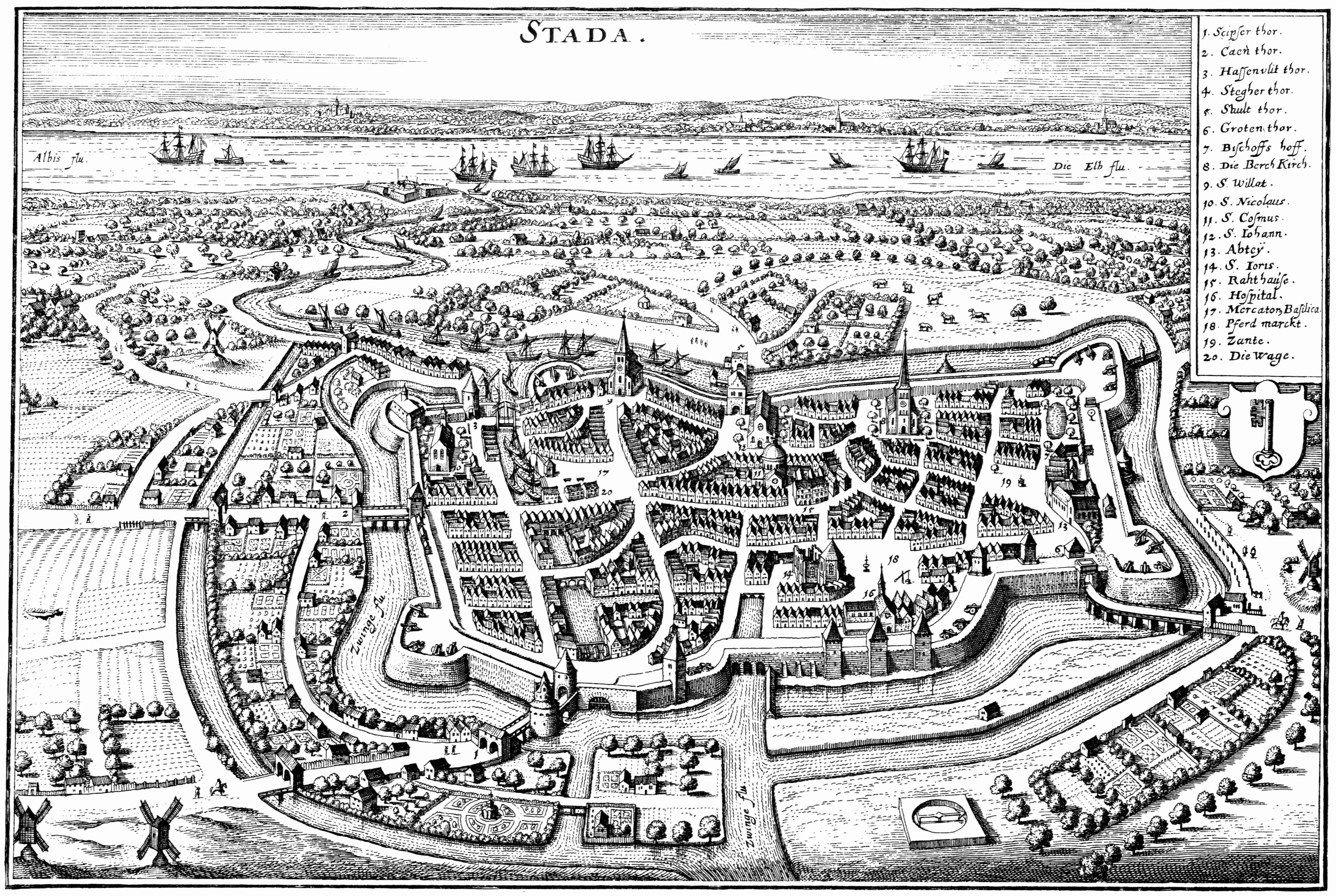
Stade in 1640 (drawing by Matthäus Merian)

Stade's heyday lasted until the Thirty Years' War. In 1628 Tilly conquered the town; shortly thereafter, Sweden took possession of it until 1636. After a period of Danish occupation, Sweden finally recaptured it in 1643 and was also officially granted possession of it, together with the Archbishopric of Bremen, in the Peace of Westphalia. Two-thirds of the town were razed in the great town fire on 26 May 1659. The town was rebuilt again to the same plan.

From 1675 to 1676, in the Swedish-Brandenburg War, Swedish Stade was conquered during a campaign by Denmark-Norway and several states of the Holy Roman Empire and remained in allied hands until the end of that war in 1679. Stade, as the headquarters of the Swedish Stadhalter, was besieged from early April 1676 to 13 Aug 1676. In the wake of the Treaty of Saint Germain in 1679, Stade was once again awarded to Sweden.

The Elbe customs station near Stade, in Brunshausen at the mouth of the Schwinge, played special role in trading on the River Elbe from the period of the archbishopric. In 1663, the Swedes stationed an Elbe customs frigate as a permanent patrol ship. This arrangement continued to exist under various rulers until 1850 and the customs station on the Schwinge fieldworks itself existed until 1865.

Swedish sovereignty ended in 1712. Danish troops besieged the town in the Great Northern War and shelled it from 29 August to 7 September 1712, resulting in the destruction of 152 houses, a quarter of the built-up area.

During the Swedish times Stade was the capital of the province.

=== Danish rule ===
In 1712 Denmark-Norway conquered Stade and the whole of Bremen-Verden. Stade remained Bremen-Verden's capital also after the Danes ceded it to the Electorate of Hanover in 1715. When in 1823 Bremen-Verden was replaced by new administrative forms, Stade continued to be the capital of the Stade region.

In 1355 and in 1712, Stade suffered from plague epidemics, which killed at least 30–40% of the city's population.

=== Late modern period ===
In 1757 following the French Invasion of Hanover, the Hanoverian Army of Observation under Prince William, Duke of Cumberland, and the Privy Council of Hanover (government) took shelter in Stade. Cumberland prepared to defend the town before accepting the Convention of Klosterzeven which brought about a temporary armistice.

By the end of the 17th century Ashkenazi Jews reappeared in Stade. In 1842 the Kingdom of Hanover granted equal rights to Jews and promoted the building up of Jewish congregations and a regional superstructure (rabbinate) within a nationwide scope. The Jews in Stade regarded this as progress and a burden alike, because prior to this they had not employed any rabbi or religious teacher due to the implicit financial burden. In 1845 – according to the new law – a land-rabbinate, under Land-Rabbi Joseph Heilbut, was established in the city, serving 16 Jewish congregations, which were founded over the years in the whole Stade Region, with altogether 1,250 Jews in 1864 (highest number ever reached). The local authorities now requested, that the Jewish congregations establish synagogues and Jewish education for the pupils.

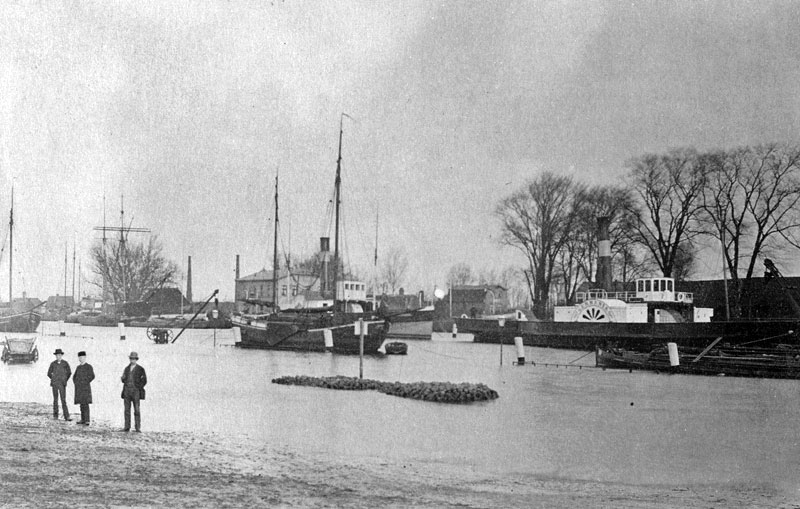
New harbour during the 1894 flooding

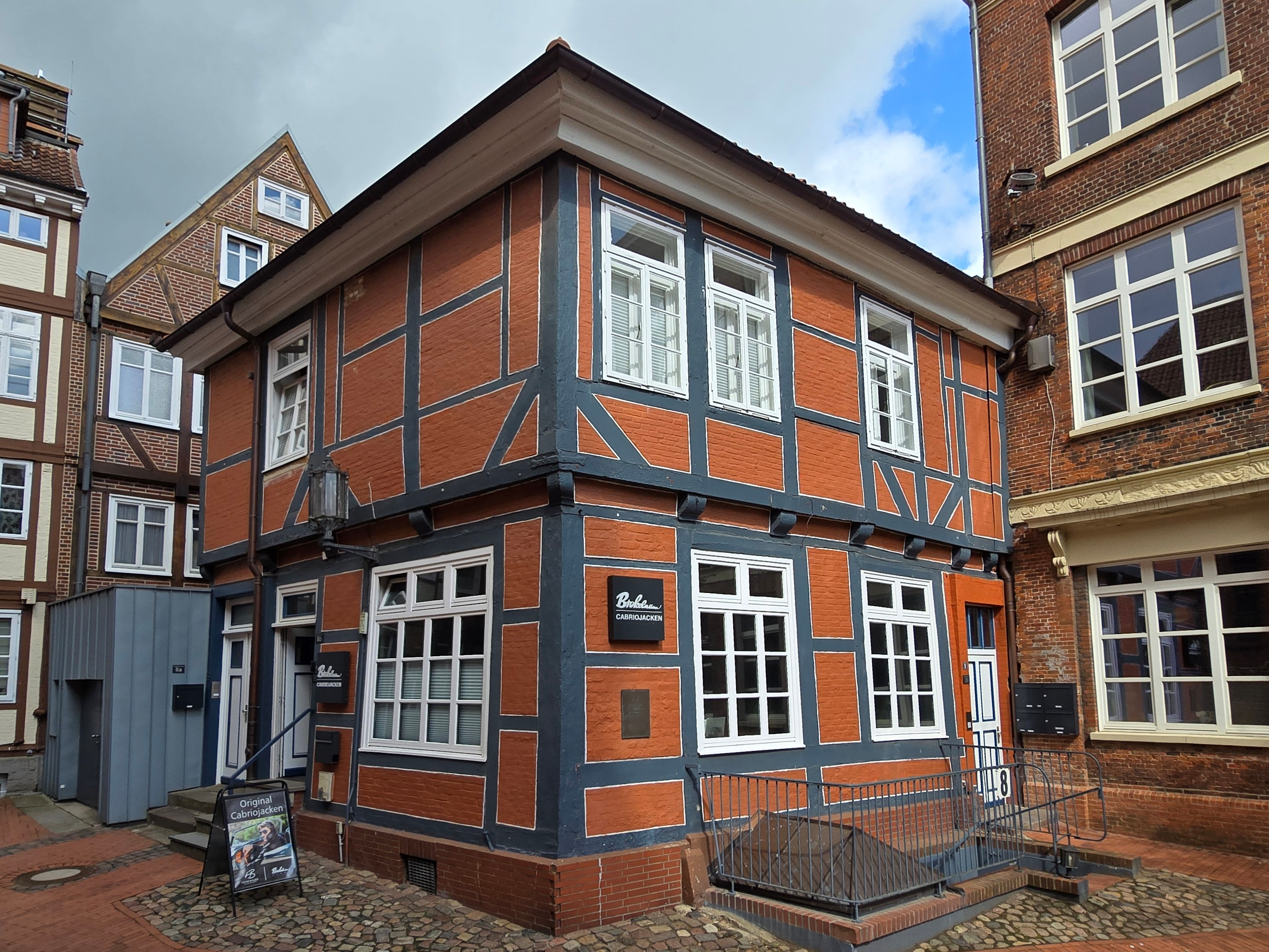
Former synagogue of Stade

In 1849 Stade's synagogue opened, but had to close in 1908 due to financial restrictions. A teacher for Jewish religion and Hebrew was employed (after 1890 Stade's community could not afford a teacher any more). From 1903 on the Jewish community of Stade was granted public subsidies to continue functioning. The Stade Region remained a Jewish diaspora, and from 1860 on Stade's land-rabbinate was never staffed again, but served alternately by one of the other three Hanoverian land-rabbinates. Labour migration and emigration to urban centres outside the Stade Region and Jewish demography led to a reduction of the number of Jews in the Stade Region (786 in 1913, 716 in 1928). However, most of the remaining Jews were deported during the Nazi regime.

During World War II, a Nazi court jail operated in Stade. During the war, Stade remained completely untouched by Allied bombings.

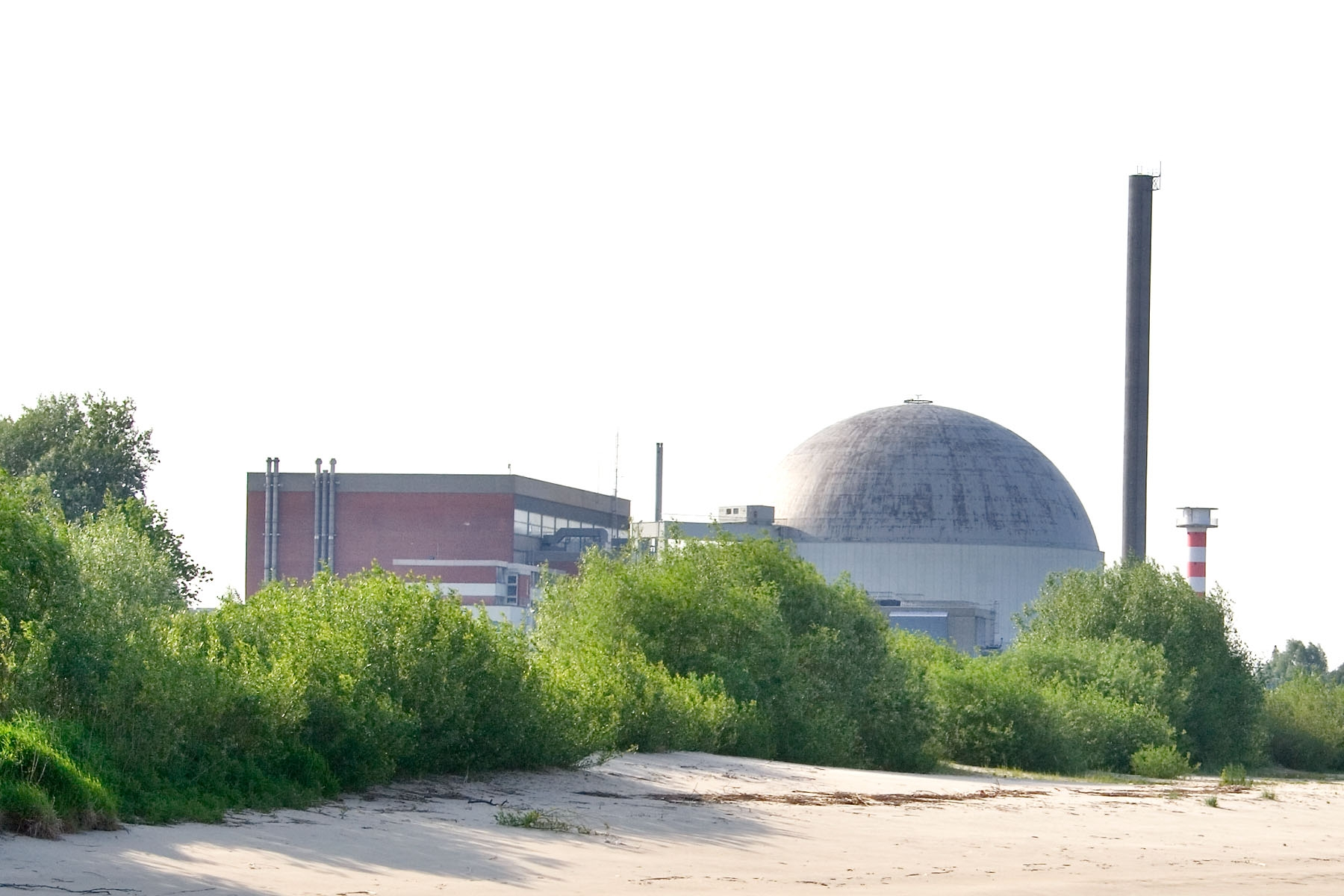
Stade nuclear power plant (offline) in 2006

In recent decades, Stade's economy has benefited significantly from the presence of chemical and aerospace industry at the Elbe river, most notably Dow Chemical and Airbus. Also by the Elbe at Stade is the decommissioned Stade Nuclear Power Plant, which was connected to the power grid from 1972 to 2003. By the time the plant was brought offline, it was Germany's second oldest reactor. Following Germany's 2002 decision to phase out nuclear power generation, Stade was the first German plant to be affected; it was closed down permanently on 14 November 2003. Close to the former nuclear plant there is an inactive oil-fired power station, the Schilling Power Station.

In 2026, a mass shooting occurred at a youth welfare centre in Stade; 6 people were killed.

== Sights ==
The Old Town of Stade is home to a variety of notable historic buildings; among the most notable are the St. Cosmae et Damiani Lutheran Church, the Wilhadi Lutheran Church, the city hall, the Schwedenspeicher and the Zeughaus.

Located near to Stade are the gigantic pylons of Elbe Crossing 1 and Elbe Crossing 2; the Elbe Crossing 2 pylons are the tallest in Europe and the sixth-tallest in the world.

== Transport ==
In late 2007, line S3 of the S-Bahn Hamburg was extended to Stade. Trains depart Stade station every 20 minutes (at peak times), arriving at Hamburg central station in roughly one hour.

== Local industry ==
Firms with notable locations in the area include:

- Dow Chemical, chemicals
- Airbus Deutschland GmbH, aerospace
- E.ON, power plant
- Air Liquide, industrial gases
- Air Products & Chemicals, industrial gases
- Aluminium Oxid Stade GmbH, aluminium oxide refinery
- Stähler Agrochemie, fertilizer and biocides
- PROKON Nord Energiesysteme GmbH, wind turbines and biofuel
- Lindemann (Bauunternehmen), construction

== Twin towns – sister cities ==
Stade is twinned with:

- Giv'at Shmuel, Israel
- Gołdap, Poland
- Karlshamn, Sweden

== Notable people ==
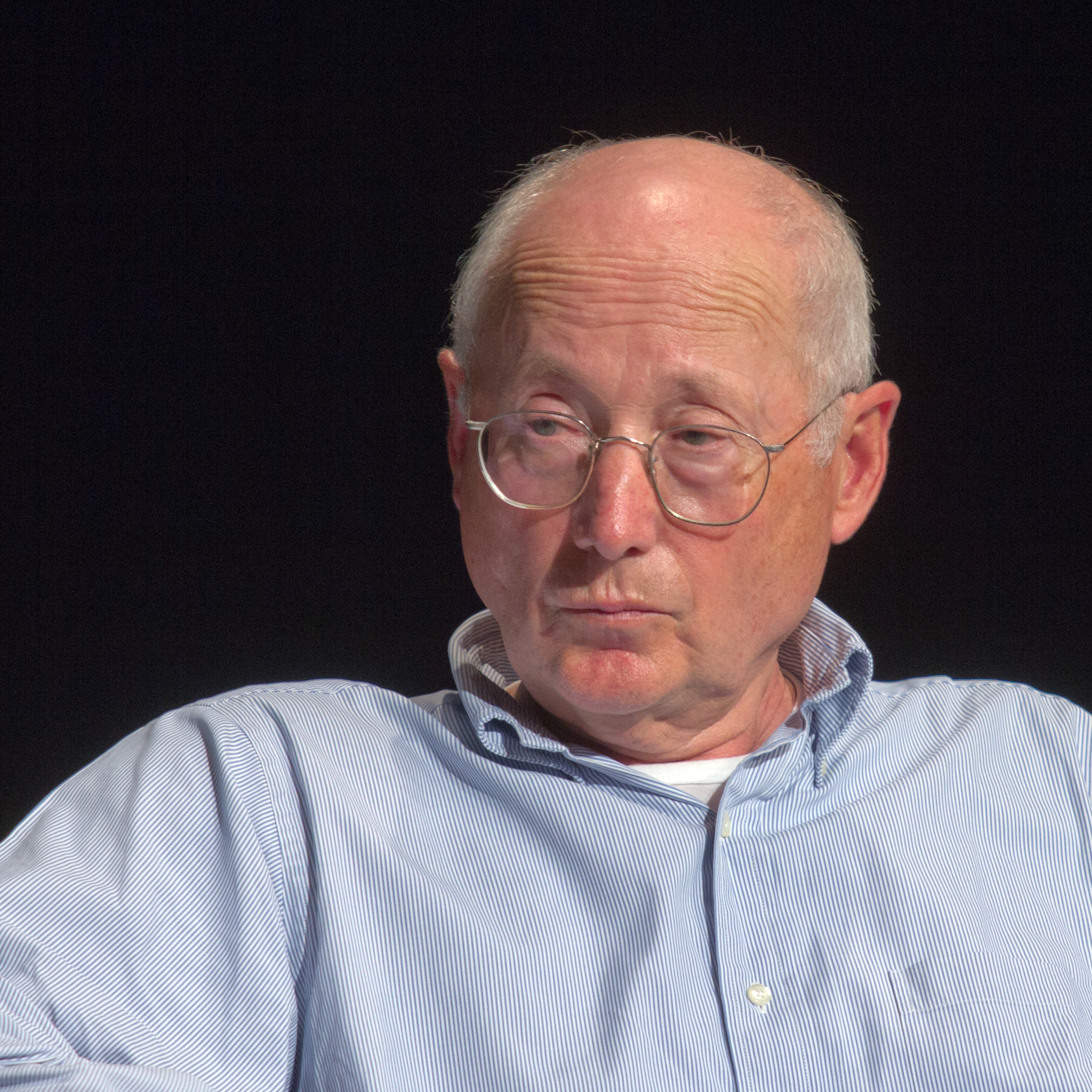
Stefan Aust, 2014

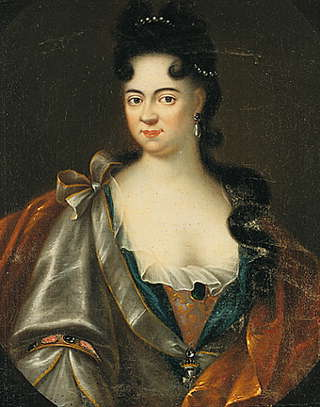
Maria Aurora von Königsmarck, pre-1728

- Peter von Sivers (1674–1740), Russian naval officer
- August Karl von Goeben (1816–1880), Prussian general.
- Max von Bahrfeldt (1856–1936), Prussian general of the infantry, stationed at Stade.
- Ernst Hans Ludwig Krause (1859–1942), physician, botanist and mycologist
- Jost Fitschen (1869–1947), botanist known for his work in the field of dendrology
- Ernst-Eberhard Hell (1887–1973), general in Wehrmacht during World War II
- Eberhard von Koerber (1938–2017), manager and on the Board of BMW
- Stefan Aust (born 1946), journalist, chief editor of Der Spiegel in 1994–2008
- Carsten Eggers (born 1957), sculptor and painter
- Angela Denoke (born 1961), opera singer
- Stefan Konarske (born 1980), actor
- Juliette Schoppmann (born 1980), singer

=== Aristocracy ===
- Henrik Horn (1618–1693), a Swedish nobleman (freiherr), admiral and member of the Privy Council of Sweden
- Maria Aurora von Königsmarck (1662–1728), countess, mistress of Augustus the Strong.
- Amalia von Königsmarck (1663–1740), Swedish noble, dilettante painter, actor and poet
- Philip Christoph von Königsmarck (1665–1694), a Swedish count and soldier.
- Ulrich de Maizière (1912–2006), general, created the "Innere Führung" in the Bundeswehr

=== Sport ===
- Dirk Dammann (born 1967), footballer, played 260 games
- Andrasch Starke (born 1974), jockey, 9 x German flat racing Champion Jockey champion
- Tabea Kemme (born 1991), footballer who has played 154 and 47 games for Germany women
- Marnon Busch (born 1994), footballer, played over 260 games

== Gallery ==
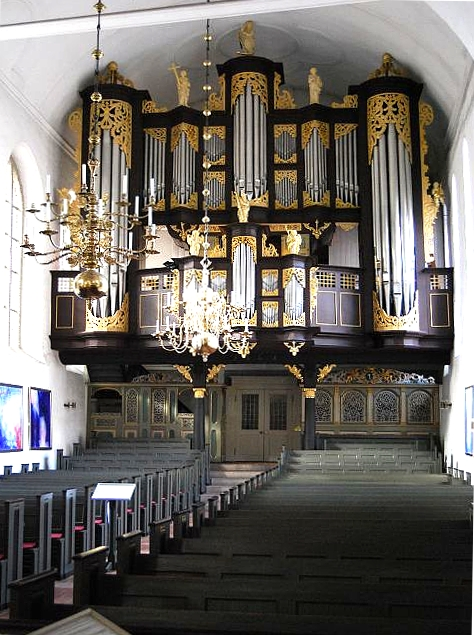
Schnitger organ at St. Cosmae

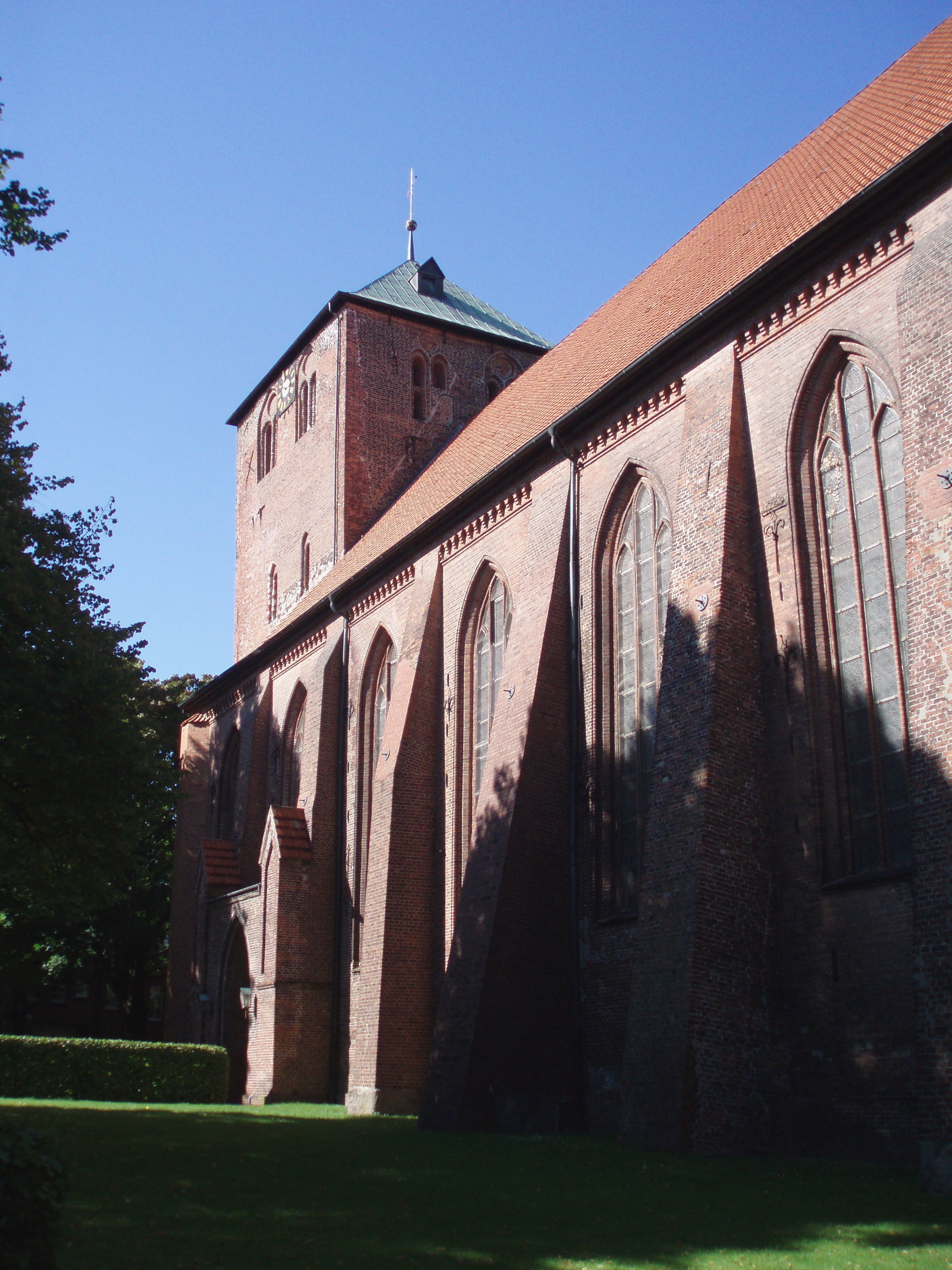
St. Wilhadi

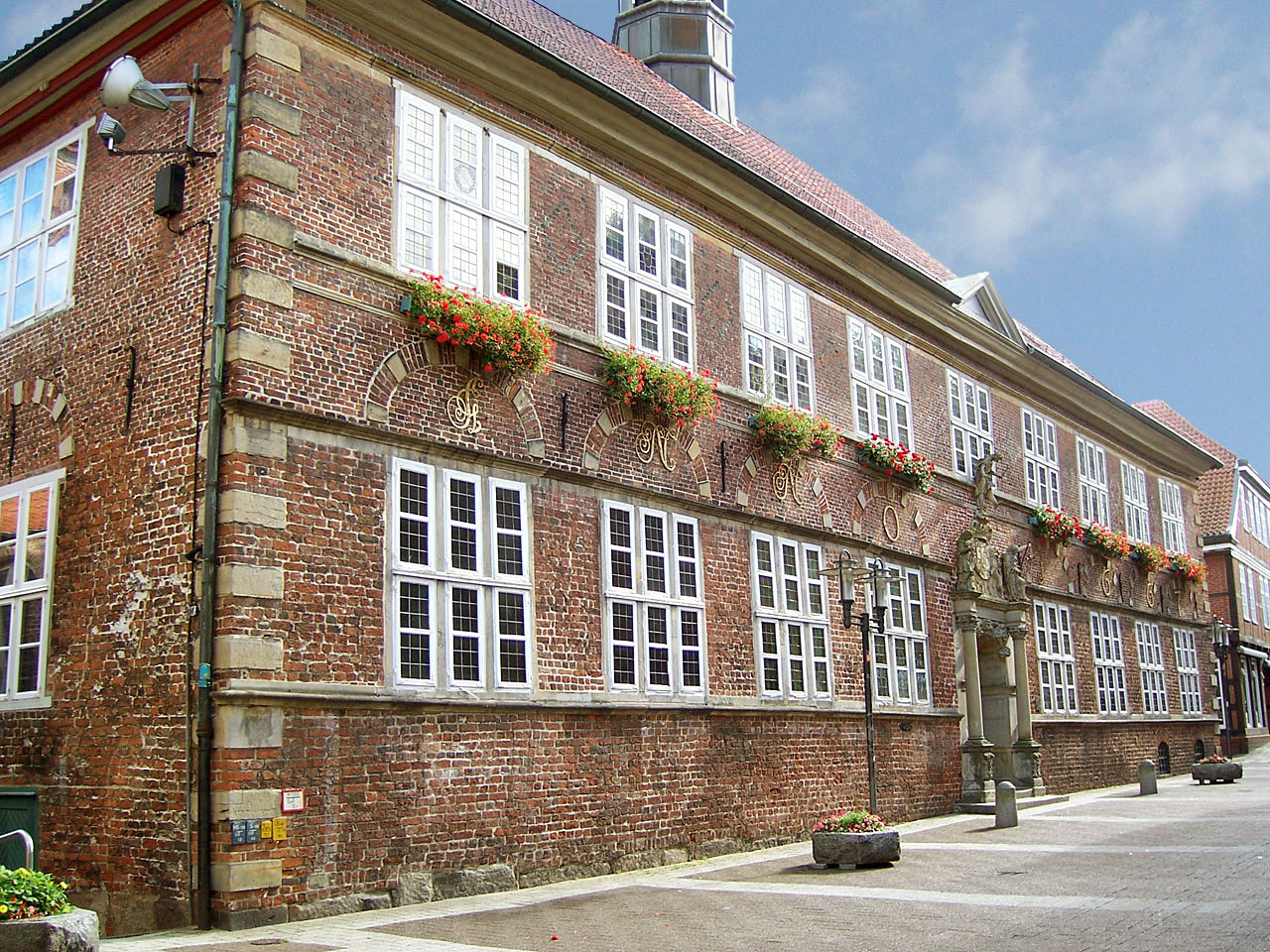
Old town hall

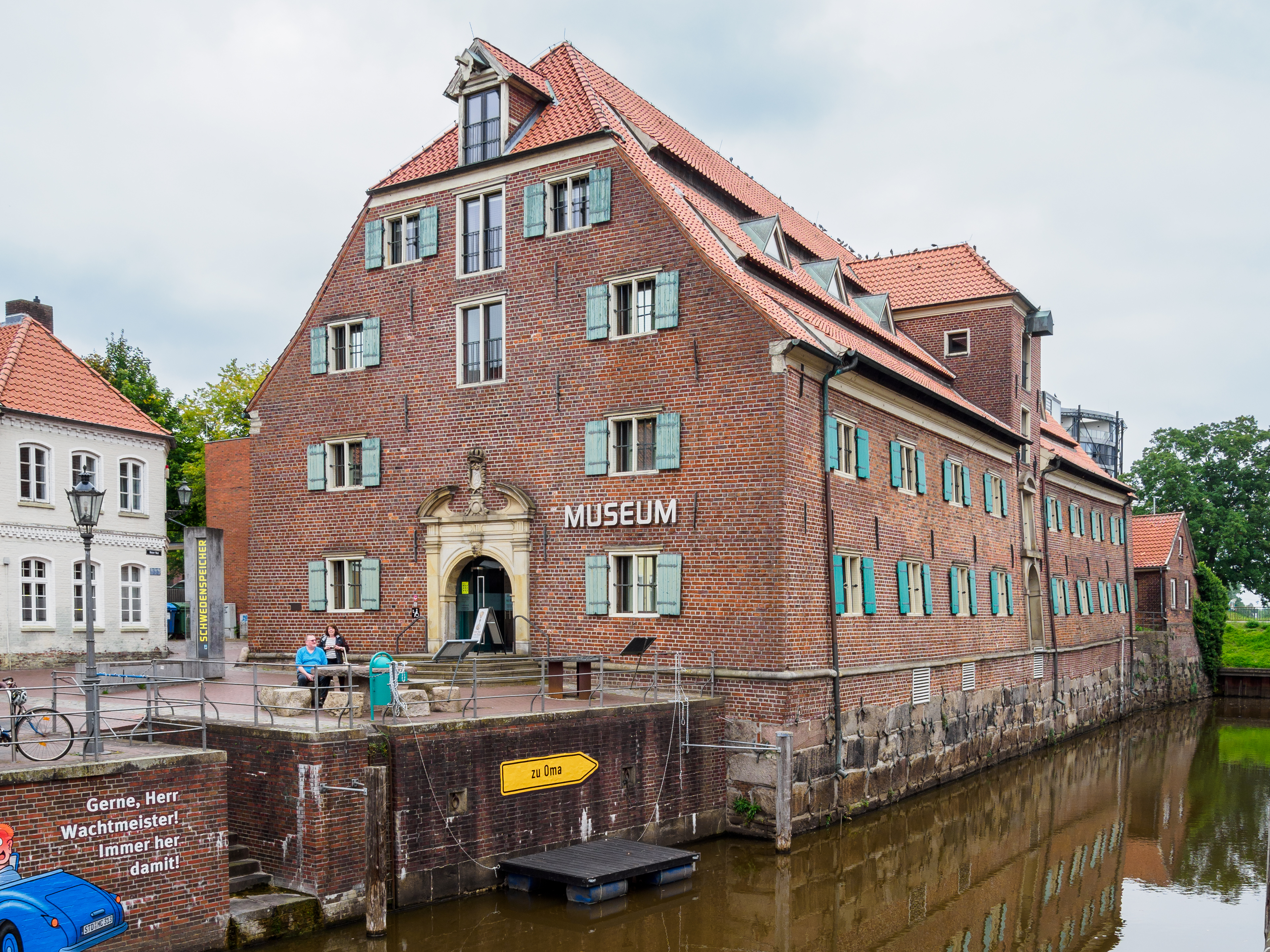
Schwedenspeicher (Swedish warehouse)

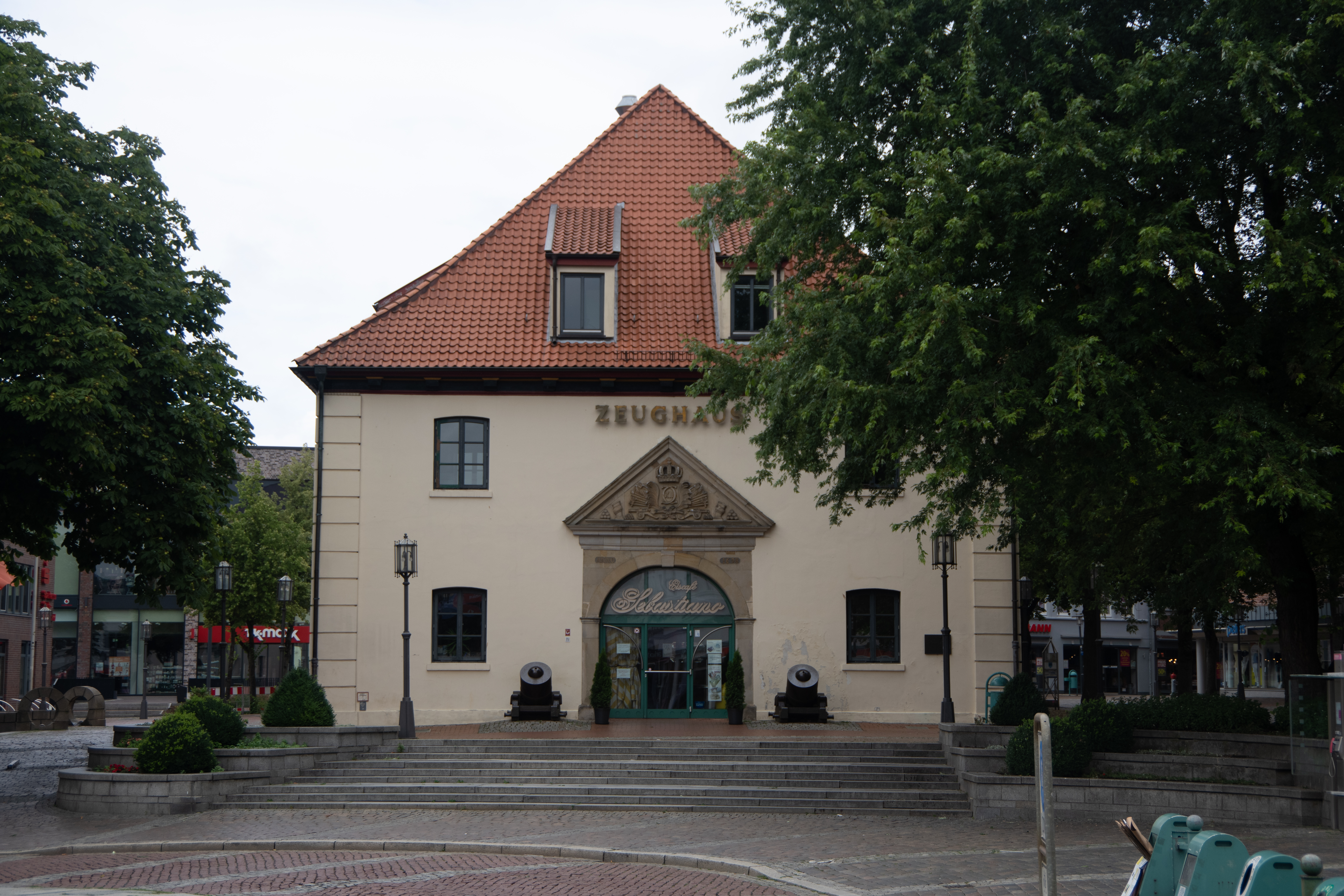
Zeughaus (Swedish armoury)

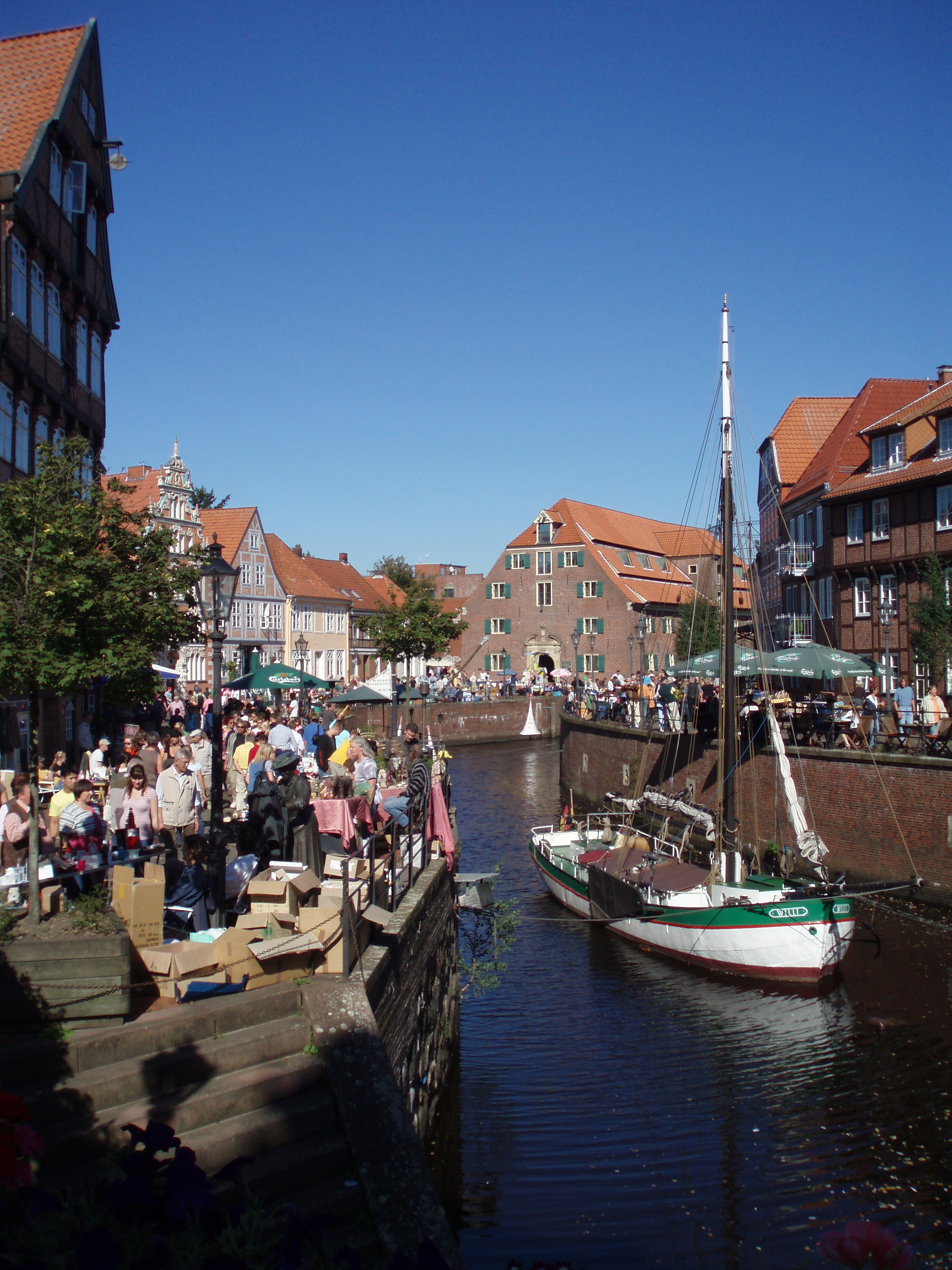
Old Hanse harbor

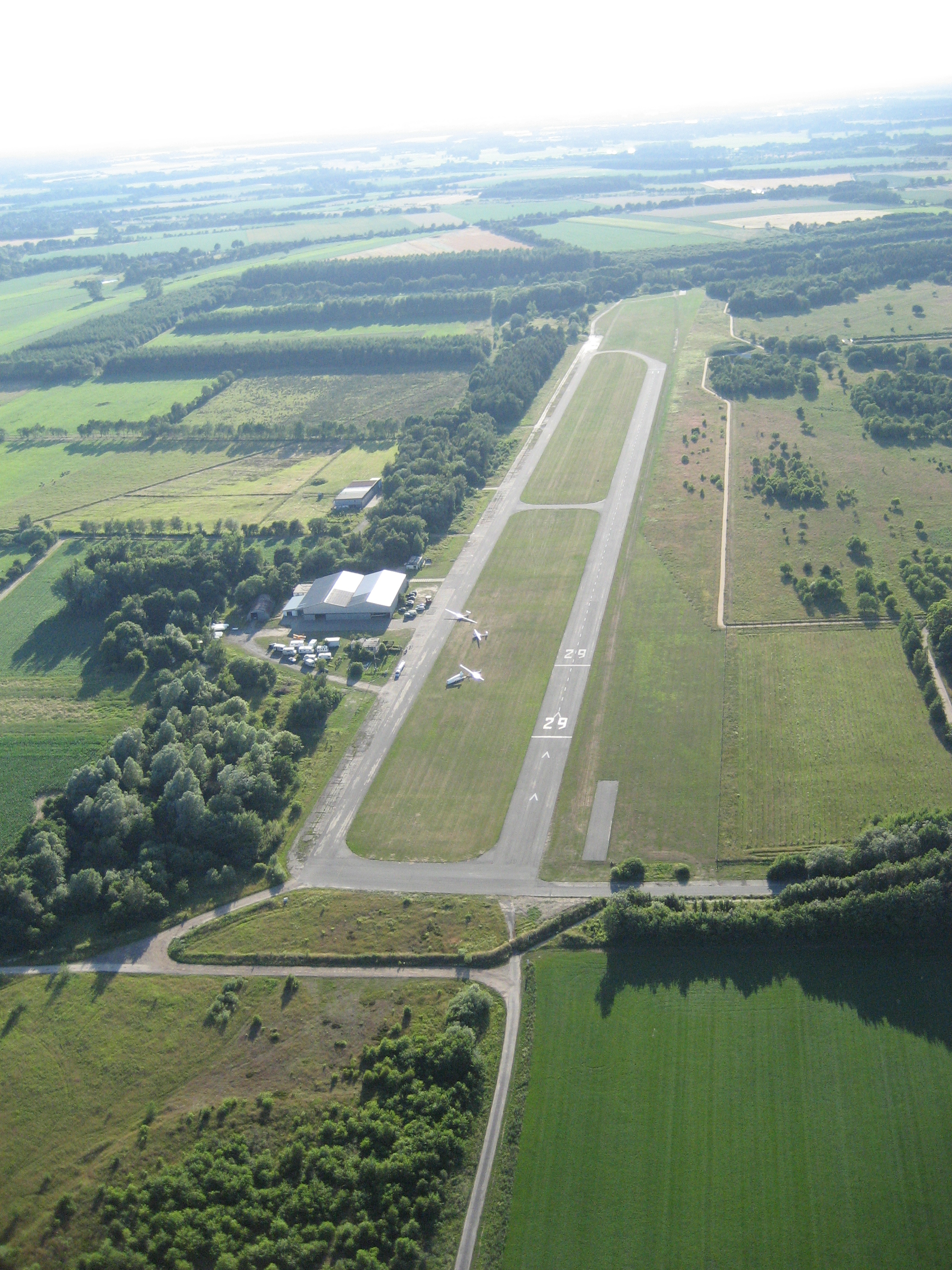
Stade airfield (EDHS)

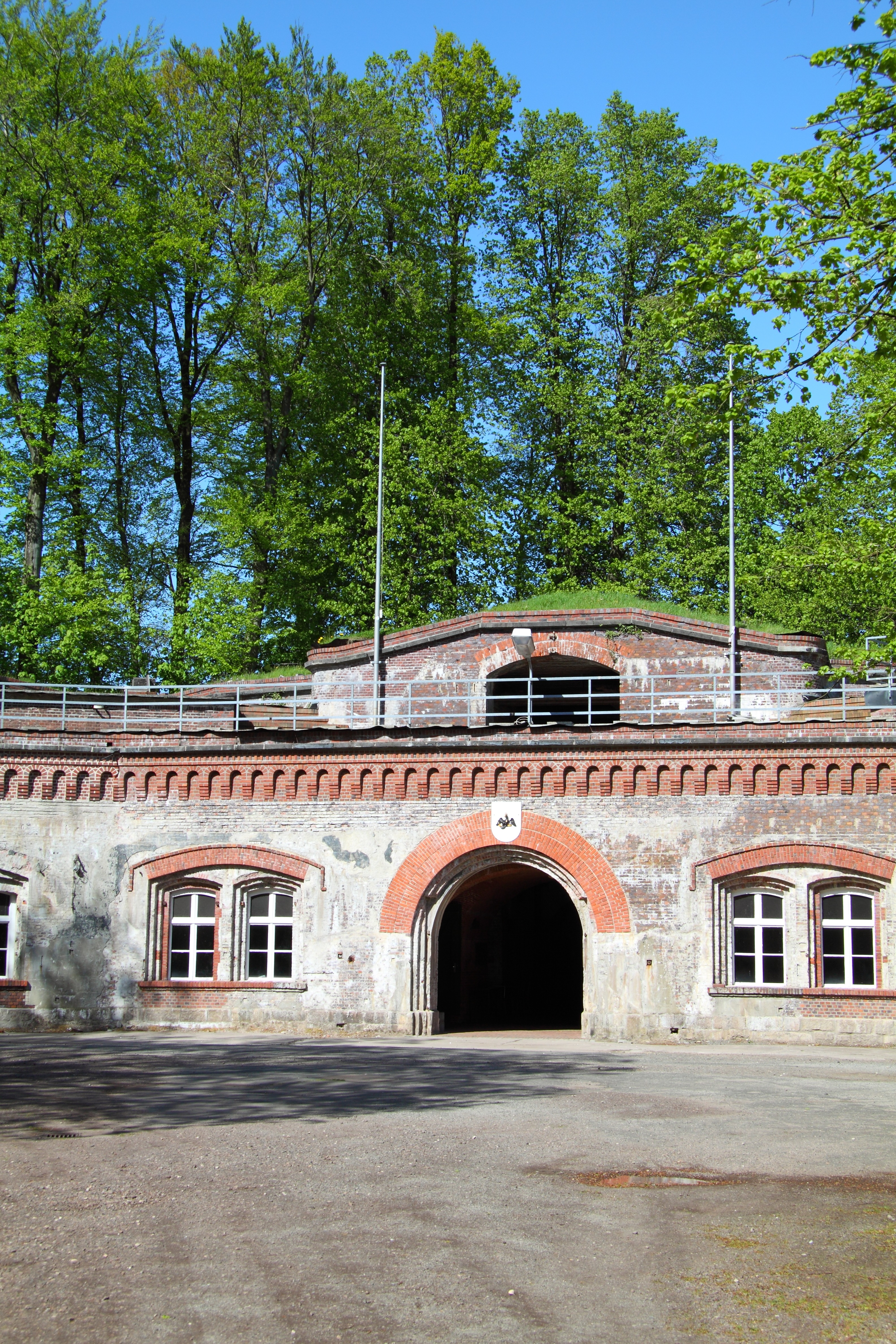
19th-century Grauerort fortress

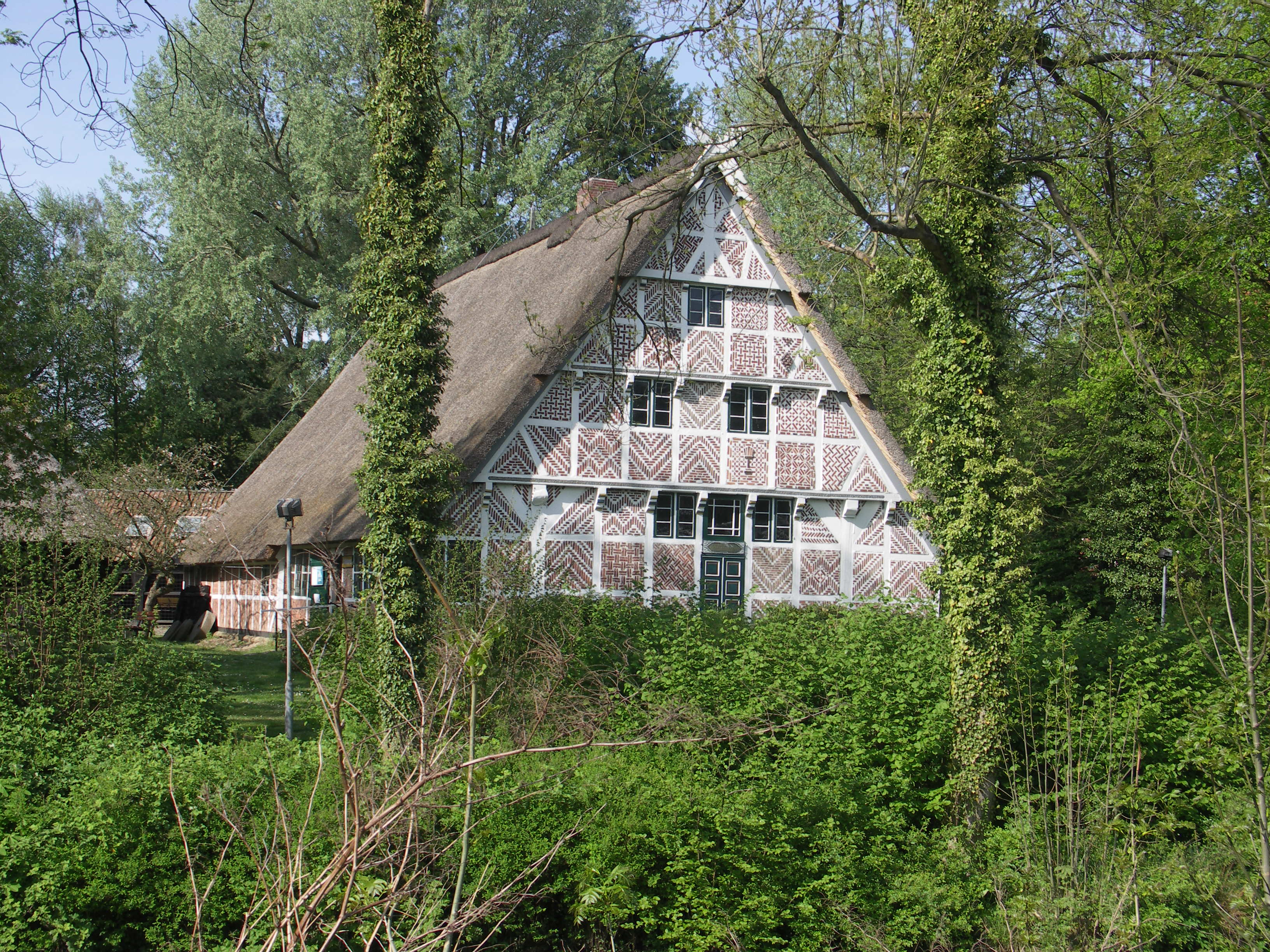
House at Insel museum

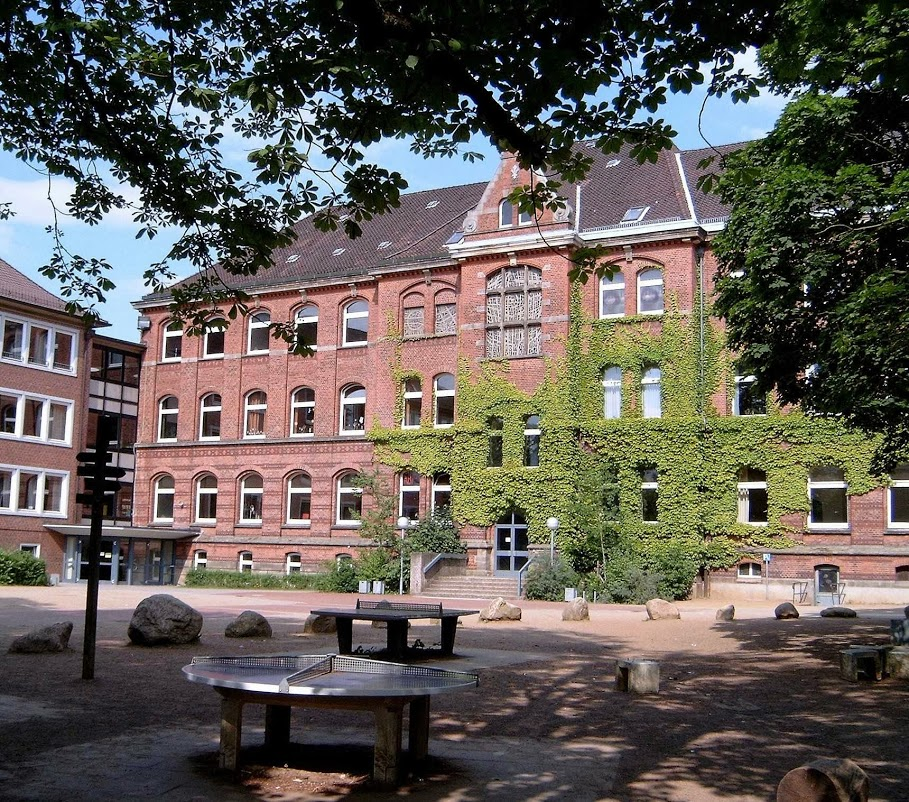
Gymnasium Athenaeum Stade

== See also ==
- Horstsee
