= Ernst von Steinberg =

Hanoverian minister

Ernst von Steinberg (26 September 1692 – 3 October 1759) was a Hanoverian minister and head of the German Chancery in London from 1737 until 1748.

== Life and career ==
He was the son of Georg von Steinberg and Eva von Korff. He married Marie Luise von Wendt in 1726 and replaced Johann Philipp von Hattorf as German Chancery head upon his death in 1737. He gained his position due to the influence of his cousin, Amalie von Wallmoden, the future Countess of Yarmouth, who was the mistress of George II. George II was also Elector of Hanover, hence the need for a representative of Hanover in London.

He was politically conservative and rarely expressed his opinion to King George, acting instead as primarily a secretary. He did, however, participate in court life and was the first Hanoverian minister to be active in the British court. His successor, Philipp Adolph von Münchhausen, would follow in his footsteps.

Steinberg resigned his post in 1748 and returned to Hanover. He and his wife had a son, George August (born 18 May 1739), and a daughter, Eva.

== Sources ==
- Jeremy Black, George II: Puppet of the Politicians? (Exeter: UP, 2007), p. 162.

Political offices
Preceded by Johann Philipp von Hattorf	Head of the German Chancery in London; 1737–1748	Succeeded by Philipp Adolph von Münchhausen
