= Mary von Bothmer =

English-German writer and aristocrat (1833-1901)

Mary von Bothmer (1833–1901; also known as the Countess von Bothmer) was an English-German writer and aristocrat. She published six books during her lifetime, including German Home Life (1876).

Mary von Bothmer was born in London in 1833. Her father was John Young, a British merchant. In 1856, she married German diplomat Major Count Hippolyt von Bothmer (1812-1891), with whom she had two children, Alfred and Mabel. She died in 1901.

== Written works ==
=== German Home Life ===
Likely Von Bothmer's most popular work, German Home Life was a collection of essays on German domestic culture originally published in Fraser's Magazine. At least three edition of German Home Life were published between 1876 and 1877. A Daily News review of the book called it" the work of a lady whose extreme frankness and satirical humour amuse the reader greatly."

=== Novels ===
- Strong Hands and Steadfast Hearts (1870)
- A Poet Hero (1870)
- Cruel as the Grave (1871)
- Aut Caesar aut Nihil (1883)

=== Nonfiction ===
- German Home Life (1876)
- The Sovereign Ladies of Europe (1899)
