= German Chancery =

Official office name for the Hanoverian ministry

The German Chancery (German: Deutsche Kanzlei), also known as the Hanoverian Chancery, was the official name given to the office of the Hanoverian ministry in London during the years of personal union between Great Britain (later the United Kingdom of Great Britain and Ireland) and the Electorate of Hanover (later the Kingdom of Hanover) from 1714 until 1837. The office ceased upon the accession of Queen Victoria in the United Kingdom and King Ernest Augustus in Hanover in 1837.

== Functions and duties ==
The primary duty of the Hanoverian minister in London was to transmit memoranda between the Privy Council of Hanover and the Elector of Hanover, who was the king of Great Britain. During the reigns of George I, George II, and most of the active reign of George III, the ministers held few other duties, working in two small rooms within St James's Palace. Politically, the ministers held little power in Hanover or in Great Britain throughout the eighteenth century.

Unlike the many ministers in Hanover, however, the minister in London was required to have an in-depth knowledge of the British political system and the current opinions of the two major political parties – namely the Tory and Whig factions – and most importantly, he had constant and direct access to the Elector. As the position matured, namely during the French Revolutionary Wars, it became more politically responsible, especially under the administration of Ernst zu Münster, who worked tirelessly to make the Hanoverian cause known to the British people. He was rewarded with the expansion of Hanover's borders and the elevation of the electorate to a kingdom during the Congress of Vienna in 1814. While the final minister achieved little recognition in comparison, the post had become all but defunct by the 1830s as the union between the crowns was reaching its inevitable end. The last minister returned to Hanover in 1837 with Ernest Augustus, the new Hanoverian king, and the post was thereafter unnecessary. The records of the chancery are now located in the state archives of Hanover.

== Hanoverian Envoys in London ==
Following the Glorious Revolution in 1688, and up to the Hanoverian succession, a Hanoverian minister was resident in London as an emissary to English court for the rights and claims of Sophia, Electress of Hanover to the English succession. The position survived until the death of Bothmer, the last minister to serve in this capacity, in 1732, although most of the functions of the office had been assumed by the Chancery. The known Hanoverian envoys are:

- Ludwig Justus Sinold von Schütz (1689–1713)
- Thomas Grote, Baron von Grote (1713)
- Georg Wilhelm Sinold von Schütz (1713–1714)
- C. F. Kreyenberg (1714)
- Hans Caspar von Bothmer (1714–1732)

== Heads of the German Chancery in London ==
The records for the ministers now reside in Hanover so there is some uncertainty about the succession of the heads of the German Chancery. It is certain that after the retirement of Bernstorff in 1720, there were multiple heads of the Chancery. This practice ended after Bothmer's death in 1732. The probable succession of ministers in London is as follows:

Minister	Term
Andreas Gottlieb von Bernstorff	1714–1720
Hans Caspar von Bothmer	1720–1730
Christian Ulrich von Hardenberg	1725–1727
Johann Philipp von Hattorf	1728–1737
Ernst von Steinberg	1737–1748
Philipp Adolph von Münchhausen	1748–1762
Burckhard Heinrich von Behr	1762–1771
Johann Friedrich Carl von Alvensleben	1771–1795
Georg August von Steinberg	1795
Ernst Ludwig Julius von Lenthe	1795–1805
Ernst Friedrich Herbert zu Münster	1805–1831
Ludwig Conrad Georg von Ompteda	1831–1837
