= Ernst zu Münster =

German politician and diplomat (1766–1839)

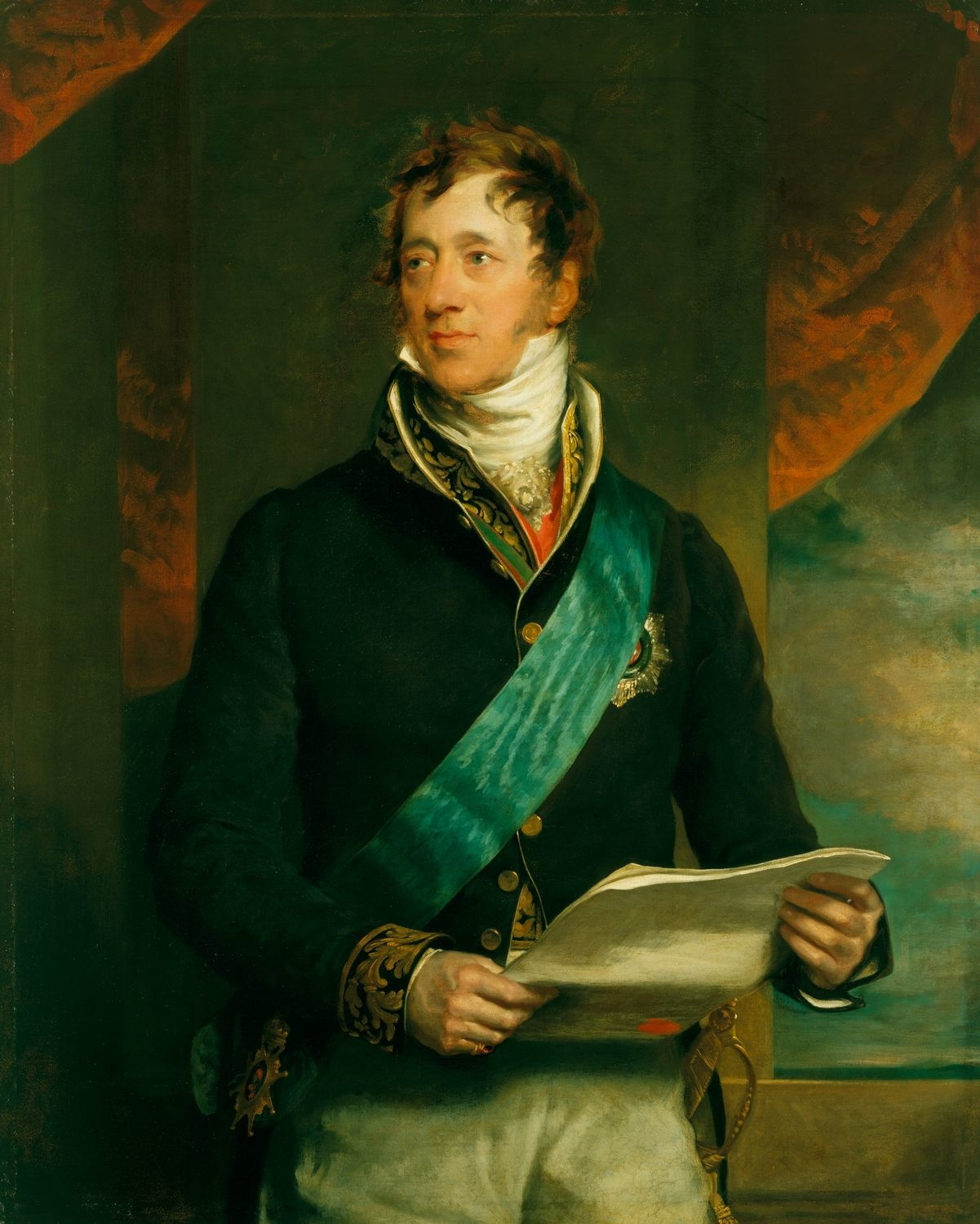
Portrait of Count Münster by Thomas Lawrence, 1815

Graf Ernst Friedrich Herbert zu Münster (1 March 1766 – 20 May 1839) was a German politician and diplomat who served under the House of Hanover. His title was given as "The Count Munster" in the official British Government translations from the French of the treaties he signed at the Congress of Vienna (see for example Treaty between Prussia and Hanover, 29 May 1815).

== Biography ==
Ernst zu Münster was born the son of Georg von Münster zu Surenburg (1721–1773), Hofmarschall of the Prince-Bishopric of Osnabrück, and his second wife Eleonore. Count Münster studied at Göttingen University together with the three youngest sons of King George III. He entered the public service in the Electorate of Hanover. One of his first tasks was to bring Prince Augustus Frederick, Duke of Sussex and his company home from Italy. Later he was appointed minister for the affairs of Hanover in London (the German Chancery) in 1805 following Ernst Ludwig von Lenthe.

Hanover was occupied from 1803 by French forces and much of its army went abroad to serve as part of the King's German Legion. In November 1813 Hanover was liberated following the Battle of Leipzig and Münster was appointed chief minister. At the Congress of Vienna (1815) he had to care for the German assets of the House of Hanover which he successfully did. The electorate became the Kingdom of Hanover and gained territories at the North Sea, partially ruled earlier in personal union, such as the Duchies of Bremen-Verden and partially ruled by others, to wit East Frisia. However, the bulk of another duchy ruled before the Napoleonic Wars in personal union, Saxe-Lauenburg north of the river Elbe was assigned in personal union to Denmark. He stayed in office until 1831.

== Family ==
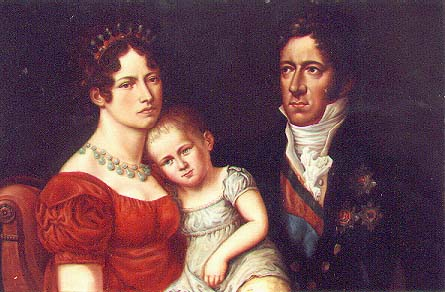
Ernst zu Münster, with his family.

Münster was married to Countess Wilhelmine Charlotte of Lippe-Alverdissen (1783–1858), daughter of Philip II, Count of Schaumburg-Lippe and sister of George William, Prince of Schaumburg-Lippe; he was survived by his wife and son (later Prince) Georg Herbert Münster when he died in 1839.

Political offices
Preceded by Ernst Ludwig Julius von Lenthe	Head of the German Chancery in London; 1805 – 1831	Succeeded by Ludwig Conrad Georg von Ompteda
