= Andreas Gottlieb von Bernstorff =

German statesman

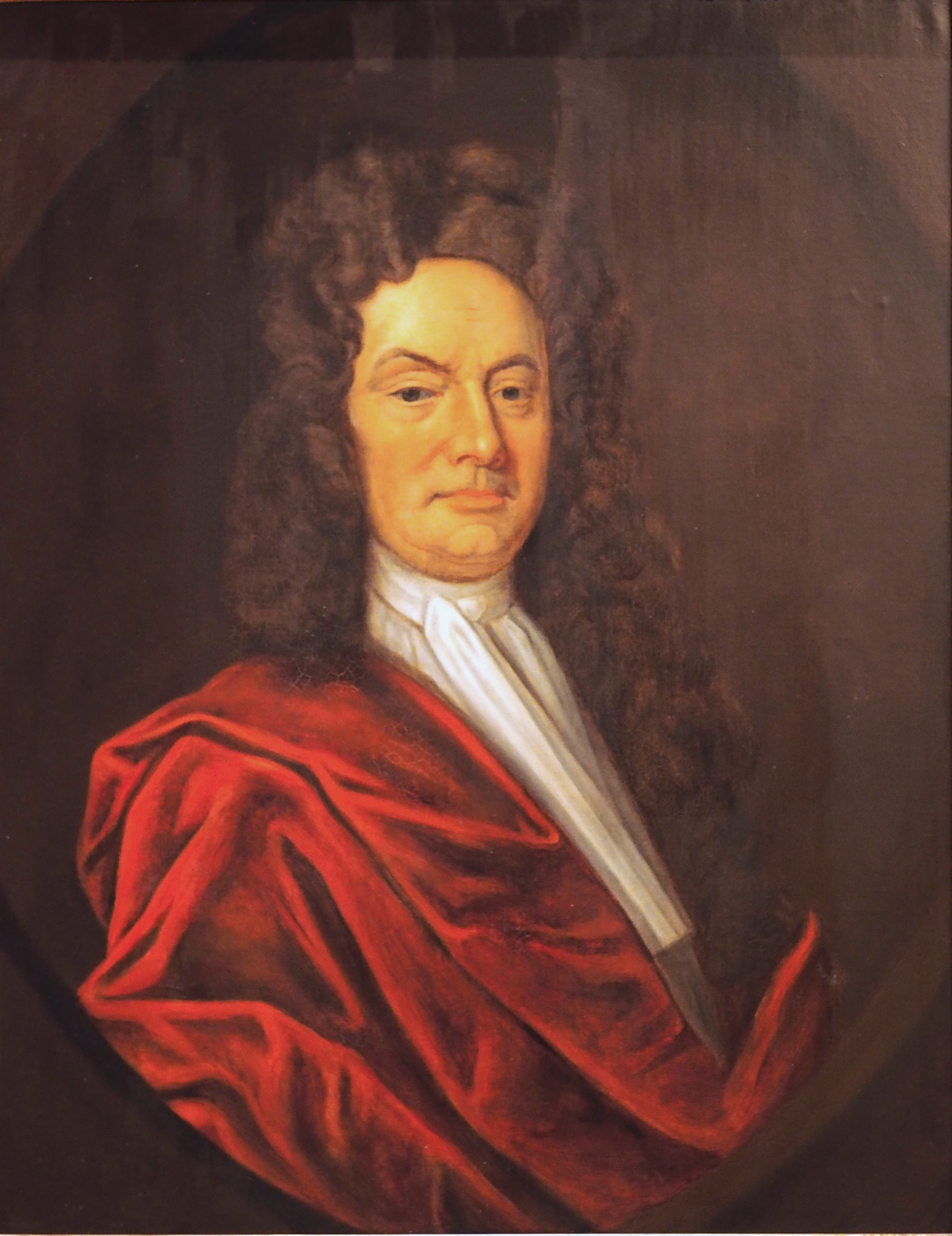
Andreas Gottlieb von Bernstorff

Andreas Gottlieb Freiherr von Bernstorff (2 March 1649 – 6 July 1726) was a German statesman and a member of the Bernstorff noble family of Mecklenburg. He became prime minister of the Electorate of Hanover in 1709. His term ended in 1714, after which he served as the head of the German Chancery in London until 1723.

Political offices
New title	Head of the German Chancery in London; 1714 – 1723	Succeeded by Johann Philipp von Hattorf
