= Schloss Bothmer =

- Klütz, Mecklenburg-Vorpommern
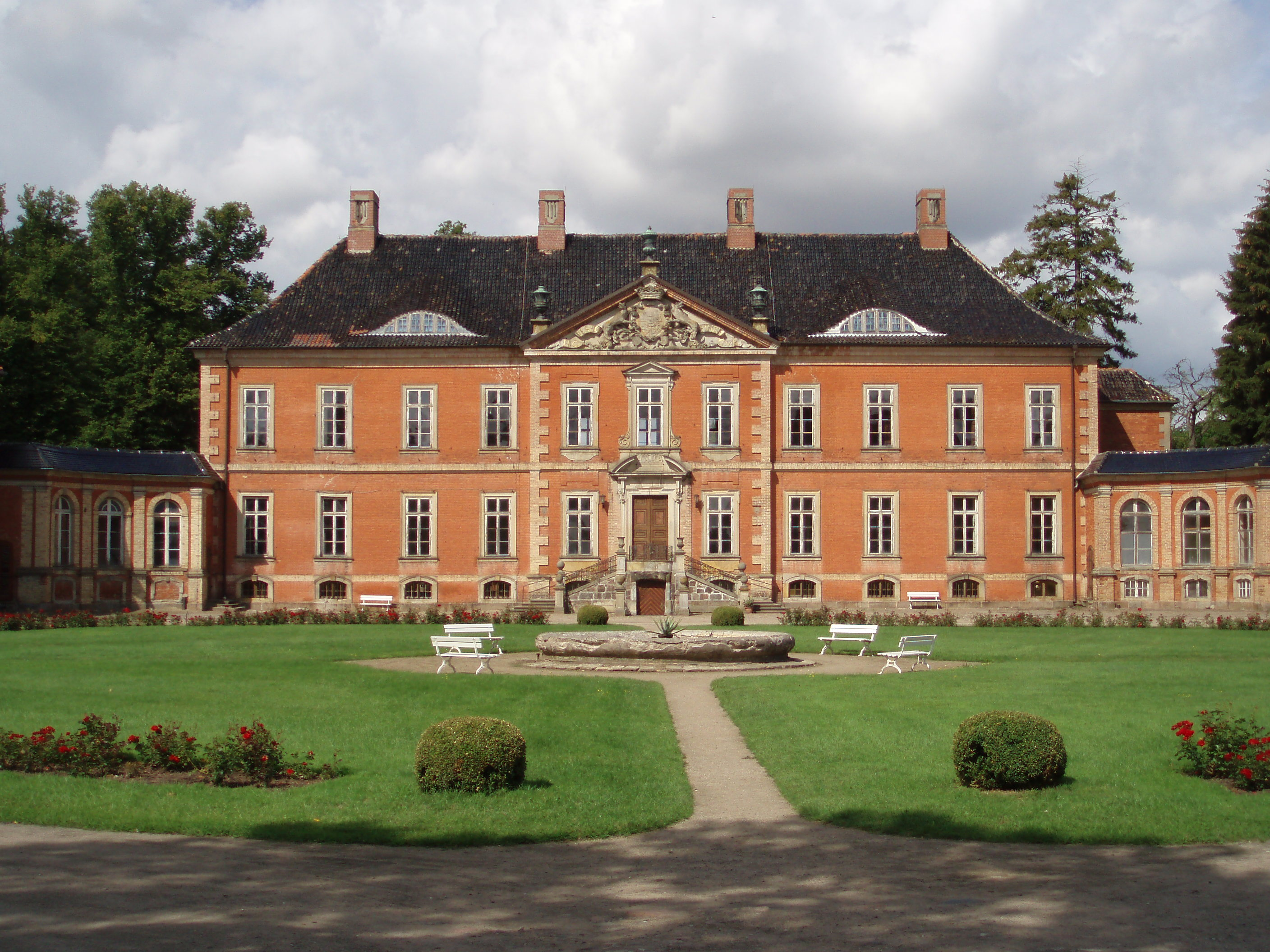
- Schloss Bothmer, main building façade

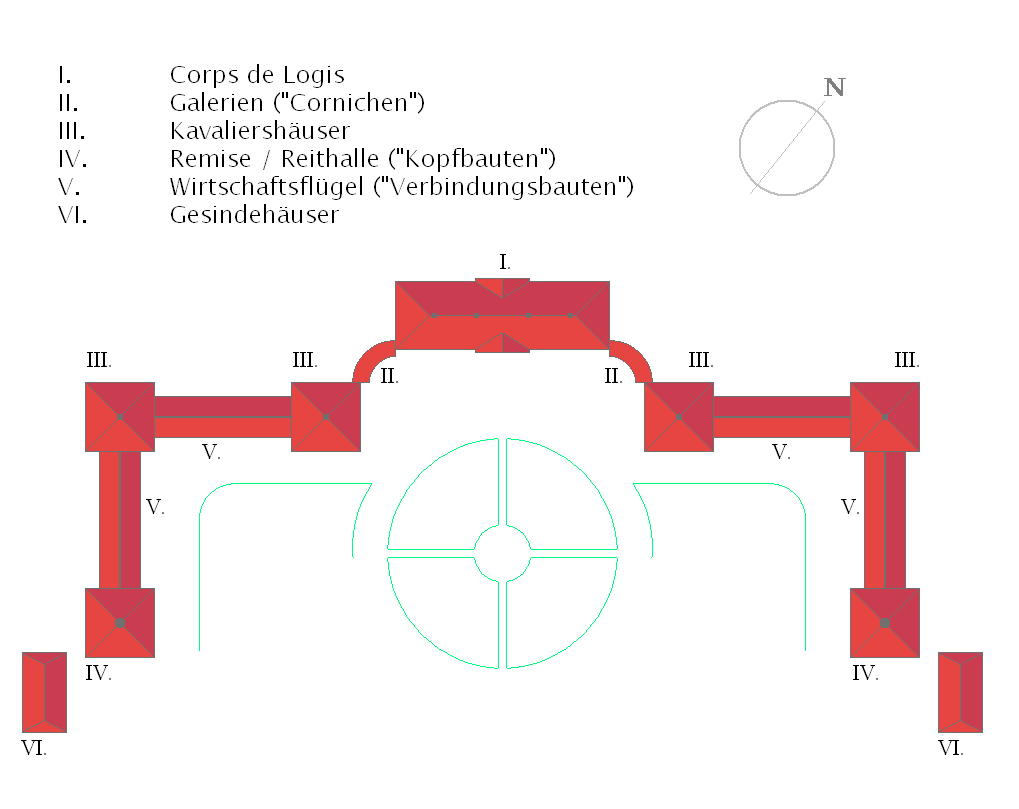
- Plan of the main buildings

Site information
- Type: Schloss
- Open to the public: Yes

Location
- Location in Germany Schloss Bothmer (Germany)
- Coordinates: 53°57′34″N 11°09′33″E

Site history
- Built: 1726–32
- Built by: Count Hans Caspar von Bothmer

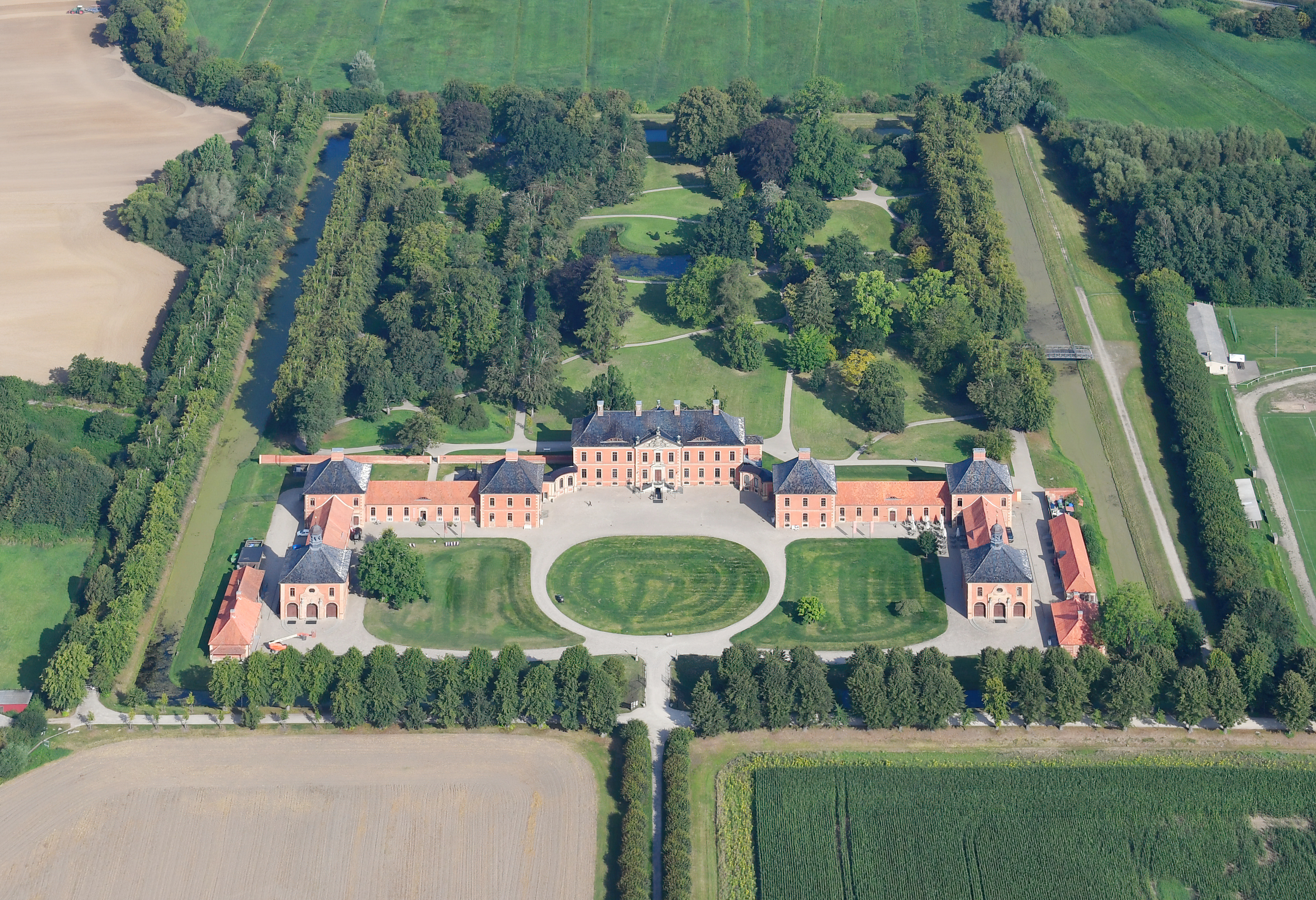
Aerial view of Schloss Bothmer and its gardens

Schloss Bothmer is a Baroque palatial manor house ensemble in northern Germany. It was built for Count Hans Caspar von Bothmer to designs by architect Johann Friedrich Künnecke in 1726–32. It remained the property of the Bothmer family until 1945. It is today owned by the State of Mecklenburg-Vorpommern and, following a renovation in 2009–15, open to the public. It is the largest Baroque-era country house ensemble in Mecklenburg-Vorpommern.

== History ==
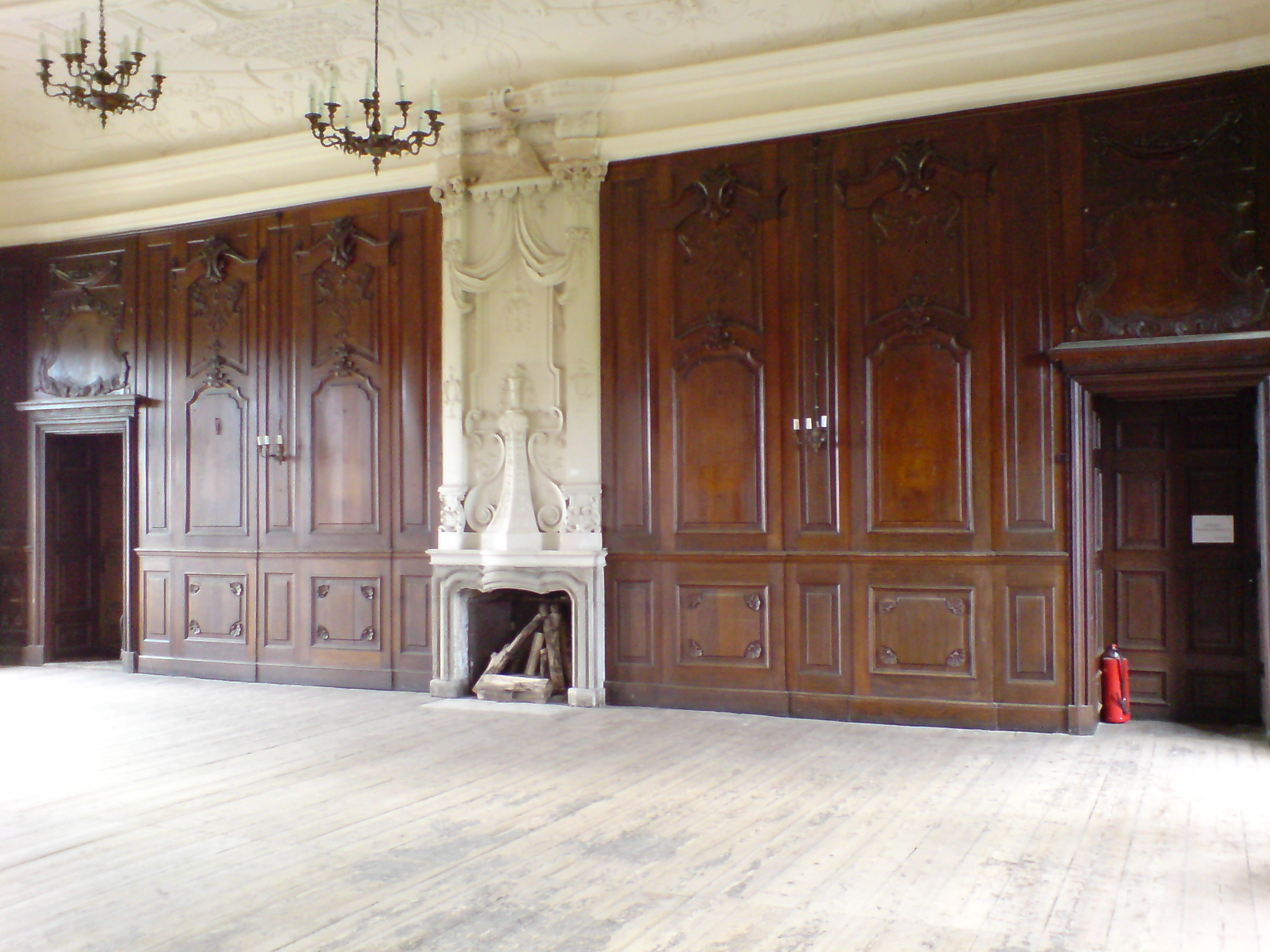
Interior prior to the renovation

Schloss Bothmer, the manor and the grounds, was the brainchild of Count Hans Caspar von Bothmer. The manorial estate was created by buying land to form an entirely new estate, an undertaking that Bothmer undertook for ten years, between 1721 and 1731. Bothmer was active as a diplomat in service of the Electorate of Hanover and lived for long periods of time abroad, notably in London. Among other things, he played a role in helping his employer secure the British throne as George I of Great Britain. While in London from 1720 until his death in 1732, he lived at 10 Downing Street.

The buildings were designed by architect Johann Friedrich Künnecke, and built between 1726 and 1736. Bothmer never saw the finished product, but seems to have decided already during the middle of the 1720s that it should pass to his nephew Hans Caspar Gottfried von Bothmer (1695–1765) upon his own death. His will further stipulated that it should be inherited as fideikommis, i.e., that the oldest son in each generation should inherit the entire estate (thus avoiding the estate being split up between several heirs). Through the marriage of Hans Caspar Gottfried von Bothmer to Christine Margarete von Bülow (1708–1786), even more land was added to the estate. In 1900 the estate encompassed around 8,000 hectares (20,000 acres) The estate stayed within the family until 1945.

The family fled from the estate during early 1945, in the course of the final stages of World War II. The estate was taken over first by American, then British, and then lastly Soviet troops. After the war, the estate was confiscated by East German authorities and turned into a hospital. Hans Kaspar von Bothmer (1919–1946), nephew of the last owner, had stayed in the castle and worked in the hospital as a nurse until his death. In 1948, the hospital was converted into a retirement home for elderly and remained in that capacity until 1994. During this time, the buildings were substantially altered. Since 2008 the estate has been the property of the State of Mecklenburg-Vorpommern and is run by Staatlichen Schlössern, Parks und Gärten des Landes Mecklenburg-Vorpommern (the Mecklenburg-Vorpommern State Castles, Parks, and Gardens office).

The buildings and park underwent a renovation which began in 2009 and ended with the opening of the main building for visitors in May 2015. The scope and cost of the renovation was substantial:

The restoration cost more than 36 million euros, the bulk of it from EU coffers. The scope of the construction work was enormous: 740 tons of concrete alone were poured into the new foundations, project manager Siefert notes. Six thousand five hundred square meters of facade were renovated, 280 historic windows reconstructed, 1300 square meters of stucco restored and 1,500 square meters of wooden floorboards renewed.

— Grit Büttner: New splendor for an old castle – The Baroque Bothmer Palace complex, Deutsche Welle

During the renovation of the park, two chests containing the former owners' family silver were discovered; the silver was neatly wrapped in newspapers bearing dates in 1943. It was handed over by the authorities to the family.

== Architecture ==
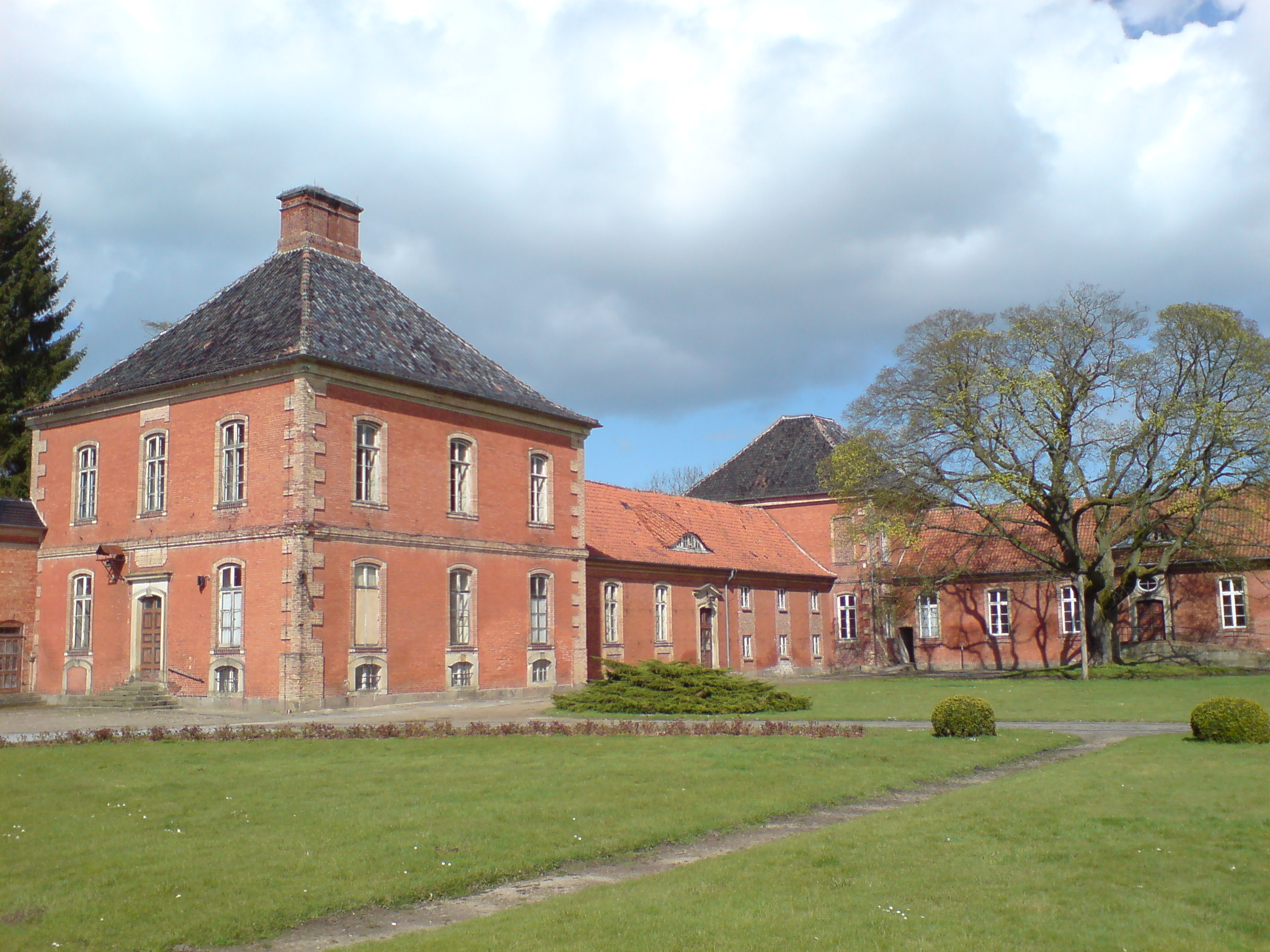
View of pavilions and wings

The architecture of the Baroque country house was inspired by Dutch and English architecture of the time. The Dutch country houses of Het Loo and De Voorst, as well as Buckingham House (predecessor of Buckingham Palace) and The Royal Brass Foundry in England have been mentioned as sources of inspiration. It was not only the overall design which was inspired by foreign examples but also the details: originally, the palace had sash windows, betraying a direct British or Dutch influence.

The ensemble is in many ways a typical example of Baroque architecture and ideals, not least in that it is characterised by symmetry. The main building ensemble consists of a central, main body connected with two-storey wings to three-storey pavilions. The living quarters, the rooms of representations and space used for utilities are thus all contained in a single, large building.

After the renovation of the castle, it today houses a museum which occupies more than 20 rooms, and is focused on the life of Hans Caspar von Bothmer.

The manorial complex also includes the park. The former orangery has been converted into a café for visitors. A curiosity is the 270-metre (890 ft) path known as the Festonallee or "festoon avenue", an avenue of linden trees which have been grown and pruned in order to assume the shape of intertwined festoons. The park has for a long time been used as a venue for open-air concerts.
