= Horstsee =

Lake in Stade, Lower Saxony, Germany

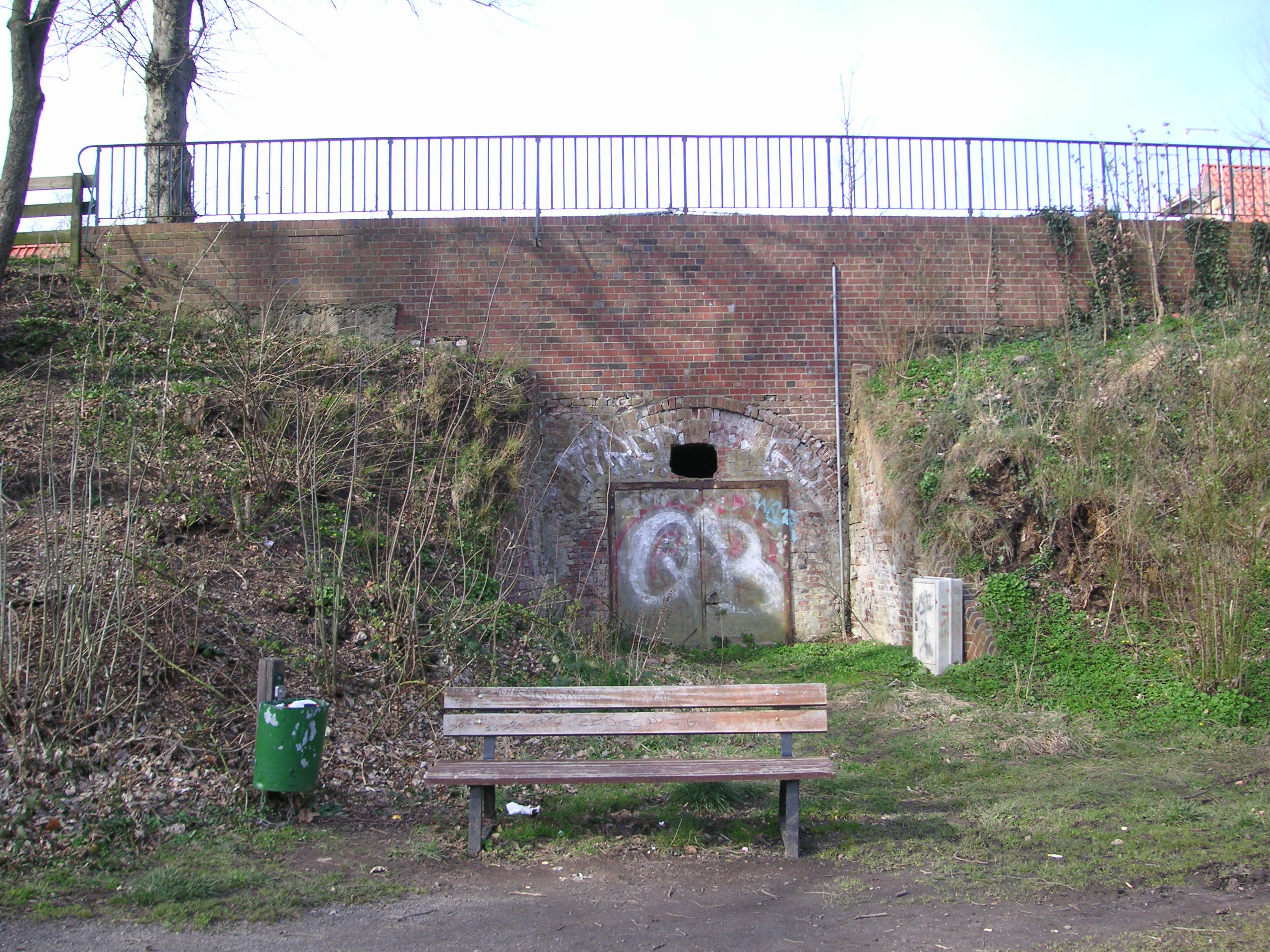

- Location within Lower Saxony
- Location: Stade, Lower Saxony
- Coordinates: 53°35′39″N 9°27′42″E
- Basin countries: Germany
- Surface area: 3.75 ha (9.3 acres)
- Average depth: 4–5 m (13–16 ft)
- Max. depth: 9 m (30 ft)
- Surface elevation: 6 m (20 ft)

Horstsee is a lake in Stade, Lower Saxony, Germany. At an elevation of 6 m, its surface area is 3.75 ha.
