= Bothmer =

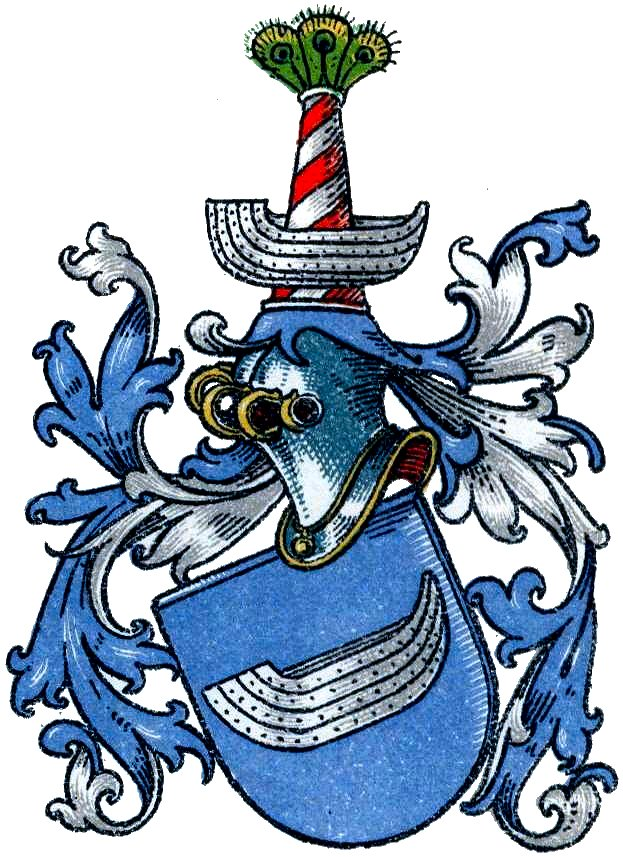
Coat of arms of Bothmer family

The House of Bothmer is the name of an ancient German noble comital family whose members occupied significant military and diplomatic positions in the Kingdom of Hanover, Kingdom of Bavaria and later within the German Empire.

== History ==
The family was first mentioned in written document from the 12th century and the progenitor of the family is considered to be Dietrich, Ritter de Botmerere (1183–1222). They were named after their estate in Bothmer, near Schwarmstedt, which was on the confluence of the rivers Aller and Leine. On 4 November 1713, they were granted the title of Imperial Count by Charles VI, Holy Roman Emperor. The title was heritable by all legitimate male-line descendants.

== Notable members ==
- Dietrich von Bothmer (1918–2009), German-born art historian
- Felix Graf von Bothmer (1852–1937), German general
- Hans Caspar von Bothmer (1656–1732), Hanoverian politician
- Lenelotte von Bothmer (1915–1997), German politician (SPD)
