= Privy Council of Hanover =

Administrative branch of the government of Hanover

The Privy Council of the Electorate of Hanover, formally known as Brunswick-Lüneburg, was the administrative branch of the electoral (and later royal) government of Hanover. Its members were known as ministers and often controlled indirectly the other branches of the government, except the military which was always under the direct control of the elector. At least one minister was always with the elector in London between the years 1714 and 1837 as the head of the German Chancery.

== Background ==
The Privy Council gained prominence when Georg Ludwig became King of Great Britain and Ireland in 1714, leaving management of Hanover to the states via his reglement. At times, the Privy Council was very powerful, especially after the accession of George III, who never personally traveled to Hanover nor left a regent in his stead. After 1813, Adolphus, Duke of Cambridge was installed as Governor of Hanover (later to be promoted to Governor-General in 1816, and then Viceroy in 1831), slowly ending the relative autonomy of the Privy Council. Upon the accession of Ernst August in 1837, thereby ending the dynastic union between Great Britain and Hanover, the Privy Council returned to its pre-1714 function as an advisory council to the king.

== Premiere Ministers of the Privy Council ==
While technically all the ministers of the council were equal in rank, a head was appointed for the purpose of calling, opening, and closing meetings. This individual, although technically equal to the other members, often became the leader of the Privy Council and would direct decisions. The title became synonymous with that of 'Prime Minister during the terms of some of its holders, although others wielded less power. Some of the premiere ministers include:

- Andreas Gottlieb, Count von Bernstorff (1709–1714)
- Hans Caspar, Baron von Bothmer (1727–1732)
- Heinrich, Baron Grote (1735–1753)
- Gerlach Adolph, Baron von Münchhausen (1753–1770)
- Levin Adolph, Baron von Hake (1770–1771)
