= Hans Caspar von Bothmer =

Hanoverian diplomat and politician

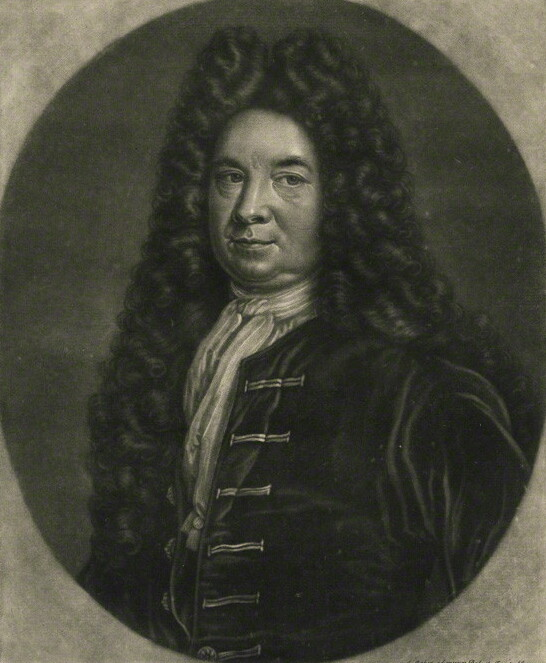
- Born: 1656; Bothmer, Electorate of Brunswick-Lüneburg
- Died: 5 February 1732 (aged 75–76); London, Kingdom of Great Britain
- Occupations: Diplomat, politician
- Known for: Advisor to British monarchs; instrumental in the Hanoverian Succession

Hans Caspar Graf von Bothmer (1656 – 5 February 1732) was a Hanoverian diplomat and politician. He is most notable for his time spent in Britain after 1701, when he served as an advisor to several British monarchs.

== Early life and career ==
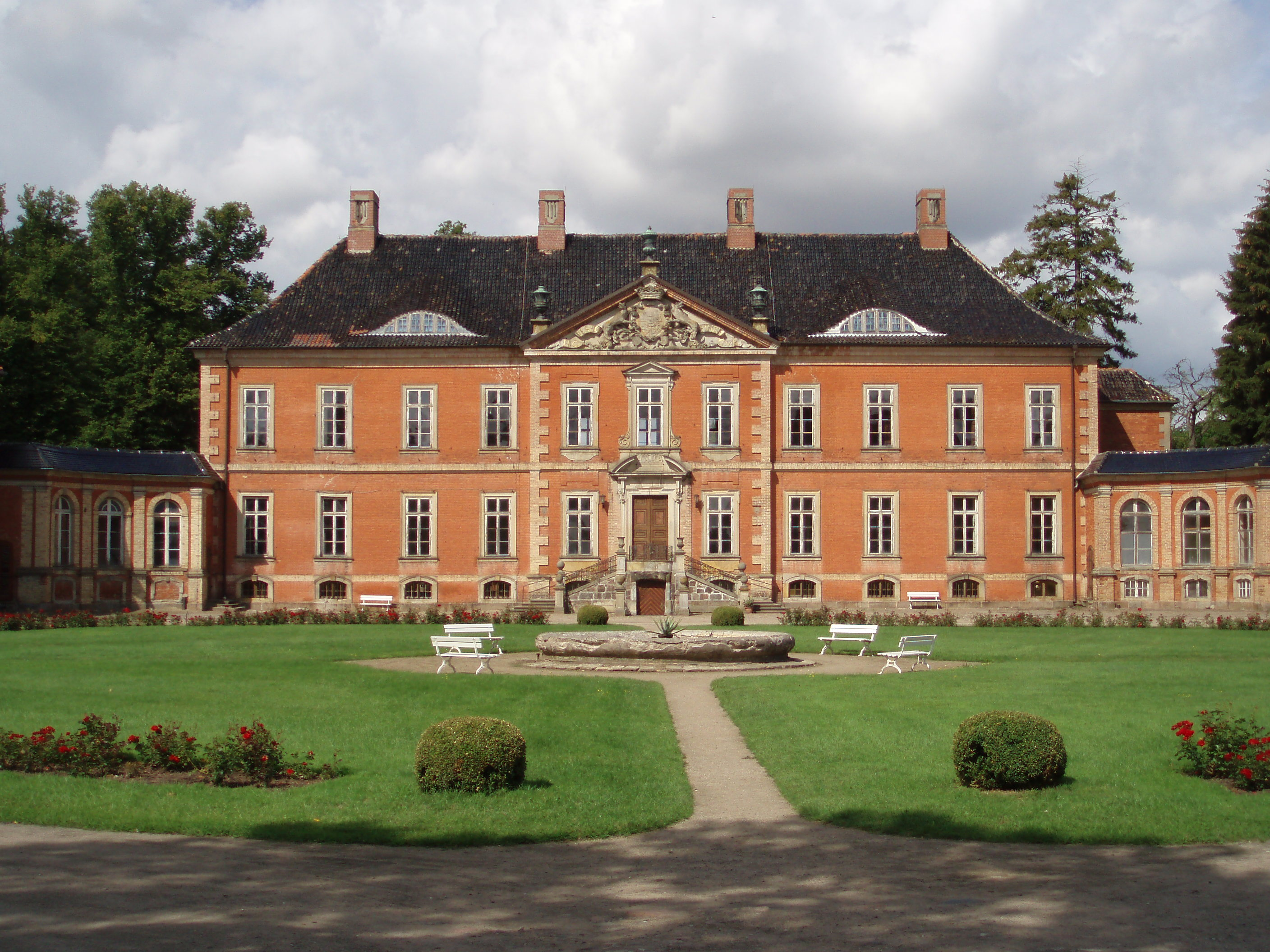
Bothmer Castle near Klütz, Mecklenburg, built by Count Bothmer

Bothmer was a member of the household Sophia Dorothea, wife of George the son and heir of the Ernest Augustus, Duke of Hanover while George was taking part in the Siege of Vienna in 1683. He rose in the service of the family, elevated after 1692 from Dukes to Electors of Hanover, performing a series of diplomatic missions. and in 1701 he was appointed as the Hanoverian envoy in London. The Act of Settlement established that following Queen Anne, the crown should pass to her nearest Protestant relations. This meant the distant Hanoverian branch of the family rather than her Catholic half-brother James Stuart, the Jacobite claimant. He was appointed an Imperial Baron in 1696, and was known in London as Baron von Bothmer even after he was elevated to the title of Imperial Count in 1713.

== Envoy in London ==
He grew to be a confidante of the British Queen Anne, and after her death in 1714, he spent his time burning her secret correspondence so that it would not fall into the hands of her enemies. He was by this time a popular figure in British political society, and counted both Tories and Whigs amongst his friends.

== Hanoverian Succession ==
In 1714, he was instrumental in securing the succession of the Hanoverian King George I to the throne, rather than the rival Jacobite claimant James III & VIII who possessed an arguably stronger blood claim. In spite of this, he experienced a surprisingly turbulent relationship with the new King, and for a while he fell out of favour. In these years, he conspired with Robert Walpole, a British politician, who had also been excluded from power. In 1719 he was one of the original backers of the Royal Academy of Music, establishing a London opera company which commissioned numerous works from Handel, Bononcini and others.

He lived at 10 Downing Street from 1720 to his death on 5 February 1732 after which it was taken over by Robert Walpole, and became the residence of future British Prime Ministers.

== See also ==
- Schloss Bothmer, his residence in present-day Mecklenburg-Vorpommern.

== Bibliography ==
- Browning, Reed. The Duke of Newcastle. Yale University Press, 1975.
- Hatton, Ragnhild. George I. Yale University Press, 2001.
- Köhler, Marcus, Wolschke-Bulmahn, Joachim. Hanover and England: – a garden and personal union?. Akademische Verlagsgemeinschaft München, 2018.
- Pearce, Eward. The Great Man: Sir Robert Walpole Pimlico, 2008.
- Simms, Brendan. Three Victories and a Defeat: The Rise and Fall of the First British Empire. Penguin Books, 2008.
- Silke Kreibich: Hans Caspar von Bothmer. In: Biographisches Lexikon für Mecklenburg. Bd. 7, Rostock 2013, S. 41–45.
