= Brian Hargreaves =

English painter

Brian Hargreaves FRSA, FRES
- Born: 27 May 1935; Sutton-in-Craven, Yorkshire, England
- Died: 30 September 2011 (aged 76)
- Education: Keighley Grammar School; Keighley School of Arts and Crafts; Camberwell School of Arts and Crafts
- Occupation: Scientific illustrator

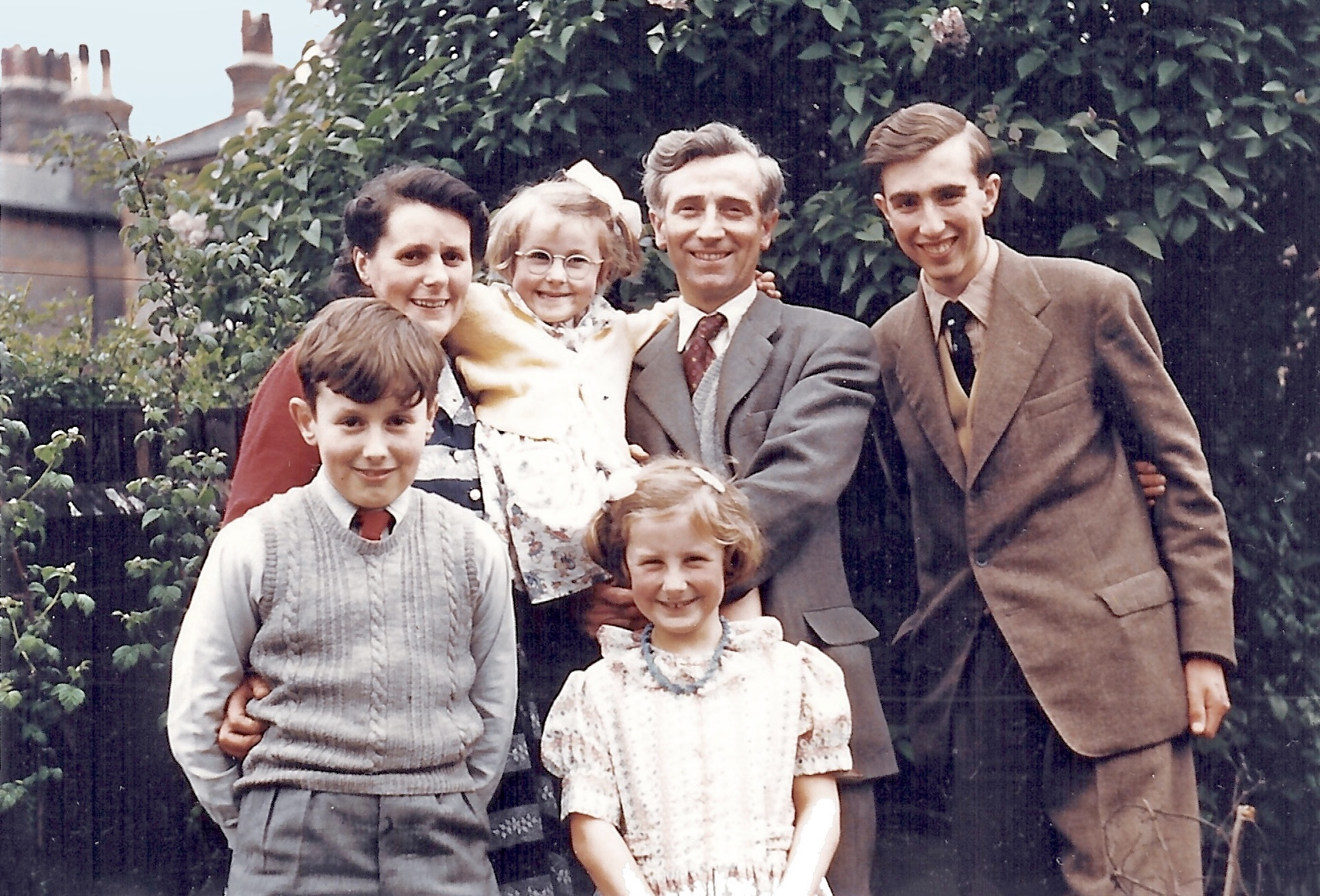
Brian Hargreaves (right) with Arthur Smith & Family. Early 1950s.

Brian Hargreaves FRSA, FRES (1935-2011) was an English artist and scientific illustrator, known for his depictions of Lepidoptera.

== Early life ==
Hargreaves was born on 27 May 1935 at Sutton-in-Craven, Yorkshire. He was educated at Keighley Grammar School, Keighley School of Arts and Crafts and Camberwell School of Arts and Crafts. While at Camberwell he lived with his uncle, the internationally respected entomological artist, Arthur Smith. At Camberwell he met Joyce, who later became his wife. They were each awarded the National Diploma of Design there. As well as working as an artist and illustrator in her own right, she subsequently worked with him on some of his publications.

== Career ==
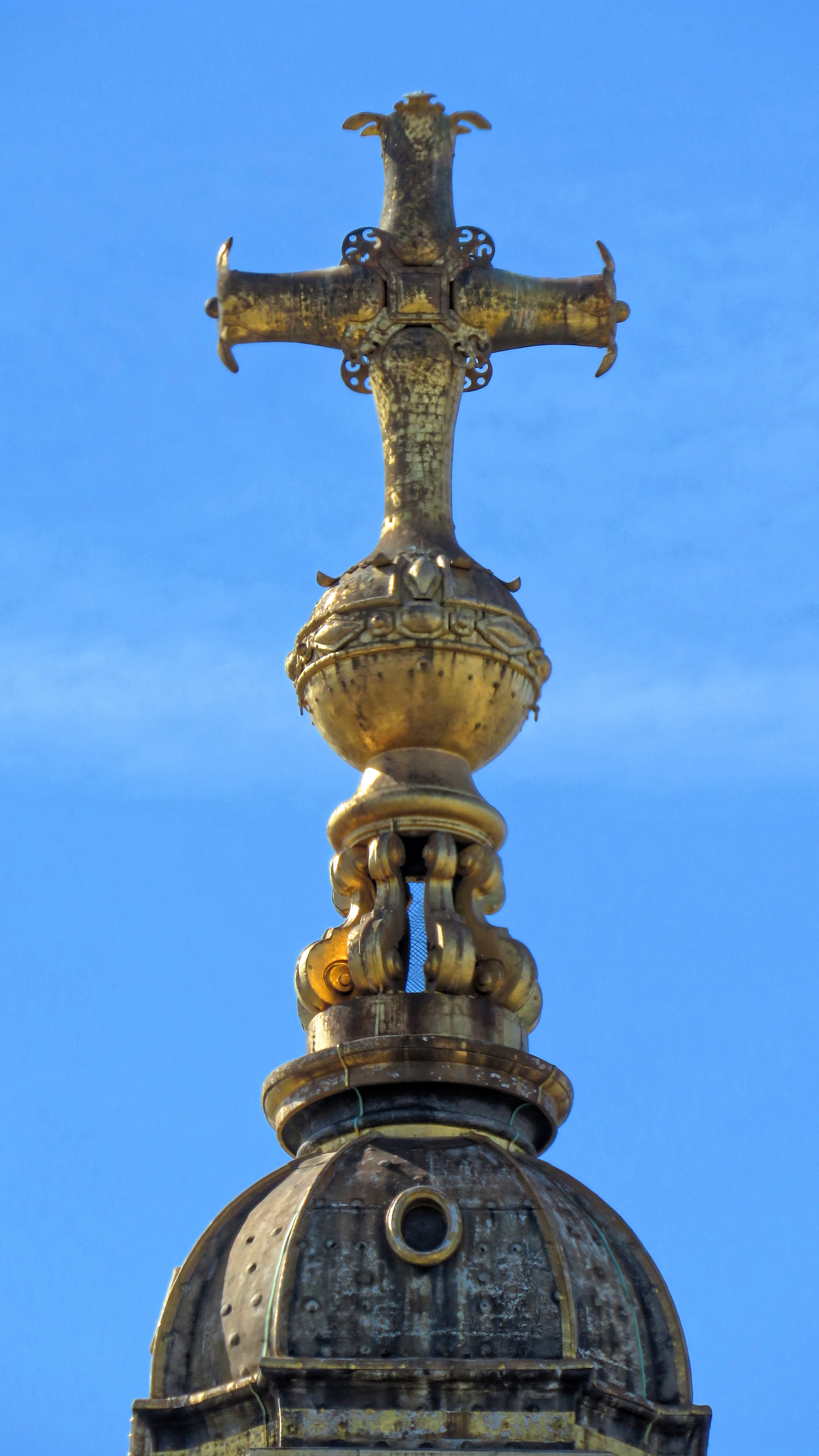
Lantern ball and cross atop the dome of St Paul's Cathedral

Hargreaves early career was in church restoration; he gilded the lantern ball and cross that sits on top of the dome of St Paul's Cathedral.

He became the first artist to illustrate every one of the butterflies of Britain and Europe, doing so in the book Butterflies of Britain and Europe, which was eventually published in nine languages, and in the United States. As a result, his work was exhibited at the Smithsonian Institution in Washington, D.C.

He illustrated Butterflies on My Mind (1978) for the actress Dulcie Gray, who was also vice president of the British Butterfly Conservation Society. The book, which was designed by Joyce Hargreaves, won the Times Educational Supplement Senior Information Book Award.

For his work on Pests, Diseases and Disorders of Garden Plants, he was awarded the Royal Horticultural Society's gold medal. Another was given for Field Guide of Caterpillars and Their Food Plants, which he illustrated.

In 1997 he undertook a commission to draw the Natural History Museum's wildlife garden.

He designed several series of porcelain ornaments, modelled on butterflies, for Franklin Mint.

He enjoyed fellowship of the Royal Society of Arts, the Royal Entomological Society, and the Free Painters and Sculptors, as well as membership of the Guild of Lettering Craftsmen.

Hargreaves died on 30 September 2011, following a heart attack. At that time, he and Joyce were living in Playden, East Sussex. His funeral was held at Hastings Crematorium.

== Legacy ==
Eighty-eight of his drawings, mostly watercolours, are in the collection of the Natural History Museum.

His works have been used on the postage stamps of Cocos (Keeling) Islands, Gabon, Norfolk Island, and Togo. He supplied work to Royal Mail for a set of United Kingdom postage stamps, depicting two-spot ladybirds, but these were not used.

His painting Butterfly: Large Blue is in the Royal Collection. It was a gift to Queen Elizabeth II from the Royal Entomological Society in 2002, to mark her Golden Jubilee.

== Bibliography ==
Books illustrated by Hargreaves include:

- Higgins, L. D.; Riley, N. D. (1970). A Field Guide to the Butterflies of Great Britain and Europe.
- Bradley, John David; Tremewan, W. G.; Tremewan, G. (1973). British Tortricoid Moths. Vol. One. Ray Society.
  - Bradley, John David; Tremewan, W. G.; Tremewan, G. (1979). British Tortricoid Moths. Vol. Two. Ray Society.
- Riley, N. D. (1975). A Field Guide to the Butterflies of the West Indies.
- Various (1976) The Moths and Butterflies of Great Britain and Ireland (several volumes)
- Gray, Dulcie (1978). Butterflies on My Mind.
- Buczacki, S. T.; Harris, K. M. (1981). Collins Guide to the Pests and Disorders of Garden Pests.
- with Chinery, Michael (1981). Collins Gem Guide: Butterflies and Moths. Collins.

He wrote and illustrated:

- Exploring Rye with Brian Hargreaves.
- Exploring Romney Marsh with Brian Hargreaves.
