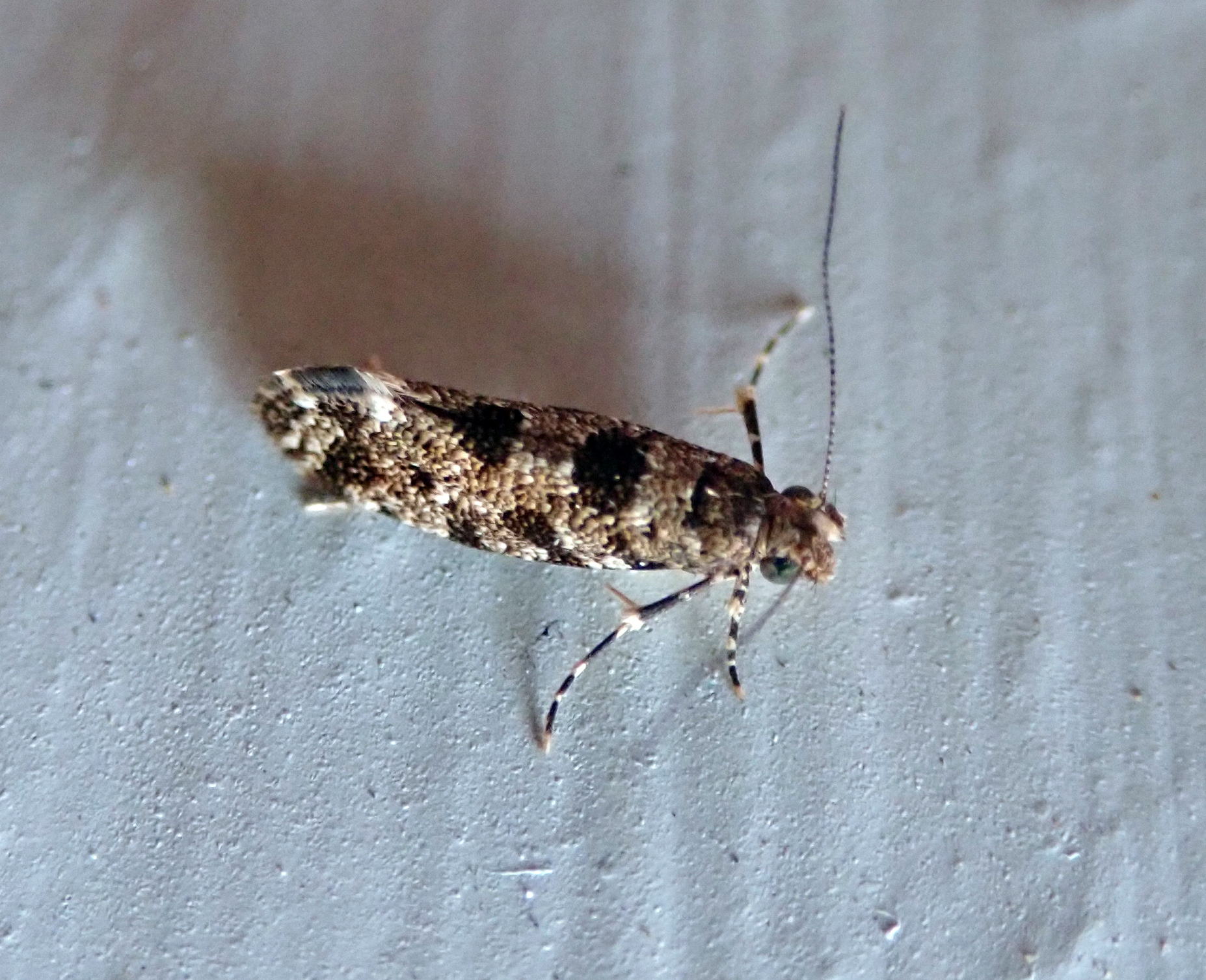

Scientific classification
- Kingdom: Animalia
- Phylum: Arthropoda
- Class: Insecta
- Order: Lepidoptera
- Family: Tineidae
- Genus: Parochmastis
- Species: P. hilderi

Binomial name
- Parochmastis hilderi (Bradley, 1956)

Synonyms
- Norfolkia hilderi Bradley, 1956

= Parochmastis hilderi =

Species of moth endemic to New Zealand

Parochmastis hilderi is a moth of the family Tineidae first described by John David Bradley in 1856. It is found in Australia and New Zealand.
