= George Lane (British Army officer) =

British Army officer and Commando (1915–2010)

- Born: György Lányi; 18 January 1915; Upper Hungary, Austria-Hungary
- Died: 19 March 2010 (aged 95); United Kingdom
- Spouses: Miriam Rothschild (m. 1943; div. 1957); Elizabeth Heald (m. 1963)
- Children: 6, including Charles Daniel Lane
- Military career
- Allegiance: United Kingdom
- Branch: Special Operations Executive; British Army
- Service years: 1939–1945
- Rank: Colonel
- Unit: No. 10 (Inter-Allied) Commando
- Conflicts: World War II; Operation Tarbrush
- Awards: Military Cross

George Henry Lane, MC (born Gyuri or György Lányi; 18 January 1915 – 19 March 2010) was a British Army officer in the Commandos during World War II, achieving the rank of colonel. He performed a number of missions behind enemy lines. Captured on one such mission, Lane was spared after he had tea with Erwin Rommel, and later escaped.

== Early life ==
Lane was born in Upper Hungary, with the birth name Gyuri or György Lányi. His family were Jewish; his father, Ernest Lányi, was a wealthy landowner. The family moved to Budapest after the end of the First World War, when his parents' land was allocated to the new state of Czechoslovakia by the Treaty of Versailles.

He moved to London in 1935, where he befriended the Dean of Windsor, Albert Baillie. He studied at Christ Church, Oxford and then read English at the University of London, but also trained with the Hungary men's national water polo team, and wrote for a Hungarian newspaper on a freelance basis.

== Second World War ==
After the outbreak of the Second World War, he volunteered to join the British Army. He was accepted as an officer cadet by the Grenadier Guards, but as an alien was also served with a deportation notice. Connections via Baillie with Anthony Eden, David Margesson and James Thomas removed the threat of deportation, and he served for a year as a sergeant in the Alien Pioneer Corps. He joined SOE, and undertook clandestine missions in occupied Belgium and the Netherlands. After he refused to serve with SOE in Hungary, he transferred first to No. 4 Commando and then the German-speaking X Troop (later 3 Troop) in No. 10 Commando. He was commissioned in 1943.

He met the entomologist Miriam Rothschild the same year, while recuperating at her house in Northamptonshire. She was herself partly of Hungarian descent; the couple married in August 1943. They had six children, four biological: Mary Rozsiska (1945–2010), Charles Daniel (born 1948), Charlotte Teresa (born 1951) and Johanna Miriam (born 1951); and two adopted.

While commanding one of the Operation Tarbrush commando reconnaissance raids on the coast of the Pas de Calais shortly before D-Day, Lane was captured by the Germans on 18–19 May 1944. He expected to be executed in accordance with Hitler's Commando Order but instead he was questioned over tea by Field Marshal Rommel, with Lane pretending to know no German, and to be Welsh to hide his Hungarian accent when speaking English; von Tempelhoff noticed during the interview that he had an accent, possibly Eastern European (the commanding officer of 3 Troop, Captain Bryan Hilton Jones, was Welsh). Lane was then imprisoned at Fresnes Prison near Paris and then Oflag IX-A/H at Spangenberg Castle in Hesse.

He later escaped and was liberated, finding shelter with his brother-in-law Victor Rothschild in Paris, whose house had plenty of Château Lafite and Dom Pérignon but no hot water. He was awarded the Military Cross for his war service, for his part in the Tarbrush raids.

== Later life ==
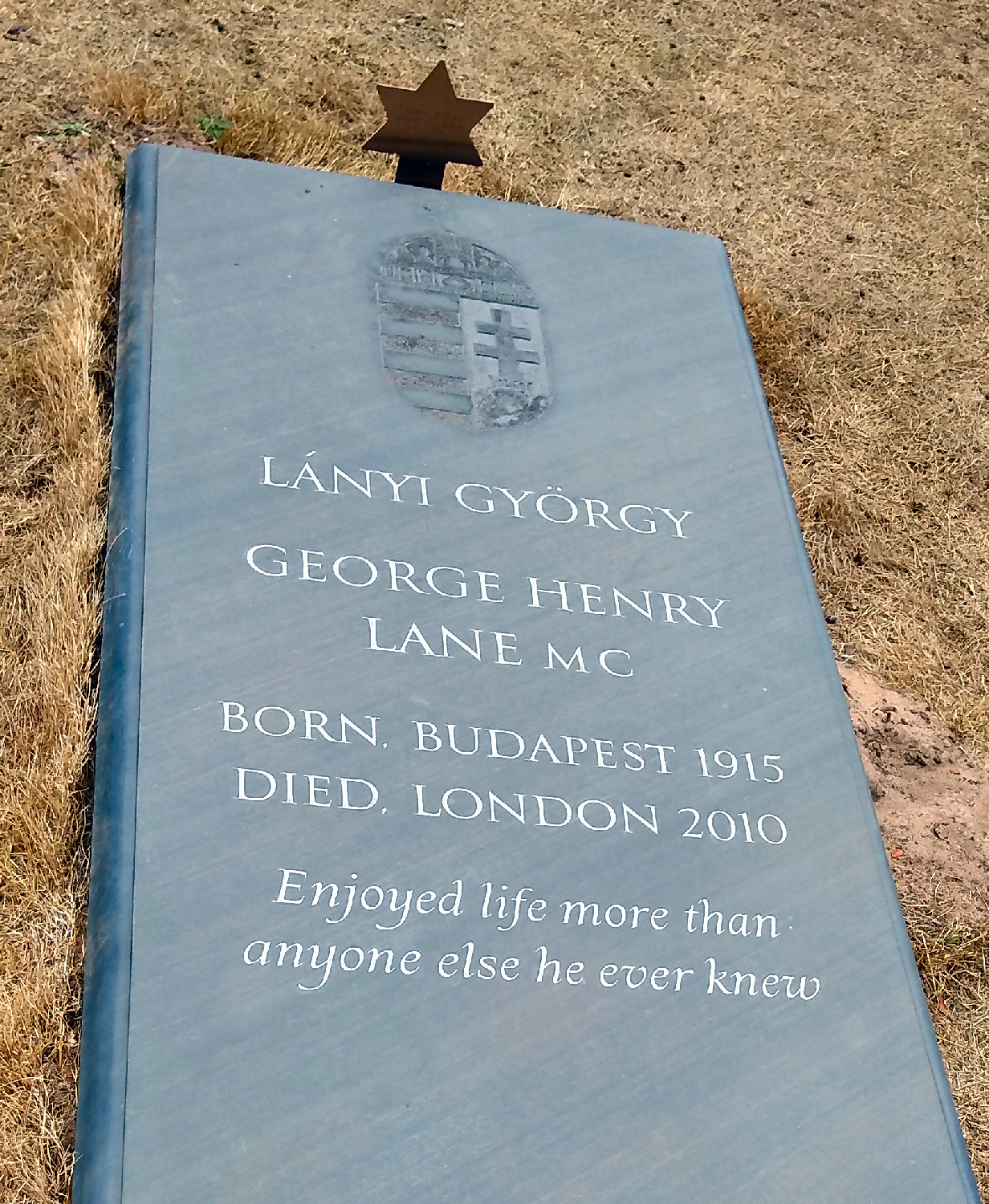
Grave, St Martha-on-the-Hill

He was formally naturalised as British in 1946. He assisted his wife to run her estate at Ashton Wold near Oundle in Northamptonshire after the war, until they divorced in 1957.

He moved to the US and worked as a stockbroker. He married Elizabeth Heald in 1963. She was the daughter of Conservative politician and former Attorney General Sir Lionel Heald. They lived in London, where he died in 2010.
