= Jarmila Kukalová-Peck =

Czech-born Canadian paleoentomologist (1930–2024)

- Born: Jarmila Kukalová; July 28, 1930; Prague, Czech Republic
- Died: August 13, 2024 (aged 94)
- Education: Charles University, Prague
- Occupation: Paleoentomologist
- Known for: Epicoxal theory
- Spouse: Stewart Peck
- Awards: Entomological Society of Canada’s Gold Medal (1996)

Jarmila Kukalová-Peck (July 28, 1930 – August 13, 2024) was a Czech-born Canadian paleoentomologist known for her theories on insect wings and their evolution, particularly her epicoxal theory. Kukalová-Peck's contributions included: a new scheme for wing vein structure, a hypothetical scheme of the ancestral insect wing, and a new proposal regarding the original components of the arthropod leg.

== Biography ==
Jarmila Kukalová was born in Prague, Czech Republic, on July 28, 1930. She attended Charles University, Prague, where she received her MS in geology, magna cum laude (1956), and her Ph.D. in paleontology (1962). She joined the faculty there in 1970 and became a widely recognized insect paleontologist. During this period, she was also invited to make two visits to the Museum of Comparative Zoology at Harvard University, where she served as a lecturer (1968–1969). It was at Harvard that she met her future husband.

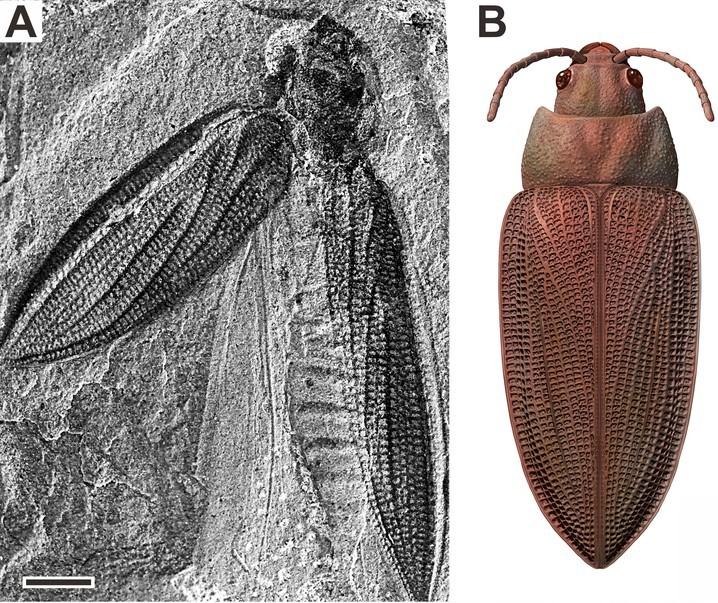
Examples of Permian beetles. (A and B) Tshekardocoleidae, Moravocoleus permianus Kukalová, 1969, photograph and reconstruction.

In 1970, Kukalová married American-born entomologist Stewart Peck, who shared several of her passions, especially beetles. They moved to Carleton University in Ottawa, Canada, where they established their home. Stewart joined the faculty there and Jarmila taught as an adjunct professor and published new research.

The husband-wife pair travelled the world for more than 50 years building their insect collections and publishing their findings, thus "sharing their passion about science, biodiversity and evolution." Throughout her foraging career, Kukalová-Peck donated many specimens to the Canadian Museum of Nature in Ottawa. In 2018 alone, she expanded her donations by giving the museum "her life’s collection of thousands of fossil insects" as well as her personal library.

=== Epicoxal theory ===
In her 1983 publication, Kukalová-Peck described her novel epicoxal theory, which was called "revolutionary" by Takahiro Ohde in his 2025 paper on insect wing evolution. With this theory, she proposed that the wing originated from an epicoxal succession of the insect leg, hence the name epicoxal theory.

Jarmila Kukalová-Peck died at 94 on August 13, 2024.

=== Selected honors ===
- Royal Society of Canada, Fellow
- Entomological Society of the Czech Republic, Honorary Life Member
- Awarded the Entomological Society of Canada’s Gold Medal in 1996 "for her groundbreaking research." She was the first woman to receive this honour.

== Selected works ==
- Kukalová-Peck, Jarmila. "Origin of the insect wing and wing articulation from the arthropodan leg." Canadian Journal of Zoology 61, no. 7 (1983): 1618–1669.
- Kukalová-Peck, Jarmila, and John F. Lawrence. "Evolution of the hind wing in Coleoptera." The Canadian Entomologist 125, no. 2 (1993): 181-258.
- Kukalová-Peck, Jarmila, and John F. Lawrence. "Relationships among coleopteran suborders and major endoneopteran lineages: evidence from hind wing characters." European Journal of Entomology 101, no. 1 (2004): 95-144.
