= Eje =

Eje or EJE may refer to:

== People ==
- Eje Thelin (1938–1990), Swedish trombonist
- Niels Eje (born 1954), Danish composer and oboist
- Thomas Eje (born 1957), Danish actor

== Other uses ==
- Eje (goddess), in Turkic religions and Tengriism
- Elgin, Joliet and Eastern Railway, a defunct, American railway
- European Journal of Endocrinology
- European Journal of Entomology
