= Conkers =

Children's game

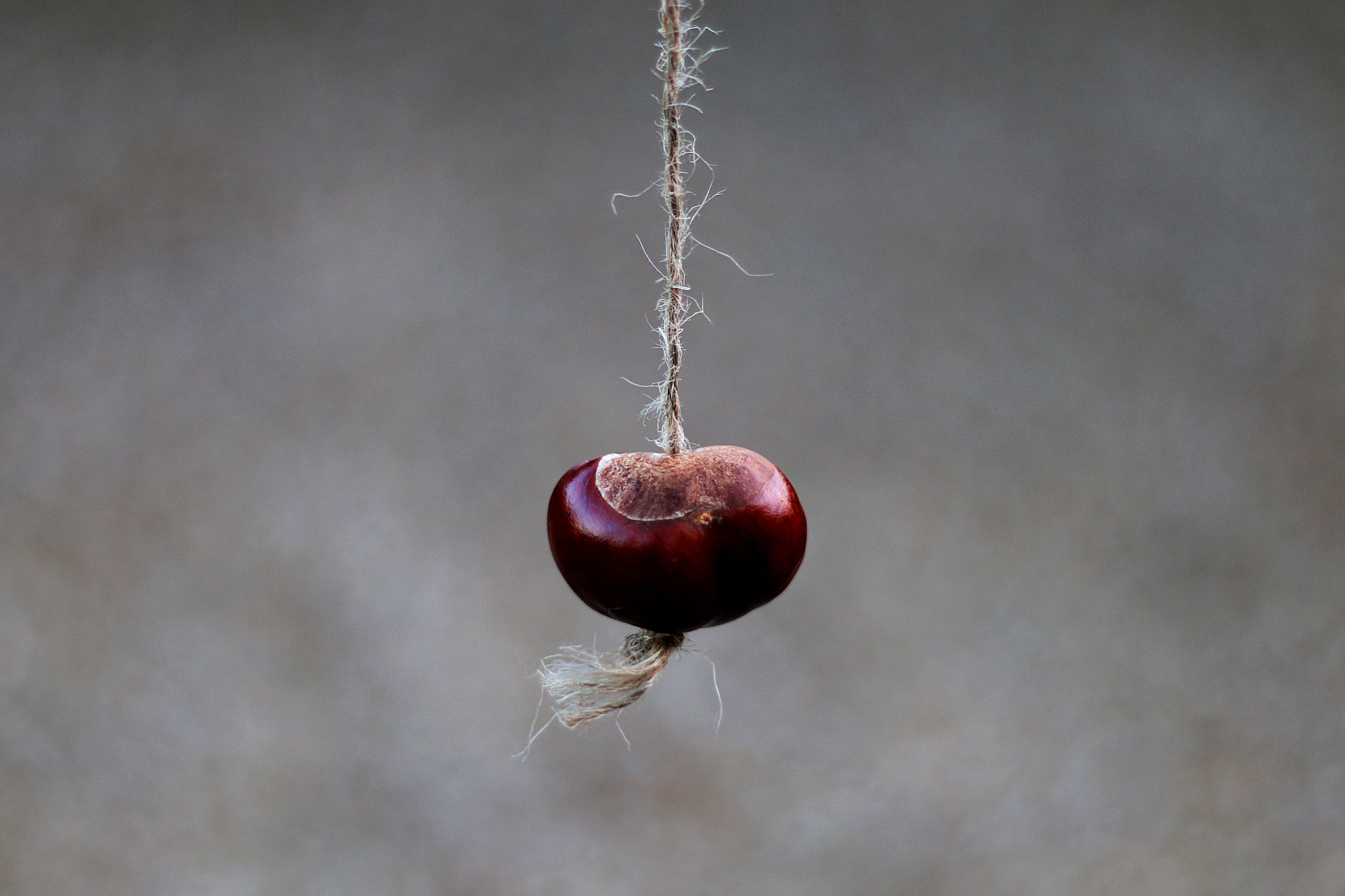
The game of conkers is played with a horse-chestnut seed with a string threaded through it.

Conkers is a traditional children's game in Great Britain and Ireland played using the seeds of horse chestnut trees—the name 'conker' is also applied to the seed and to the tree itself. The game is played by two players, each with a conker threaded onto a piece of string: they take turns striking each other's conker until one breaks.

== Origin ==
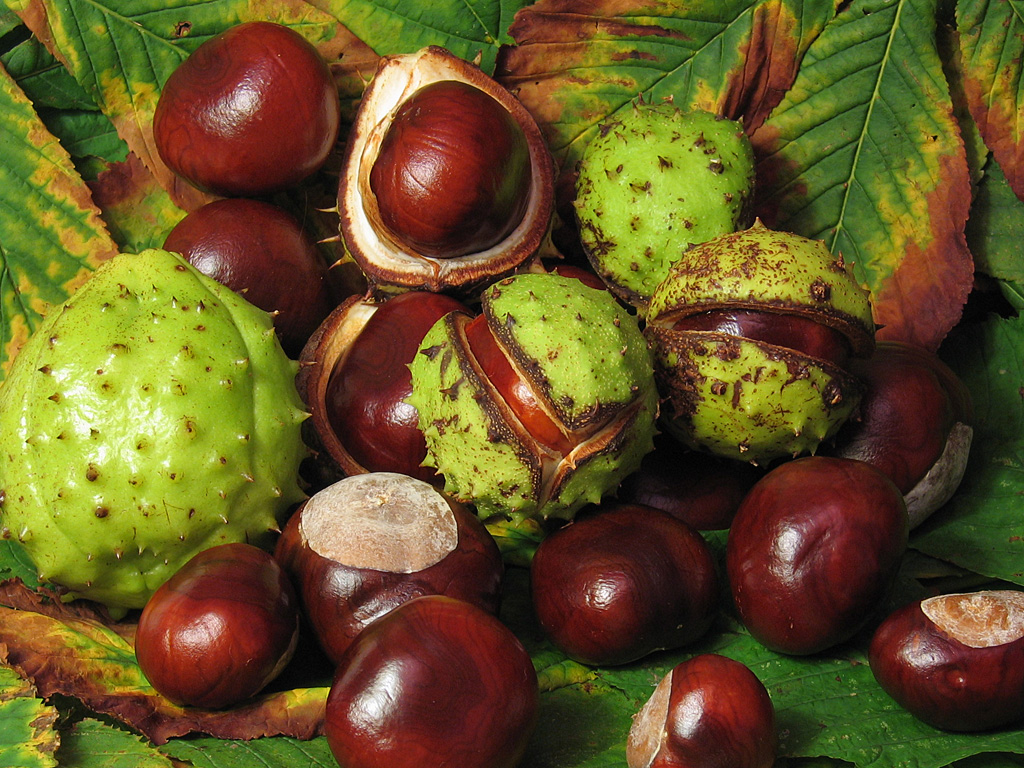
A selection of fresh conkers from a horse chestnut tree

The first mention of the game is in Robert Southey's memoirs published in 1821. He describes a similar game, but played with snail shells or hazelnuts. It was only from the 1850s that using horse chestnuts was regularly referred to in certain regions.

There is uncertainty of the origins of the name. The name may come from the dialect word conker, meaning "knock out" (perhaps related to French conque meaning a conch, as the game was originally played using snail shells and small bits of string). The name may also be influenced by the verb conquer, as earlier games involving shells and hazelnuts have also been called conquerors. Compton MacKenzie's 1913 novel Sinister Street uses the name Conquerors.

Another possibility is that it is an onomatopoeia, representing the sound made by a horse chestnut as it hits another hard object, such as a skull (another children's "game", also called conkers, consists of simply throwing the seeds at one another over a fence or wall). Conkers are also known regionally as cheesers, a "cheeser" being a conker with one or more flat sides, which comes about due to it sharing its pod with other conkers (twins or triplets). Also Cheggers was used in Lancaster, England in the 1920s. In D. H. Lawrence's book Sons and Lovers, the game is referred to as cobblers by William Morel.

== History ==
The first recorded game of conkers using horse chestnuts was on the Isle of Wight in 1848. The game grew in popularity in the 19th century, and spread beyond England.

== Game ==
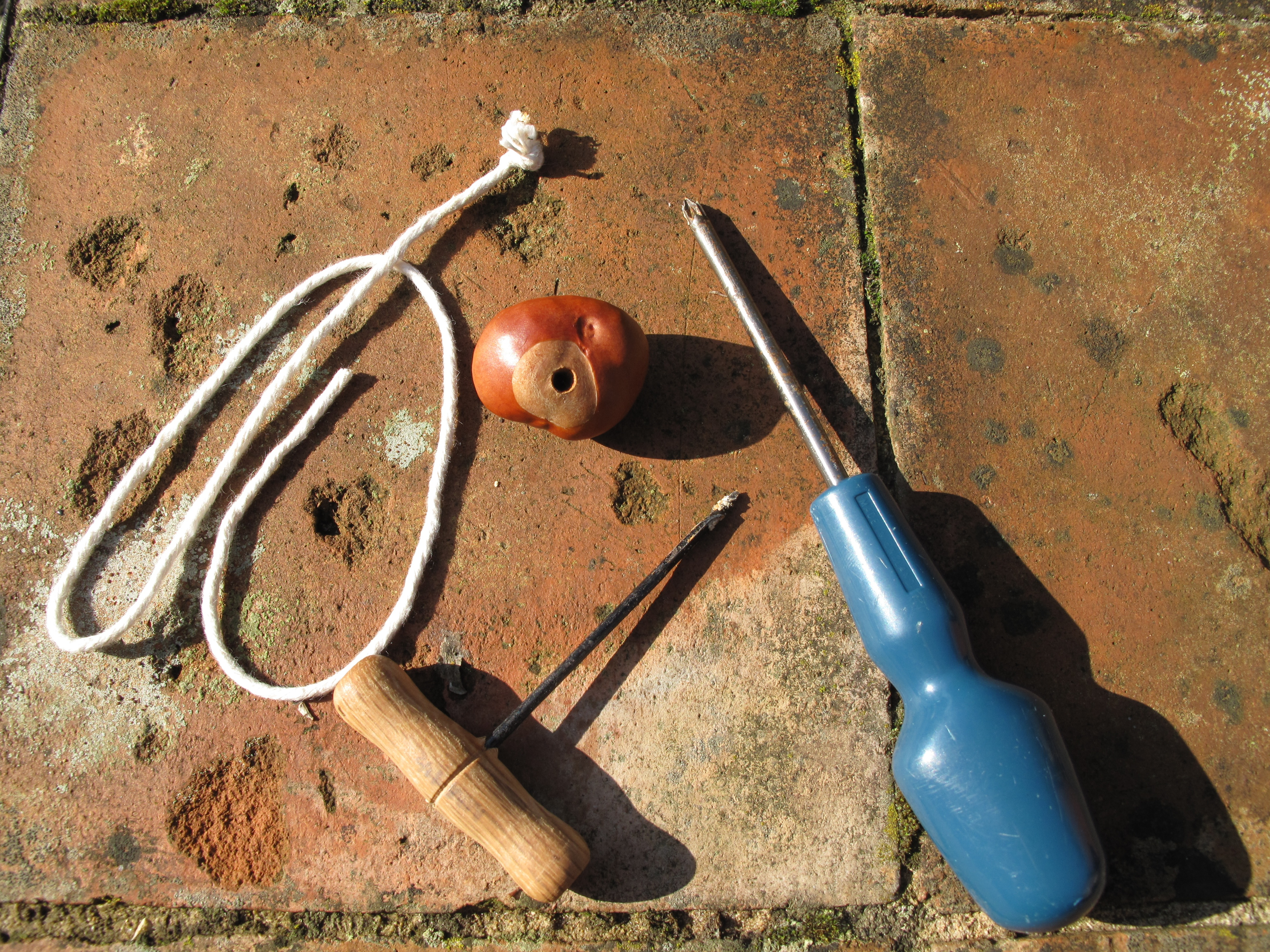
Tools used to string a conker

Before the game, each player must prepare a conker. A hole is bored in a large, hard conker using a nail, gimlet, small screwdriver, or electric drill. A piece of string (often a shoelace is used), about 20 cm (8 inches) long, is threaded through it. A large knot at one or both ends of the string secures the conker.

=== Play ===
The game is played between two people, each with a conker. They take turns hitting each other's conker using their own. One player lets the conker dangle on the full length of the string and the other player swings their conker to hit it.

A point is scored for a conker surviving a hit that causes the other one to break. The point is scored irrespective of whether the surviving conker was attacking or defending at the time.

The scoring of the game is considered to be a property of the conkers themselves. A new conker is a none-er, meaning that it has not defeated any others yet and thus has no score. As a conker accumulates points, its designation changes to reflect the total: a none-er becomes a one-er, then a two-er, and so on. (In some areas of Scotland, conker victories are counted using the terms bully-one, bully-two, etc. In some areas of the United States and Canada, conker victories are counted using the terms one-kinger, two-kinger, etc. In 1940s Brooklyn, New York, a winning chestnut was referred to as a killer and the value of a chestnut was defined by its number of "kills".)

In some regions, the winning conker receives all the points accumulated by the losing one, in addition to gaining one more point for the defeat. For example, a two-er that defeats a three-er would become a six-er (2 + 3 + 1). Other regions only award one point to the winner, regardless of the loser's score.

=== Variant rules ===
- If the strings become entangled, the first player to shout "strings" or "stringsies" has an extra turn.
- If one player drops their conker, the other can shout "stamps" or "stampsies" entitling them to try and break the conker on the ground by stamping on it. Shouting "no stamps" before the other player can shout "stamps" prevents any stamping.

=== Hardening conkers ===
The hardest conkers usually win. Hardening conkers is often done by keeping them for a year (aged conkers are called laggies in many areas or seasoners in Ireland and Liverpool), baking them briefly, soaking or boiling in vinegar, or painting with clear nail varnish. Such hardening is, however, usually regarded as cheating.

At the British Junior Conkers Championships on the Isle of Wight in October 2005, contestants were banned from bringing their own conkers out of fears that they might harden them. The Campaign for Real Conkers claimed this was an example of over-regulation which was causing a drop in interest in the game. In both the World Conker Championship and the North American Championship, contestants are also restricted to using the conkers provided by the organisers.

One factor affecting the strength of a conker is the shape of the hole. A clean cylindrical hole is stronger, as it has no notches or chips that can begin a crack or split.

The Peckham Conker Championships allow artificially hardened conkers, with some players even coating their conkers in epoxy resin. This competition follows Battle Royale rules and also allows stampsies and stringies.

=== Similar game ===
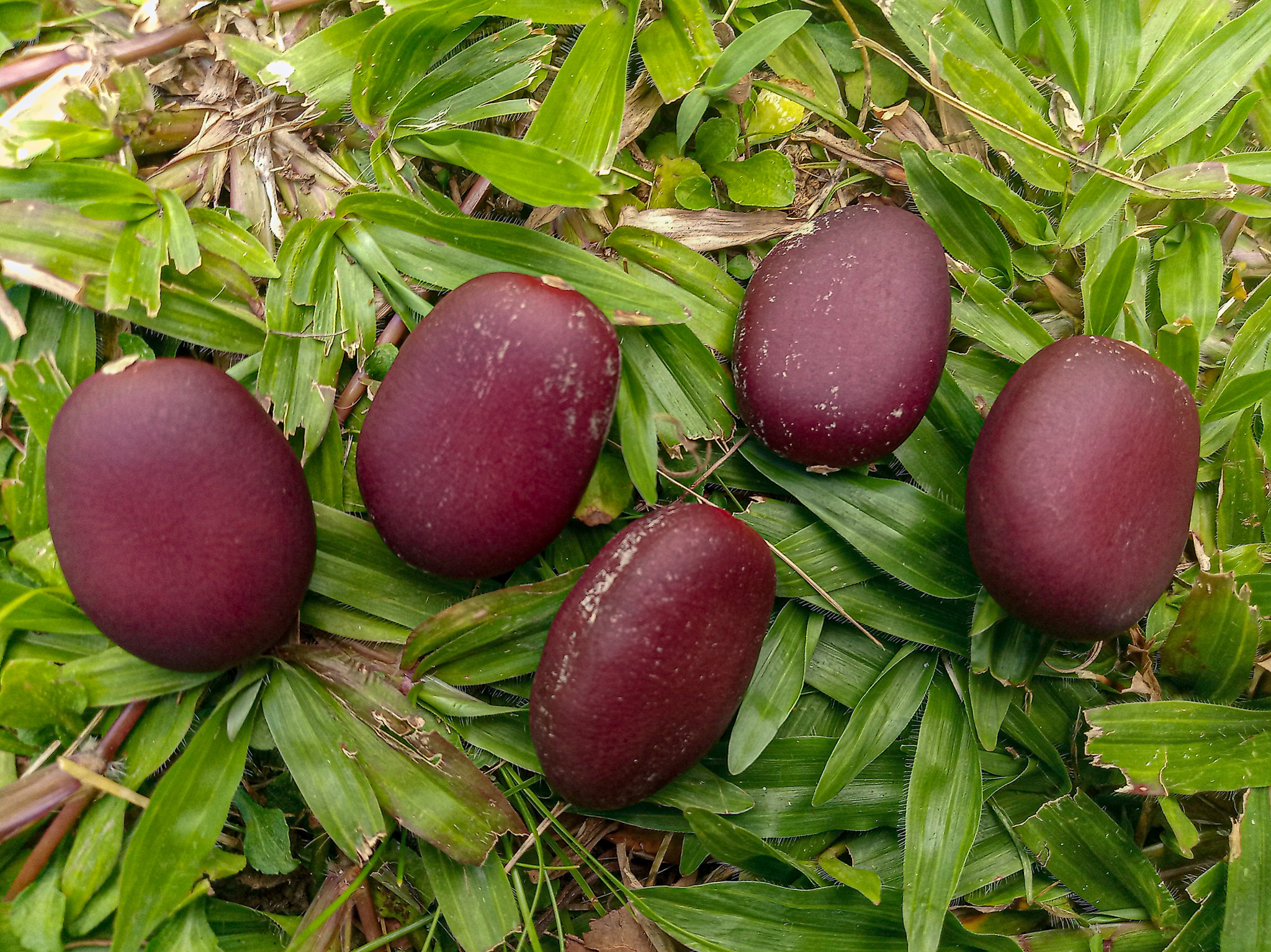
Hymenaea courbaril seeds are used to play a similar game in Puerto Rico.

A similar Puerto Rican game (played with the smaller seed of the jatobá, Hymenaea courbaril) is called gallitos (meaning small roosters or cocks, as in cockfighting). The opponents face each other and the defending gallito is laid in the center of a circle drawn in the dirt. Not until the attacking player misses will the defending player take a turn. Upon missing, if the attacking player is quick enough, they will try to swing at the defending gallito before the defendant removes it from within the circle. If the defending gallito is struck it must remain in the circle until the attacker misses again. This move is called a "paso de paloma".

== Championships ==
In 1965, the World Conker Championships were set up in Ashton (near Oundle) Northamptonshire, England, and still take place on the second Sunday of October every year. In 2004, an audience of 5,000 turned up to watch more than 500 competitors from all over the world. The 2016 Championship was featured on the BBC programme "Countryfile".

The first time that a non-British contestant won the Men's World Conker Championship was in 1976. The Mexican Jorge Ramirez Carrillo took the place of a contestant who was unable to arrive on time at Ashton, and defeated the 1975 champion at the finals. The men's champion has been British in every other year except 1998, when Helmut Kern from Nauort, Germany, won.

In 1999, the Irish Conker Championships began in Freshford, County Kilkenny, in Ireland.

Selma Becker, originally from Austria, was the first ladies' champion from outside the UK, in 2000. The title of Queen of Conkers has remained in the UK, except in 2001 when Frenchwoman Celine Parachou won.

Eamonn Dooley from Freshford in County Kilkenny, Ireland broke the world record in 2000 by smashing 306 conkers in one hour.

In 2004, an alternative World Conker Championships was first hosted at Pill Harriers Rugby Club, Newport, Wales. This championship, known as the World Annual National Conker Championships, has been held every year since and is sanctioned by Dogfish Promotions. Contestants from the United States, Italy, England and Wales have taken part.

The North American Conker Championship was inaugurated on 20 October 2012 at the Historic Gardens in the town of Annapolis Royal, Nova Scotia, Canada, hosted by the Annapolis Royal Conker Club.

The Peckham Conker Championships was first held in October 2017 in Peckham, London, playing a more extreme version of the game with Battle Royale rules which was organised by Peckham Conker Club. In 2023, more than 500 people from different parts of the UK took part in this championship.

At the 2024 World Conker Championship, controversy arose when the winner, veteran competitor David Jakins, dubbed "King Conker", was accused of cheating. Jakins was alleged to have used a replica conker made from steel. He was later exonerated.

== Safety concerns ==
In 2000, a survey of British schools by Keele University showed that many were not allowing children to play conkers, as head teachers were concerned about conkers being used as weapons, or the school being sued by parents if children were injured while playing the game. A story in the mid-2000s about children being required to wear goggles to play conkers was listed by the Health and Safety Executive (HSE) as one of its top ten health and safety myths.

In 2004, several schools in Britain banned conkers due to fear of causing anaphylactic shock in pupils with nut allergies. Health advisers said that there were no known dangers from conkers for nut-allergy sufferers, although some may experience a mild rash through handling them.

== See also ==
- Egg tapping, a similar game with eggs
