= Epimactis pulsatella =

Scientific classification
- Domain: Eukaryota
- Kingdom: Animalia
- Phylum: Arthropoda
- Class: Insecta
- Order: Lepidoptera
- Family: Lecithoceridae
- Genus: Epimactis
- Species: E. pulsatella

Binomial name
- Epimactis pulsatella Bradley, 1961

Species of moth

Epimactis pulsatella is a moth in the family Lecithoceridae. It was described by John David Bradley in 1961. It is found on Guadalcanal.
