= Cryptophlebia pallifimbriana =

Scientific classification
- Kingdom: Animalia
- Phylum: Arthropoda
- Clade: Pancrustacea
- Class: Insecta
- Order: Lepidoptera
- Family: Tortricidae
- Genus: Cryptophlebia
- Species: C. pallifimbriana

Binomial name
- Cryptophlebia pallifimbriana Bradley, 1953

Synonyms
- Cryptophlebia pallifimbriata

Species of moth

Cryptophlebia pallifimbriana is a moth of the family Tortricidae. It was described by Bradley in 1953. It is found on Fiji, the Austral Islands, the Cook Islands, the Marquesas Islands, New Guinea, the New Hebrides and the Society Islands. It has also been recorded from the Australian state of Queensland.

The wingspan is about 24 mm.

The larvae bore the fruits of Inocarpus fagifer and Inocarpus edulis.
