= Epimactis crambalea =

Scientific classification
- Domain: Eukaryota
- Kingdom: Animalia
- Phylum: Arthropoda
- Class: Insecta
- Order: Lepidoptera
- Family: Lecithoceridae
- Genus: Epimactis
- Species: E. crambalea

Binomial name
- Epimactis crambalea Meyrick, 1910

Species of moth

Epimactis crambalea is a moth in the family Lecithoceridae. It was described by Edward Meyrick in 1910. It is found on Java in Indonesia.

The wingspan is about 16 mm. The forewings are brownish ochreous, along the costa pale ochreous, towards the dorsum infuscated, especially anteriorly. The second discal stigma is rather large and dark fuscous. The hindwings are grey, thinly scaled towards the base and with a subdorsal groove filled with long hairs.
