= Epimactis metazona =

Scientific classification
- Domain: Eukaryota
- Kingdom: Animalia
- Phylum: Arthropoda
- Class: Insecta
- Order: Lepidoptera
- Family: Lecithoceridae
- Genus: Epimactis
- Species: E. metazona

Binomial name
- Epimactis metazona Meyrick, 1908

Species of moth

Epimactis metazona is a moth in the family Lecithoceridae. It was described by Edward Meyrick in 1908. It is found in Sierra Leone.

The wingspan is 25–26 mm. The forewings are white with the second discal stigma grey and with a narrow silvery-grey fascia close before the termen, dilated towards the costa but not quite reaching it. The hindwings are white.
