= The Ecclesbourne School =

Location
- Wirksworth Road; Duffield; Belper, Derbyshire, DE56 4GS; England; 52.9857°N 1.4916°W

Information
- Type: Academy
- Motto: Integrity, Tenacity, Service
- Established: 1957
- Department for Education URN: 136505 Tables
- Ofsted: Reports
- Head teacher: James McNamara
- Gender: Mixed
- Age: 11 to 18
- Enrolment: 1402
- Colours: Burgundy, Blue
- Slogan: Integrity, Tenacity, Service
- Website: http://www.ecclesbourne.derbyshire.sch.uk/

The Ecclesbourne School is a secondary school with academy status situated in Duffield, Derbyshire, England.

== History ==
Since opening in 1957 as a small county school in the grounds of Duffield Hall, The Ecclesbourne School has had a varied organisational history. It became a co-educational 11 – 19 comprehensive school in 1976, grant maintained in 1990 and a Foundation School in 2001. Central Government recognised its excellence in 1999 by awarding ‘Beacon’ status. The School was successful in its bid to become part of the ‘Specialist School’ programme when it was awarded Technology College status in 2001. The school has been involved in a Leading Edge Partnership since 2003; at first in the South East Derbyshire Secondary Schools Improvement Partnership, but now is focused on collaborative work with John Flamsteed Community School. The school has been awarded the Careermark twice (2004 and 2008), the Sportsmark in 2004, and was one of only two schools in Derbyshire to receive the ‘Health Promoting Schools’ award.

In 2011 the school controversially became an academy which caused a two-day strike by some teachers.

Following an Ofsted Inspection in May 2022, the school was rated as Inadequate, after serious safeguarding issues were identified, along with an intimidatory culture of "homophobic, racist and misogynistic language". The school was previously rated as Outstanding following an inspection in 2008. The report notes that "Leaders have not ensured that the culture of safeguarding helps all pupils to feel safe". Whilst the quality of teaching was rated as Good, under the Behaviours and Attitudes category, the school was deemed to require improvement; and the leadership and management of the school was inadequate.

Since then, the school was inspected in September 2023, and was rated Good in all areas apart from Behaviour and Attitudes, which is rated as Requires Improvement. Overall, the school is rated as Good. The report notes that "Pupils now feel safe at this school. Many enjoy attending school. Pupils acknowledge that behaviour has improved. Many say the school is now much better". Despite this, the report highlights that "leaders have not engaged well enough with some pupils" to develop a more inclusive culture.

== GCSE and A level results ==
The Ecclesbourne School attained the highest GCSE results for the whole of Derbyshire for a non-private school. 91% of the students got at least 5 GCSEs at grades A*-C.

== Extracurricular activities ==
Student groups and activities include charity fund raising, choir, debating, drama, environmental teams, instrumental music ensembles, orchestra, mock trials, Duke of Edinburgh award and young enterprise.

Sports include athletics, basketball, cricket, dodgeball, cross-county, football, hockey, netball, rugby, squash. The Under-14 hockey team won the national title in 2004.

== Notable former pupils ==
- Nigel Hitchin, mathematician
- Stefan Buczacki, horticulturist and broadcaster
- Kate Pickett, co-author of The Spirit Level: Why More Equal Societies Almost Always Do Better
- Hollie Webb, Olympic gold medallist in women's hockey
- Daniel Trilling, journalist
- Tom Howell, cricketer
- Mel Reid, Professional golfer
- Liam Delap, Professional Footballer
