= Epimactis talantias =

Scientific classification
- Domain: Eukaryota
- Kingdom: Animalia
- Phylum: Arthropoda
- Class: Insecta
- Order: Lepidoptera
- Family: Lecithoceridae
- Genus: Epimactis
- Species: E. talantias

Binomial name
- Epimactis talantias Meyrick, 1908

Synonyms
- Archips citrinella Shiraki, 1913

Species of moth

Epimactis talantias is a moth in the family Lecithoceridae. It was described by Edward Meyrick in 1908. It is found in Sri Lanka and Taiwan.

The wingspan is 14–19 mm. The forewings are white, in males thinly and in females more closely irrorated (sprinkled) with fine fuscous or pale fuscous specks. The stigmata are black, the plical obliquely beyond the first discal. There is a row of black dots immediately before the margin around the apical portion of the costa and termen to the tornus. The hindwings are grey whitish, the apex slightly greyer.
