= Epimactis dissecta =

Scientific classification
- Domain: Eukaryota
- Kingdom: Animalia
- Phylum: Arthropoda
- Class: Insecta
- Order: Lepidoptera
- Family: Lecithoceridae
- Genus: Epimactis
- Species: E. dissecta

Binomial name
- Epimactis dissecta Meyrick, 1921

Species of moth

Epimactis dissecta is a moth in the family Lecithoceridae. It was described by Edward Meyrick in 1921. It is found on Java in Indonesia.

The wingspan is about 14 mm. The forewings are greyish ochreous with an attenuated white costal streak from the base to two-thirds and a fine white marginal line interrupted by black dots around the rest of the costa and termen. The hindwings are pale greyish.
