= Epimactis monodoxa =

Scientific classification
- Domain: Eukaryota
- Kingdom: Animalia
- Phylum: Arthropoda
- Class: Insecta
- Order: Lepidoptera
- Family: Lecithoceridae
- Genus: Epimactis
- Species: E. monodoxa

Binomial name
- Epimactis monodoxa Meyrick, 1907

Species of moth

Epimactis monodoxa is a moth in the family Lecithoceridae. It was described by Edward Meyrick in 1907. It is found in India.

The wingspan is 19–23 mm. The forewings are whitish ochreous, yellowish tinged, towards the dorsum slightly tinged with brownish. The discal stigmata are fuscous, the first minute, the second moderate and round. The hindwings are light grey in males and whitish ochreous in females.
