= Epimactis spasmodes =

Scientific classification
- Domain: Eukaryota
- Kingdom: Animalia
- Phylum: Arthropoda
- Class: Insecta
- Order: Lepidoptera
- Family: Lecithoceridae
- Genus: Epimactis
- Species: E. spasmodes

Binomial name
- Epimactis spasmodes Meyrick, 1914

Species of moth

Epimactis spasmodes is a moth in the family Lecithoceridae. It was described by Edward Meyrick in 1914. It is found in southern India.

The wingspan is about 21 mm. The forewings are whitish fuscous with the costal edge whitish ochreous and with a suffused dark fuscous wedge-shaped spot along the base of the dorsum. The stigmata are dark fuscous, the plical beyond the first discal. There is a fuscous shade from four-fifths of the costa to the dorsum before the tornus, angulated inwards to touch the second discal. A strongly outwards-curved series of cloudy dark-fuscous dots is found from beneath the costa at two-thirds to the dorsum before the tornus and there is also a series of cloudy dark-fuscous dots around the posterior part of the costa and termen. The hindwings are pale whitish grey ochreous.
