= Epimactis atropunctella =

Scientific classification
- Kingdom: Animalia
- Phylum: Arthropoda
- Clade: Pancrustacea
- Class: Insecta
- Order: Lepidoptera
- Family: Lecithoceridae
- Genus: Epimactis
- Species: E. atropunctella

Binomial name
- Epimactis atropunctella (Walsingham, 1881)

Synonyms
- Cryptolechia atropunctella Walsingham, 1881

Species of moth

Epimactis atropunctella is a moth in the family Lecithoceridae. It was described by Thomas de Grey, 6th Baron Walsingham, in 1881. It is found in Mozambique, South Africa (KwaZulu-Natal) and Zimbabwe.

The wingspan is about 15 mm. The forewings are white, the costa very narrowly tinged with straw-colour, especially towards the apex. There are two black discal spots before the middle, the upper one being the nearest to the base, a third black spot lying at the end of the cell. A row of three to five smaller black dots is found along the apical margin. The hindwings are rather shining whitish, with a very faint rosy greyish tinge.
