= World Conker Championships =

Annual conkers tournament in England

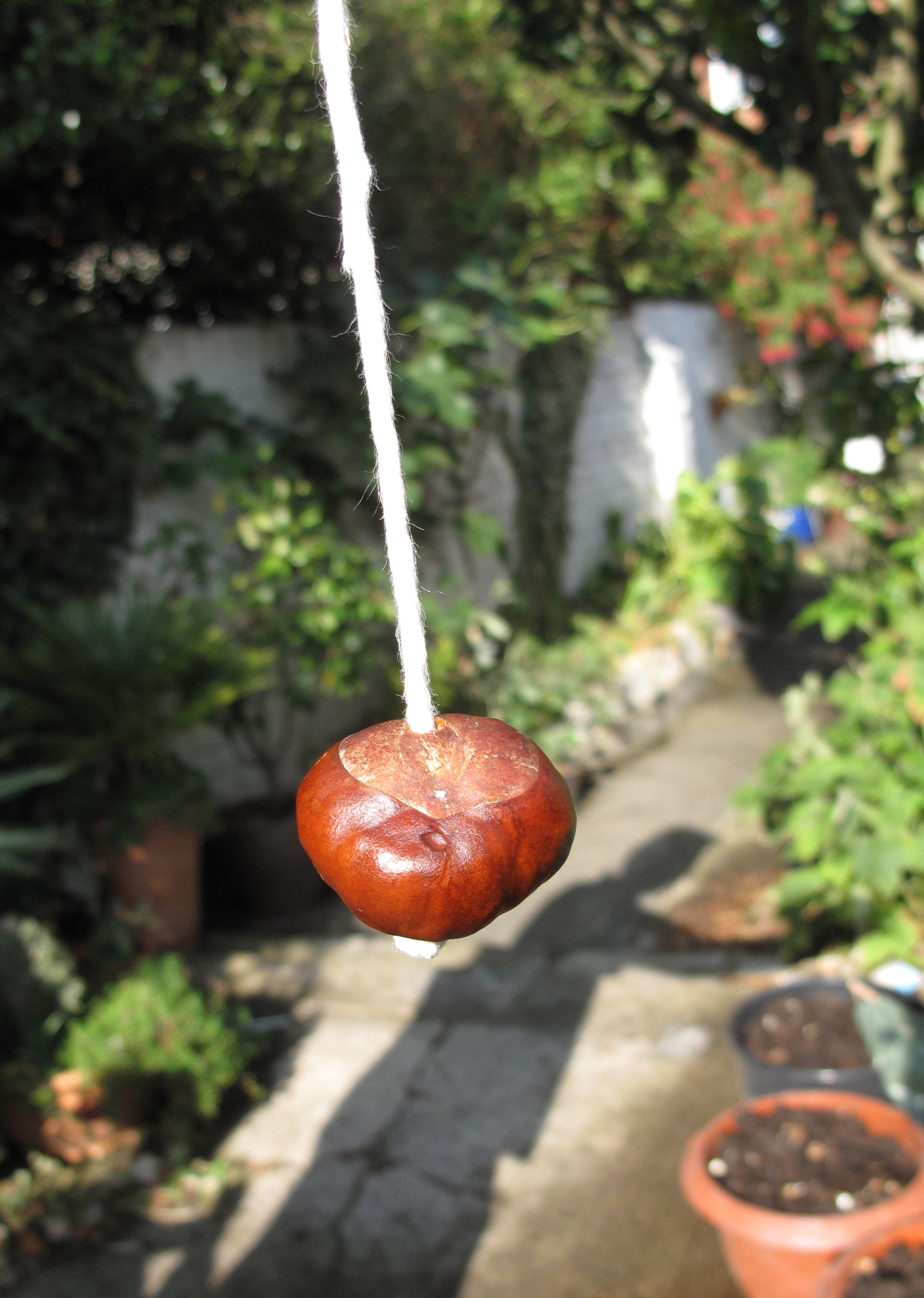
- World Conker Championships
- Highest governing body: Official website
- First played: 1965

Characteristics
- Contact: No
- Type: Pub games, Precision sports
- Equipment: Strung conker

The World Conker Championships (WCC) is a conkers tournament held annually on the second Sunday in October in the county of Northamptonshire, England. Two players use conkers threaded onto a string and take turns to strike the other's nut until it shatters. Players from around the world enter the tournament, competing in a knock-out format in both team and individual formats, with titles for men's, women's and youth categories. Up to 5,000 spectators watch around 400 players participating from many countries, including Australia, Austria, Canada, France, Japan, Mexico, New Zealand, Poland, Russia, South Africa, Sri Lanka, Ukraine, the United States and the United Kingdom.

== History ==
The World Conker Championships began in 1965 when a group of anglers in Ashton held a conker contest at the Chequered Skipper public house when the weather was too bad to go fishing. At the event, a small collection was made for charity, by someone who had a blind relative. Since then the event has raised over £420,000 for charities supporting the visually impaired. The event was held in Ashton for 45 years before moving to a larger venue at the Shuckburgh Arms in Southwick, Northamptonshire in 2009.

The tournament has been threatened with conker shortages over the years, in 1976 conkers used in the tournament had to be flown in from Jersey, in 1980 freak spring weather was one of the factors that threatened the World Conker Championships causing a conker shortage, and in 1982 a late frost killed off the horse chestnut blossom resulting in a failed conker harvest. In 2025 a shortage of conkers due to a hot and dry summer led to fears the event would be cancelled, but it went ahead following donations of conkers including from Windsor Castle.

On 6 October 2011, organisers were forced to cancel the event over safety fears with high winds being forecast. In 2012, the championships were cancelled again when a suitable venue couldn't be found in time.

Concerns for the future of the event were voiced over the horse-chestnut leaf miner moth, Cameraria ohridella, which has appeared in the region and could have a detrimental effect on the UK's horse chestnut population affecting conker yields.

On 9 October 2017, Chelsea Pensioner John Riley won the men's tournament at the age of 85, quite possibly making him the oldest world champion on the planet.

In 2022, Fee Aylmore won the women's event after 30 years of trying.

In 2024, allegations of cheating were levelled at the men's event winner David Jakins by men's runner-up Alastair Johnson-Ferguson, when a brown-painted fake steel conker was discovered in his pocket. Jakins was also one of the event's organisers, responsible for the handing out of chestnuts used by the competitors. He was cleared of any suspicion after a review of video evidence, by fellow organiser St John Burkett.

== WCC rules ==
Players' Rules of Engagement for the Noble Game of Conkers as follows:

1. Prior to the game, over 2,000 conkers (horse chestnuts) of the required 1.25-inch (30 mm) width are collected, drilled and strung ready by tournament officials. All conkers and laces are supplied by the World Conker Championships.
2. Conkers are drawn ‘blind’ from a bag, and players may reject up to three selected conkers.
3. Each game will commence with a toss of a coin, the winner of the toss may elect to strike or receive.
4. A distance of no less than 8" or 20 cm of lace must be between knuckle and nut.
5. Each player then takes three alternate strikes at the opponent's conker.
6. Each attempted strike must be clearly aimed at the nut, no deliberate miss hits.
7. The game will be decided once one of the conkers is smashed.
8. A small piece of nut or skin remaining (less than a third) shall be judged out, it must be enough to mount an attack.
9. If both nuts smash at the same time then the match shall be replayed.
10. Any nut being knocked from the lace but not smashing may be re threaded and the game continued.
11. A player causing a knotting of the laces (a snag) will be noted, three snags will lead to disqualification.
12. If a game lasts for more than five minutes then play will halt and the "5-minute rule" will come into effect. Each player will be allowed up to nine further strikes at their opponent's nut, again alternating three strikes each. If neither conker has been smashed at the end of the nine strikes then the player who strikes the nut the most times during this period will be judged the winner. If this is equal, then play continues, one strike each in turn, until one player hits and the other misses.

== Results history ==
All players are British except where indicated with a national flag icon.

Year	Mens Individual	Ladies Individual	Team Winner	Ladies Team	Junior (7–11)	Youth (11–15)	Young adult (16–18)
1965	Ron Marsh (1)	-	-	-	-	-	-
1966	Sid Walden	-	-	-	-	-	-
1967	L. Collins	-	-	-	-	-	-
1968	Tim Winham	-	-	-	-	-	-
1969	Peter Midlane (1)	-	-	-	-	-	-
1970	John M. Hillyard	-	-	-	-	-	-
1971	T. Dicks	-	-	-	-	-	-
1972	Ron Marsh (2)	-	-	-	-	-	-
1973	Peter Midlane (2)	-	-	-	Simon Bayliss	-	-
1974	J Marsh (1)	-	-	-	-	-	-
1975	J Marsh (2)	-	-	-	-	-	-
1976	Jorge Ramirez Carrillo (Mexico)	-	-	-	-	-	-
1977	C. Childs	-	-	-	-	-	-
1978	L. Treliving	-	-	-	-	-	-
1979	Charlie Bray (1)	-	-	-	-	-	-
1980	Keith Height	-	-	-	-	-	-
1981	Bill Cox (1)	-	-	-	-	-	-
1982	Jim Blackman	-	-	-	-	-	-
1983	S. Rowan	-	-	-	-	-	-
1984	R. Langer	-	-	-	-	-	-
1985	Peter Midlane (3)	-	-	-	-	-	-
1986	Charlie Bray (2)	-	-	-	Luke Bilson	Craig Belson	-
1987	John Hawes	-	-	-	-	Martin Nikel (1)	-
1988	W. Cox (2)	Sheila Doubleday (1)	-	-	-	Martin Nikel (2)	-
1989	P. Short	Christina Bateman	-	-	Andrew Donald Kerry	Lempriere	
1990	Harold Watson	Mary Bedford	-	-	Andrew Donald Kerry	Faye Elliott	
1991	John Bull (1)	Pauline Baker	-	-	Andrew Donald Kerry	Lisa Crews	_
1992	P. Canning	J. Courtney	Chequered Skipper 'B' Team (1)	-	-	M. Hutcheson	
1993	M. Tindall	Sheila Doubleday (2)	Chequered Skipper 'B' Team (2)	-	M. Heatherington	R. Rawcliffe	-
1994	James Marsh	Tina Stone (1)	The Crocodile	-	Daniel Jack	James Nikel (1)	-
1995	Brian Jackson	Judi Rabbit	The Brigstock International Quartet	The Wilpave Swingers	Tim Maguire	James Gould	-
1996	John Bull (2)	Karen Morgan	Sebright Arms (1)	Nutcracker Suite	Richard Fuller	James Nikel (2)	Ian Smith
1997	Paul Vjestica	Louise Bunker	Nelson Nutcrackers	The Minge Petals (1)	Graham Clark	Diane Allen	-
1998	Helmut Kern (Germany)	Lesley Bullock	Nauort 2 (Germany)	Sebright Arms (2)	Matthew Storrow	Jonathon Lyan	Ashley Thomas
1999	Jody Tracey	Margaret Twiddy	Absolutely Hammered	Wilpave Sweeties	Charlotte Laskey	Jack Jarvis	Chris Eccles
2000	Mark Tracey	Selma Becker (Austria)	Barton Seagrave Bashers	The Minge Petals (2)	Rachel Mintern	Sally Rate	Tim Linnell
2001	Neil Fraser	Celine Parachou (France)	Royal Oak Resistance	France Fillies (1)	Duncan Winfrey	Max Aitken	Lewis Chilvers
2002	Richard Swailes	Liz Gibson	Elton Wasps	Castle Green Conkerers	Ruth Pritchard	Joseph Emery	-
2003	Brian Stewart	Debbie Oates	No Strings Attached	Magnificent 7 Minus 3 (1)	Kieran Campbell	William Pritchard (1)	Lucy Walshaw
2004	Darren Foster	Alison Everett	Daniel Lambert Dining Club	Les Filles Francais (2) (France)	Kieran O'Connor	Jordan Witherall	James Robinson
2005	Alex Callan	Jayne Coddington	Peterborough Nutters (1)	Magnificent 7 Minus 3 (2)	Callum Owen	William Pritchard (2)	Kallom Nash
2006	Chris Jones	Sandy Gardner	Celtic Conkerors	France (3)	Philip Broomhead (1)	Jack Boon	Emma Ratcliffe
2007	Ady Hurrell (1)	Tina Stone (2)	Royal Haskoning Rest of the World	Magnificent 7 Minus 3 (3)	Philip Broomhead (2)	Nicolas Rothera	Steven Wray
2008	Ray Kellock (1)	Amy Farrow (1)	Rushden Reprobates	France (4)	Thomas Whincup	Robert Winfield	Rebecca Moss
2009	Thomas Gormley	Sue Howes	Peterborough Nutters (2)	-	Evie Driscoll-King	Oliver Mas	Brent Walker
2010	Ray Kellock (2)	Wendy Bradford	The Fairways	Sri Lankan Ladies (Sri Lanka)	Louis Carpenter	Samuel Lewin	Robyn Geldard
2011	Event Cancelled (Bad weather)						
2012	Event Cancelled (No venue)						
2013	Simon Cullum	Sophie Knox	Woodbeeez (1)	-	Harrison Scott	Oliver Simons (1)	Georgie Spence-Jones
2014	John Doyle	Stephanie Withall	Woodbeeez (2)	-	Elliott Hurrell	Daniel Devaney	Alex Wallman
2015	Steven Prescott	Amy Farrow (2)	Woodbeeez (3)	-	Peter Rogers	Isla Watson	Charlie Dathorne
2016	Tom Dryden	Lorna Clarke	Lord Robartes Nutters	-	William Chapman	Josh Broomhead	Oliver Simons (2)
2017	John Riley	Julie Freeman	Mutts Nutts	-	Benjamin Wallace	Faith Weatherington	Oliver Simons (3)
2018	Edward Gaze	Karen Holloway	Oakley’s Nuts (1)	-	Seth Wiltshire (1)	Matthew Farrow	Freya Griffith-Thompson
Year	Mens Individual	Ladies Individual	Team Winner		Junior (7–11)	Intermediate (12–16)	
2019	Andy Moore	Jasmine Tetley (1)	Oakley’s Nuts (2)	-	Leon Brown	Seth Wiltshire (2)	-
2020	Event Cancelled (COVID-19 pandemic)						
2021	Ady Hurrell (2)	Jasmine Tetley (2)	We Came, We Saw, Jasmine Conkered (1)	-	Riley Martin (1)	Brandon King & Seth Wiltshire (3) (Tied)	-
2022	Randy Topolnitsky (Canada)	Fee Aylmore	The Britcans	-	Oliver Price	Riley Martin (2) & George Holton (Tied)	-
2023	Mark Hunter	Jasmine Tetley (3)	We Came, We Saw, Jasmine Conkered (2)	-	Dominic Christou	Alex Duckham	-
2024	David Jakins	Kelci Banschbach (United States)	The Skuumkoppers (Netherlands)	-	Sebastian Sheffield	Enija Butane & Clara Axmacher (Tied)	-
2025	Matt Cross	Mags Blake	The Conker Cowboys	-	Nicoda Hutchinson	Felix Axmacher	-

== WCC roll of honour ==
Shown in alphabetical order by surname in the event of a tie.

Individual Champion	Wins
Peter Midlane	3
Oliver Simons	3
Jasmine Tetley	3
Charlie Bray	2
Philip Broomhead	2
John Bull	2
Bill Cox	2
Sheila Doubleday	2
Amy Farrow	2
Ady Hurrell	2
Ray Kellock	2
J Marsh	2
Ron Marsh	2
James Nikel	2
Martin Nikel	2
William Pritchard	2
Tina Stone	2

Team Champion	Wins
France Fillies, Les Filles Francais, France	4
Magnificent 7 Minus 3	3
Woodbeeez	3
Chequered Skipper 'B' Team	2
The Minge Petals	2
Oakley’s Nuts	2
Peterborough Nutters	2
Sebright Arms	2
We Came, We Saw, Jasmine Conkered	2

Junior, Intermediate, and Young Adult Champion	Wins
Oliver Simons	3
Seth Wiltshire	3
Philip Broomhead	2
Riley Martin	2
James Nikel	2
Martin Nikel	2
William Pritchard	2

Note: The young adult category of the competition was discontinued after 2018. All young adults aged 16 and over are now eligible to compete in the adult championships (with consent from a parent/guardian).

== Video history from 1970 to 2024 ==
- Scandal rocks The 2024 World Conker Championships as winner accused of 'cheating' (Britclip)
- 2021 World Conker Championship courtesy of Britclip
- 2017 World Conker Championship by thevideoclipplace on YouTube
- 2016 World Conker Championship by BBC Northampton on YouTube
- 2015 World Conker Championship by Trans World Sport on YouTube
- 2014 World Conker Championship courtesy of YouTube
- 2010 World Conker Championship by Ben Moseby
- 1974 World Conker Championship by ITV on YouTube
- Conker World Champion Peter Midlane appears on Blue Peter (BBC) 1970
