= Epimactis =

Scientific classification
- Kingdom: Animalia
- Phylum: Arthropoda
- Class: Insecta
- Order: Lepidoptera
- Family: Lecithoceridae
- Genus: Epimactis; Meyrick, 1907

Genus of moths

Epimactis is a genus of moths in the family Lecithoceridae.

== Species ==
- Epimactis albipunctella Viette, 1968
- Epimactis atropunctella (Walsingham, 1881)
- Epimactis crambalea Meyrick, 1910
- Epimactis crocella Viette, 1956
- Epimactis dissecta Meyrick, 1921
- Epimactis icterina Meyrick, 1931
- Epimactis incertella Viette, 1956
- Epimactis infulata Meyrick, 1914
- Epimactis melithorax Meyrick, 1923
- Epimactis metazona Meyrick, 1908
- Epimactis monodoxa Meyrick, 1907
- Epimactis nigricella Viette, 1968
- Epimactis ochreocapitella Viette, 1968
- Epimactis pulsatella Bradley, 1961
- Epimactis spasmodes Meyrick, 1914
- Epimactis strombodes Meyrick, 1914
- Epimactis suffusella (Walker, 1864)
- Epimactis talantias Meyrick, 1908
- Epimactis tortricella Viette, 1968
- Epimactis turbida Meyrick, 1914
