= Epimactis icterina =

Scientific classification
- Domain: Eukaryota
- Kingdom: Animalia
- Phylum: Arthropoda
- Class: Insecta
- Order: Lepidoptera
- Family: Lecithoceridae
- Genus: Epimactis
- Species: E. icterina

Binomial name
- Epimactis icterina Meyrick, 1931

Species of moth

Epimactis icterina is a moth in the family Lecithoceridae. It was described by Edward Meyrick in 1931. It is found in northern Vietnam.
