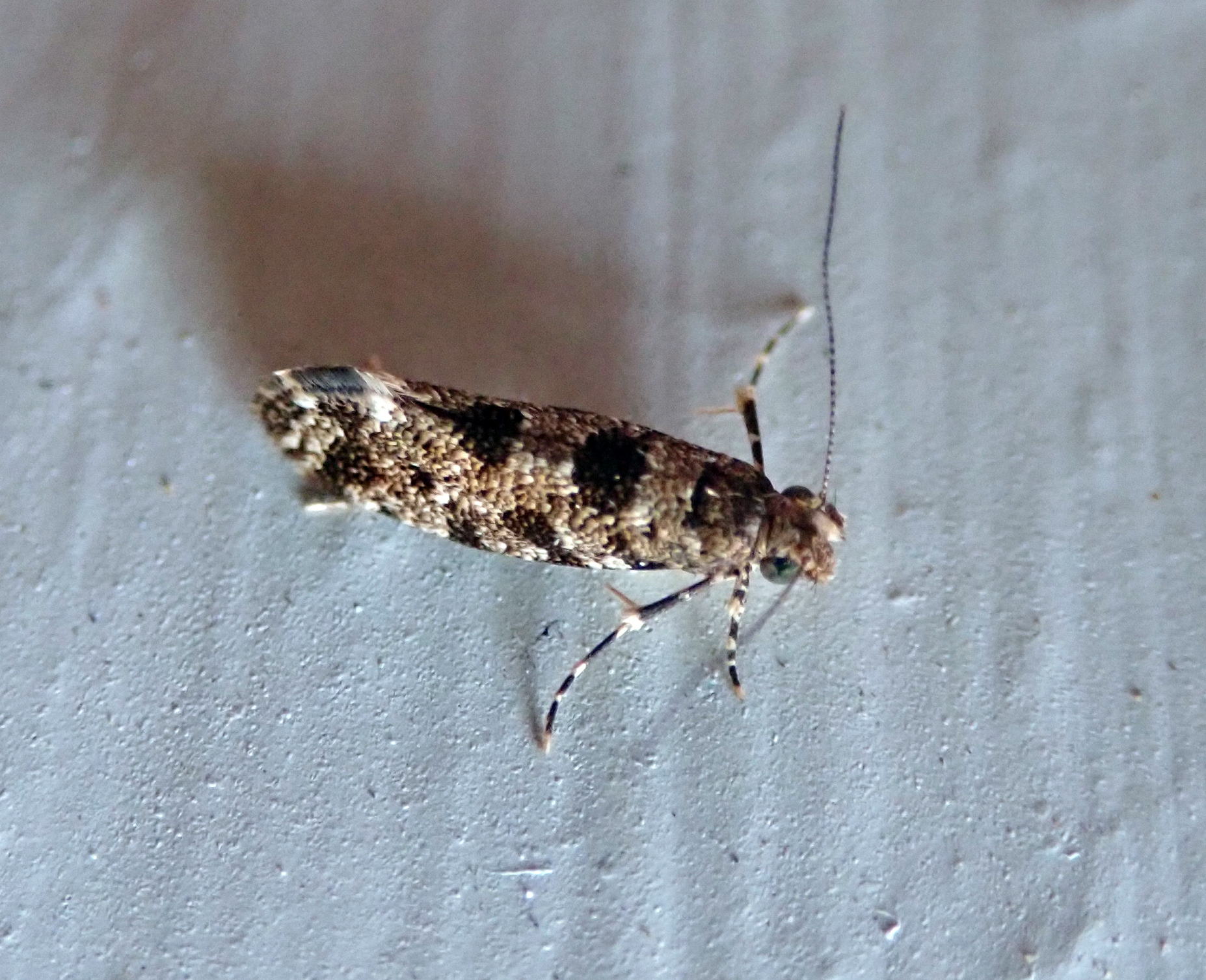

Scientific classification
- Kingdom: Animalia
- Phylum: Arthropoda
- Clade: Pancrustacea
- Class: Insecta
- Order: Lepidoptera
- Family: Tineidae
- Subfamily: Hapsiferinae
- Genus: Parochmastis; Meyrick, 1917

Synonyms
- Eretmobela A.J. Turner, 1918; Eunorfolkia J.D. Holloway, 1977; Norfolkia Bradley, 1956

= Parochmastis =

Genus of moths

Parochmastis is a genus of moths belonging to the family Tineidae from New Zealand and Australia

== Species ==
- Parochmastis dromaea (Turner, 1926)
- Parochmastis hilderi (Bradley, 1956)
- Parochmastis phaeosema (Turner, 1918)
- Parochmastis styracodes Meyrick, 1917
