= Epimactis strombodes =

Scientific classification
- Domain: Eukaryota
- Kingdom: Animalia
- Phylum: Arthropoda
- Class: Insecta
- Order: Lepidoptera
- Family: Lecithoceridae
- Genus: Epimactis
- Species: E. strombodes

Binomial name
- Epimactis strombodes Meyrick, 1914

Species of moth

Epimactis strombodes is a moth in the family Lecithoceridae. It was described by Edward Meyrick in 1914. It is found in Sri Lanka.

The wingspan is about 17 mm for males and 24 mm for females. The forewings are whitish yellow and the hindwings are yellow whitish.
