= British Tortricoid Moths =

First editions

British Tortricoid Moths is a two-volume publication by John David Bradley, W. G. Tremewan and Arthur Smith, published by the Ray Society. It is the standard work on the tortricoid moths of Britain.

Volume 1 (ISBN 0-903874-01-6), viii + 251 pages, with a green dustjacket, published in 1973, covered the Cochylinae and the Tortricinae.

Volume 2 (ISBN 0-903874-06-7), viii + 336 pages, with a blue dustjacket, published in 1979, covered the Olethreutinae.

The two volumes include colour plates, containing painted illustrations of set specimens by Brian Hargreaves of the species covered.

The work was reproduced in CD format by Pisces publications in 2004.
