= Epimactis crocella =

Scientific classification
- Kingdom: Animalia
- Phylum: Arthropoda
- Class: Insecta
- Order: Lepidoptera
- Family: Lecithoceridae
- Genus: Epimactis
- Species: E. crocella

Binomial name
- Epimactis crocella Viette, 1956

Species of moth

Epimactis crocella is a moth in the family Lecithoceridae. It was described by Viette in 1956. It is found in Madagascar.
