= Ashton Wold =

Site of Special Scientific Interest in Northamptonshire, England, UK

Coordinates: 52.475°N 0.394°W

- Site of Special Scientific Interest
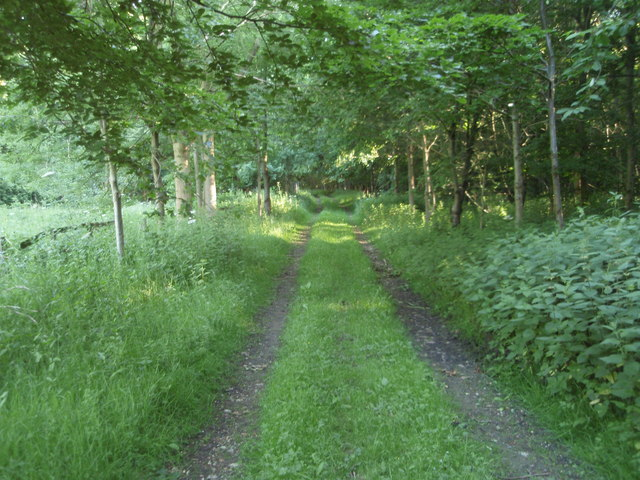
- Location of Ashton Wold.
- Area of search: Northamptonshire
- Grid reference: TL 091 875
- Interest: Biological
- Area: 54.0 hectares
- Notification date: 1990
- Location map: Magic Map

Ashton Wold is a 54.0-hectare (133-acre) biological Site of Special Scientific Interest (SSSI) east of the market town Oundle in Northamptonshire.

== History ==
It is part of the Ashton Estate, which was purchased in 1860 by Lionel de Rothschild, a banker and politician. His grandson, Charles Rothschild, the founder of the Society for the Promotion of Nature Reserves, now The Wildlife Trusts, managed the Ashton Wold estate to maximise its suitability for wildlife, especially butterflies. He built Ashton Wold House, which was designed by William Huckvale. The house and its garden are listed on the Register of Historic Parks and Gardens by English Heritage for their historic interest, and part of the garden is woodland which is designated as Ashton Wold SSSI.

Part of the estate is the subject of a restrictive covenant between Charles's daughter Miriam Rothschild and the National Trust in 1945. Following Charles death in 1923 his wife, Rózsika and their daughter Miriam Rothschild inherited the estate. Miriam pressed the UK Government to allow more German Jews as refugees from Nazi Germany and set up housing for 49 Jewish children. During World War II Ashton Wold estate served as a hospital for wounded military personnel, including Miriam's future husband, Captain George Lane. It also provided accommodation blocks in the Ashton Wold woods for the Royal Air Force and the American Eighth Air Force billeted at nearby RAF Polebrook.

The Ashton Estate comprises residential properties, holiday accommodation, agricultural land and a working farm. The current host of The Lady Rothschild Holiday Houses is Charles Daniel Lane, a molecular biologist who along with colleagues Gerard Marbaix and John Gurdon discovered the oocyte exogenous mRNA expression system.

== Ecology ==
The SSSI is ancient secondary woodland with mature oak, ash and birch trees. The thick shrub layer includes hawthorn and buckthorn. There are breeding birds such as woodcocks and hawfinches.

== Access ==
There is access from Lutton Road.
