= Epimactis turbida =

Scientific classification
- Domain: Eukaryota
- Kingdom: Animalia
- Phylum: Arthropoda
- Class: Insecta
- Order: Lepidoptera
- Family: Lecithoceridae
- Genus: Epimactis
- Species: E. turbida

Binomial name
- Epimactis turbida Meyrick, 1914

Species of moth

Epimactis turbida is a moth in the family Lecithoceridae. It was described by Edward Meyrick in 1914. It is found in Assam, India.

The wingspan is 14–18 mm. The forewings are light fuscous with the costal edge ochreous whitish and the dorsal area towards the base suffused with rather dark purplish fuscous. The stigmata are dark fuscous, the plical small, slightly beyond the first discal, the second discal rather large, connected with the dorsum by dark-purplish-fuscous suffusion, the terminal area beyond this more or less darker suffused. There are some undefined cloudy-dark-fuscous spots around the posterior part of the costa and termen. The hindwings are pale grey or whitish grey.
