= Ethmia phricotypa =

Scientific classification
- Kingdom: Animalia
- Phylum: Arthropoda
- Clade: Pancrustacea
- Class: Insecta
- Order: Lepidoptera
- Family: Depressariidae
- Genus: Ethmia
- Species: E. phricotypa

Binomial name
- Ethmia phricotypa Bradley, 1965

Species of moth

Ethmia phricotypa is a moth in the family Depressariidae described by John David Bradley in 1965. It is found in Uganda.
