= Epimactis ochreocapitella =

Scientific classification
- Kingdom: Animalia
- Phylum: Arthropoda
- Class: Insecta
- Order: Lepidoptera
- Family: Lecithoceridae
- Genus: Epimactis
- Species: E. ochreocapitella

Binomial name
- Epimactis ochreocapitella Viette, 1968

Species of moth

Epimactis ochreocapitella is a moth in the family Lecithoceridae. It was described by Viette in 1968. It is found in Madagascar.
