= Epimactis infulata =

Scientific classification
- Domain: Eukaryota
- Kingdom: Animalia
- Phylum: Arthropoda
- Class: Insecta
- Order: Lepidoptera
- Family: Lecithoceridae
- Genus: Epimactis
- Species: E. infulata

Binomial name
- Epimactis infulata Meyrick, 1914

Species of moth

Epimactis infulata is a moth in the family Lecithoceridae. It was described by Edward Meyrick in 1914. It is found in Sri Lanka.

The wingspan is about 14 mm. The forewings are brownish grey with the costal edge white, the costa towards the base more broadly suffused with whitish. The stigmata are dark fuscous, the plical rather obliquely beyond the first discal, the second discal connected with dorsum by a direct dark-fuscous rather irregular streak. There are three blackish linear marks on the posterior part of the costa, and a black line around the apex and termen. The hindwings are light grey.
