= Tom Howell (cricketer) =

English cricketer

Personal information
- Full name: Thomas Henry Howell
- Born: 4 September 1987 (age 39); Derby, Derbyshire, England
- Height: 6 ft 1 in (1.85 m)
- Batting: Right-handed
- Bowling: Leg break

Domestic team information
- Years: Team
- 2007–2008: Oxford University

Career statistics
Competition	First-class
Matches	2
Runs scored	123
Batting average	30.75
100s/50s	–/1
Top score	82
Balls bowled	108
Wickets	5
Bowling average	16.00
5 wickets in innings	–
10 wickets in match	–
Best bowling	3/52
Catches/stumpings	–/–
- Source: Cricinfo, 3 March 2020

Thomas Henry Howell (born 14 September 1987) is an English former first-class cricketer.

Howell was born at Derby in September 1987. He was educated at The Ecclesbourne School, before going up to New College, Oxford. While studying at Oxford, he made two appearances in first-class cricket for Oxford University against Cambridge University in The University Matches of 2007 and 2008. In the 2007 match, he scored 82 runs opening the batting for Oxford.
