= Epimactis suffusella =

Scientific classification
- Kingdom: Animalia
- Phylum: Arthropoda
- Class: Insecta
- Order: Lepidoptera
- Family: Lecithoceridae
- Genus: Epimactis
- Species: E. suffusella

Binomial name
- Epimactis suffusella (Walker, 1864)

Synonyms
- Cryptolechia suffusella Walker, 1864

Species of moth

Epimactis suffusella is a moth in the family Lecithoceridae. It was described by Francis Walker in 1864. It is found on Borneo.

Adults are straw coloured, the forewings slightly rounded at the tips and the costa and exterior border mostly fawn colour. There is a diffuse fawn-coloured discal patch. The exterior border is slightly convex and oblique.
