= Stefan Buczacki =

British horticulturist

- Born: 16 October 1945 (age 80)
- Occupations: Horticulturist; botanist; biographer; broadcaster

Stefan T. Buczacki (born 16 October 1945) is a British horticulturist, botanist, biographer, novelist and broadcaster.

== Early life ==
Buczacki grew up in Duffield, Derbyshire, where he was educated at The Ecclesbourne School. He gained a first-class honours degree in botany at Southampton University, and a DPhil degree in forest science at Linacre College, Oxford.

== Career ==
Buczacki started a career in research for the Agricultural Research Council at the National Vegetable Research Station at Wellesbourne, Warwickshire. As a plant pathologist he worked on the biology and control of a species of Phytomyxea, Plasmodiophora brassicae, the cause of clubroot disease. He became a freelance author and broadcaster in 1984. He lives in Stratford-upon-Avon.

His broadcasting work included twelve years as a panel member and then chairman of Gardeners' Question Time on BBC Radio 4, contributing to more than six hundred consecutive editions. He devised and presented The Gardening Quiz on BBC Radio 4 and Classic Gardening Forum on Classic FM. He has appeared frequently on British television (all five terrestrial channels), including Gardeners' World on BBC2 and a number of series on satellite and regional stations. He was also the resident gardening expert on Channel 5's daytime show Open House with Gloria Hunniford and on BBC1's daytime show Good Morning with Anne and Nick from 1992 to 1996.

Buczacki is credited as Britain's second-biggest-selling gardening author, with more than 60 books to his name on both gardening and natural history. His first book, Collins Guide to the Pests, Diseases and Disorders of Garden Plants, written jointly with Dr Keith Harris and illustrated by Brian Hargreaves, has remained the standard reference work for forty years, while his Fauna Britannica was an account of the entire wild animal life of the British Isles for which the then Prince of Wales (now King Charles III) wrote the foreword. He also wrote Volume 102 of Garden Natural History for Collins's New Naturalist series. He has written for a number of national newspapers and magazines.

Buczacki has been an outspoken critic of makeover gardening programmes on television, arguing that it is more important to show people how to garden than to pretend to do it for them.

== Awards and distinctions ==
Buczacki is a Fellow of the Royal Society of Biology, a Chartered Biologist, a founder Fellow of the Chartered Institute of Horticulture, a Fellow of the Linnean Society of London, Associate of the Royal Photographic Society, and Honorary Professor of Plant Pathology at Liverpool John Moores University. He holds the Veitch Memorial Medal in gold of the Royal Horticultural Society.

Buczacki is an authority on fungi and double past-President of the British Mycological Society, and was awarded the Society's Benefactor's Medal. He was presented with the Garden Media Guild Lifetime Achievement Award in 2013. In 2012 he published Collins' Fungi Guide, the most comprehensive single volume illustrated field guide to British fungi ever written with around 2,500 species.

He is a Fellow of CAB International, holds honorary doctorates from the University of Southampton and the University of Derby and in 2007 was installed as the first Honorary Fellow of Pershore College shortly before its merger with Warwickshire College.

He also has an interest in modern British political history and is recognised internationally as an authority on Winston Churchill and his house at Chartwell, described in his book Churchill and Chartwell. In 2016, he published My darling Mr Asquith, a biography of the Hon Venetia Stanley, intimate confidante of prime minister H. H. Asquith.

In 2020, Buczacki published his first novel, The Marmalade Pot, the story of a young woman's search for her own sexuality, described by Fern Britton as 'intriguing and satisfying'.

== Personal life ==
Buczacki is married to Beverley, a retired school principal, with whom he has two children: Simon, the Richard Blackwell Pharsalia Professor of Colorectal Surgery at the University of Oxford, and Julian, a Major-General in the British Army.
