= Epimactis melithorax =

Scientific classification
- Domain: Eukaryota
- Kingdom: Animalia
- Phylum: Arthropoda
- Class: Insecta
- Order: Lepidoptera
- Family: Lecithoceridae
- Genus: Epimactis
- Species: E. melithorax

Binomial name
- Epimactis melithorax Meyrick, 1923

Species of moth

Epimactis melithorax is a moth in the family Lecithoceridae. It was described by Edward Meyrick in 1923. It is found in north-western India.

The wingspan is about 22 mm. The forewings are fuscous, with a faint purple tinge and with the costal edge yellow-ochreous. The hindwings are dark grey.
