= Miriam Rothschild =

British natural scientist and author

The Honourable Dame Miriam Rothschild DBE FRS
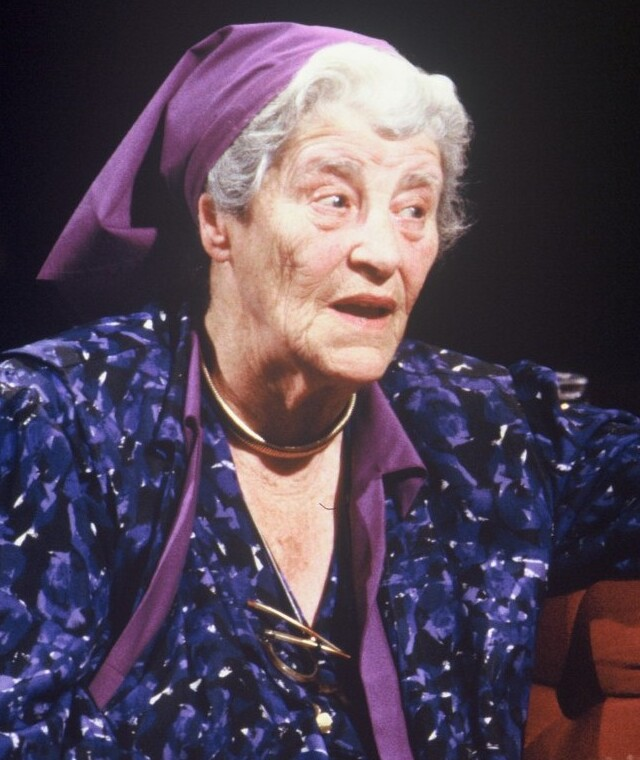
- Rotschild on the programme After Dark in 1988
- Born: Miriam Louisa Rothschild; 5 August 1908; Ashton, Northamptonshire, England
- Died: 20 January 2005 (aged 96); Oundle, Northamptonshire, England
- Education: Chelsea College of Science and Technology, Bedford College, London
- Known for: Research on fleas
- Spouse: George Lane (m. 1943; div. 1957)
- Children: 6, including Charles Daniel Lane
- Parents: Charles Rothschild (father); Rózsika Edle Rothschild (née von Wertheimstein) (mother)
- Relatives: Victor Rothschild (brother), Pannonica de Koenigswarter (sister), Lionel Walter Rothschild (uncle)
- Awards: H. H. Bloomer Award (1968)
- Scientific career
- Fields: Entomology, botany
- Workplaces: Tertiary education: Chelsea Polytechnic (zoology)

Dame Miriam Louisa Rothschild DBE FRS (5 August 1908 – 20 January 2005) was a British natural scientist and author with contributions to zoology, entomology, and botany.

== Early life ==
Miriam Rothschild was born in 1908 in Ashton Wold, near Oundle in Northamptonshire, the daughter of Charles Rothschild of the Rothschild banking family of England of Jewish bankers and Rózsika Edle Rothschild (née von Wertheimstein), a Hungarian sportswoman, of Austrian-Jewish descent. Her brother was Victor Rothschild, 3rd Baron Rothschild and one of her sisters (Kathleen Annie) Pannonica Rothschild (Baroness Nica de Koenigswarter) would later be a bebop jazz enthusiast and patroness of Thelonious Monk and Charlie Parker.

Her father had described about 500 new species of flea, and her uncle Lionel Walter Rothschild had built a private natural history museum at Tring. By the age of four she had started collecting ladybird beetles and caterpillars and taking a tame quail to bed with her. World War I broke on the eve of Miriam's sixth birthday in 1914, while the Rothschilds were holidaying in Austro-Hungary. They hurried home on the first westward train but, unable to pay, had to borrow money from a Hungarian passenger who commented "This is the proudest moment of my life. Never did I think that I should be asked to lend money to a Rothschild!" Her father took his own life when she was 15, after which she became closer to her uncle. She was educated at home until the age of 17, when she demanded to go to school. She thence attended evening classes in zoology at Chelsea College of Science and Technology and classes during the day in literature at Bedford College, London.

== Personal life ==
During World War II, Rothschild was recruited to work at Bletchley Park on codebreaking with Alan Turing and was awarded a Defence Medal by the British government for her efforts. Additionally, she pressed the UK Government to admit more German Jews as refugees from Nazi Germany. She arranged housing for 49 Jewish children, some of whom stayed at her home at Ashton Wold. The estate also served as a hospital for wounded military personnel, including her future husband, Captain George Lane. Lane, a Hungarian-born British soldier, had changed his name from Lanyi in case of enemy capture. They had six children, four biological: Mary Rozsiska (1945–2010), Charles Daniel (born 1948), Charlotte Teresa (born 1951) and Johanna Miriam (born 1951); and two adopted. The marriage was dissolved in 1957 but the pair remained on good terms.

Rothschild was a vegetarian and had a close connection to her pets and wild animals that she befriended. Rothschild supported many social causes including animal welfare, free milk for children in schools, and gay rights by contributing to the Wolfenden Report which resulted in decriminalising "homosexual behaviour between consenting adults in private".

== Research ==
During the 1930s Rothschild made a name for herself at the Marine Biological Station in Plymouth, studying the mollusc Nucula and its trematode parasites (Rothschild 1936, 1938a, 1938b).

Rothschild was a leading authority on fleas. She was the first person to work out the flea's jumping mechanism. She also studied the flea's reproductive cycle and linked this, in rabbits, to the hormonal changes within the host. Her New Naturalist book on parasitism (Fleas, Flukes and Cuckoos) was a huge success. Its title can be explained as: external parasites (e.g. fleas), internal parasites (e.g. flukes) and others (the cuckoo is a 'brood parasite'). Along with Professor G. Harris, Rothschild determined that myxomatosis, a virus affecting tapeti and brush rabbits, was spread by fleas, not mosquitoes as previously understood. The Rothschild Collection of Fleas (founded by Charles Rothschild) is now part of the Natural History Museum collection and her six-volume catalogue of the collection (in collaboration with G. H. E. Hopkins and illustrated by Arthur Smith) took thirty years to complete.

In addition to her work on fleas and other parasites, Rothschild studied insects in the order Lepidoptera. Specifically, she was interested in chemical ecology and mimicry. To learn more about mimicry and its role in Lepidopteran predation by birds, Rothschild adapted greenhouses on her Ashton Wold estate to serve as aviaries for owls and other potential predators. This led to further work to identify the compounds synthesized by insects such as Burnet moth and collaboration with Tadeusz Reichstein to show that a monarch butterfly's toxicity comes from milkweed, its larval host plant. It also resulted in work to demonstrate the importance of plant-derived carotenoids in insect coloration. Rothschild discovered that Large white cabbage butterfly caterpillars fed a diet without carotenoids did not match their background as they typically would and Monarch butterfly caterpillars' pupae had silver threads instead of gold.

Another area of Lepidoptera research that Rothschild pursued was that of the production of antibiotics by butterflies. This work was initially inspired by observations Rothschild made during an anthrax outbreak in the 1930s, but did not begin in earnest until around 60 years later. Rothschild drafted a manuscript on the subject and the results were eventually published 12 years after her death.

Rothschild was a member of the Oxford genetics school during the 1960s, where she met the ecological geneticist E.B. Ford.

Rothschild authored books about her father (Rothschild's Reserves – time and fragile nature) and her uncle (Dear Lord Rothschild). She wrote about 350 papers on entomology, zoology and other subjects.

Later in her career, Rothschild grew interested in hay meadow restoration. In response to a comment that it would take 1,000 years to reproduce a medieval meadow, she said "I could make a very good imitation in ten...it took me fifteen." She developed multiple seed mixes on her Ashton Wold estate, including one she called "Farmer's Nightmare". Another seed mix was used by Prince Charles, Prince of Wales, on his Highgrove Estate.

== Awards/honours ==
In 1973. Rothschild was elected a Foreign Honorary Member of the American Academy of Arts and Sciences. She received honorary doctorates from eight universities, including Oxford and Cambridge, and was an Honorary Fellow of St Hugh's College, Oxford. She gave the Romanes Lecture for 1984–5 in Oxford. Rothschild was elected a Fellow of the Royal Society in 1985 and was granted the title of Dame Commander of the British Empire in 2000, having been appointed a Commander of the Order (CBE) in the 1982 Birthday Honours.

Rothschild was a pioneer among women in entomology and became the first woman trustee of the Natural History Museum (1967–1975), the first woman president of Royal Entomological Society (1993–1994), the first woman to serve on the Committee for Conservation of the National Trust, and the first woman member of the eight-member Entomological Club.

In 1986 the John Galway Foster Human Rights Trust was established; in 2006 the name of the trust was expanded to The Miriam Rothschild & John Foster Human Rights Trust. This funds an annual lecture on human rights. She is also honoured by the endowed Professorship in Conservation Biology in her name at University of Cambridge.

== Philanthropy ==
Rothschild founded the 'Schizophrenia Research Fund' in 1962, in honour of her sister Liberty after Liberty was diagnosed and hospitalized with schizophrenia. The Schizophrenia Research Fund is an independent registered charity formed "to advance the better understanding, prevention, treatment and cure of all forms of mental illness and in particular of the illness known as Schizophrenia". In March 2006, following Miriam's death, the name of the Fund was changed in her memory to the 'Miriam Rothschild Schizophrenia Research Fund'.

The pioneer of British art therapy, Edward Adamson and his partner and collaborator, John Timlin, were regular visitors to Ashton Wold. Between 1983 and 1997, the influential Adamson Collection of 6,000 paintings, drawings, sculptures and ceramics by people living with major mental disorder at Netherne Hospital, created with Adamson's encouragement in his progressive art studios at the hospital, was housed and displayed to the public in a medieval barn at Ashton. Rothschild was both a Trustee and, subsequently, Patron of the Adamson Collection Trust. The Adamson Collection is now almost all re-located to the Wellcome Library. All Adamson's papers, correspondence, photographs and other material are currently being organised as the 'Edward Adamson Archive', also at the Wellcome Library.

== Selected works ==
=== Books ===
- Rothschild, Miriam and Clay, Theresa (1953) Fleas, Flukes and Cuckoos: a study of bird parasites. The New Naturalist series. London: Collins
- Hopkins, G. H. E. and Rothschild, Miriam (1953–81) An Illustrated Catalogue to the Rothschild Collection of Fleas 6 volumes (4to.) London: British Museum (Natural History)
- Rothschild, Miriam (1983) Dear Lord Rothschild: birds, butterflies and history. London: Hutchinson (ISBN 0-86689-019-X)
- Rothschild, Miriam and Farrell, Clive (1985) The Butterfly Gardener. London: Michael Joseph
- Rothschild, Miriam (1986) Animals and Man: the Romanes lecture for 1984–5 delivered in Oxford on 5 February 1985. Oxford: Clarendon Press
- Rothschild, Miriam et al. (1986) Colour Atlas of Insect Tissues via the Flea. London: Wolfe
- Rothschild, Miriam (1991) Butterfly Cooing Like a Dove. London: Doubleday
- Stebbing-Allen, George; Woodcock, Martin; Lings, Stephen and Rothschild, Miriam (1994) A Diversity of Birds: a personal voyage of discovery. London: Headstart (ISBN 1-85944-000-2)
- Rothschild, Miriam and Marren, Peter (1997) Rothschild's Reserves: time & fragile nature. London: Harley (ISBN 0-946589-62-3)
- Rothschild, Miriam; Garton, Kate; De Rothschild, Lionel & Lawson, Andrew (1997) The Rothschild Gardens: a family tribute to nature. London: Abrams
- Van Emden, Helmut F. and Rothschild, Miriam (eds.) (2004) Insect and Bird Interactions Andover, Hampshire: Intercept (ISBN 1-898298-92-0)

=== Papers ===
- Rothschild, M. (1936) Gigantism and variation in Peringia ulvae Pennant 1777, caused by infection with larval trematodes. Journal of the Marine Biological Association of the United Kingdom 20, 537–46
- Rothschild, M. (1938)a. Further observations on the effect of trematode parasites on Peringia ulvae (Pennant) 1777. Novavit Zool. 41, 84–102
- Rothschild, M. (1938)b. Observations on the growth and trematode infections of Peringia ulvae (Pennant) 1777 in a pool in the Tamar saltings, Plymouth. Parasitology, 33(4), 406–415. doi:10.1017/S0031182000024616
- [many more]
