= Charles Daniel Lane =

British molecular biologist

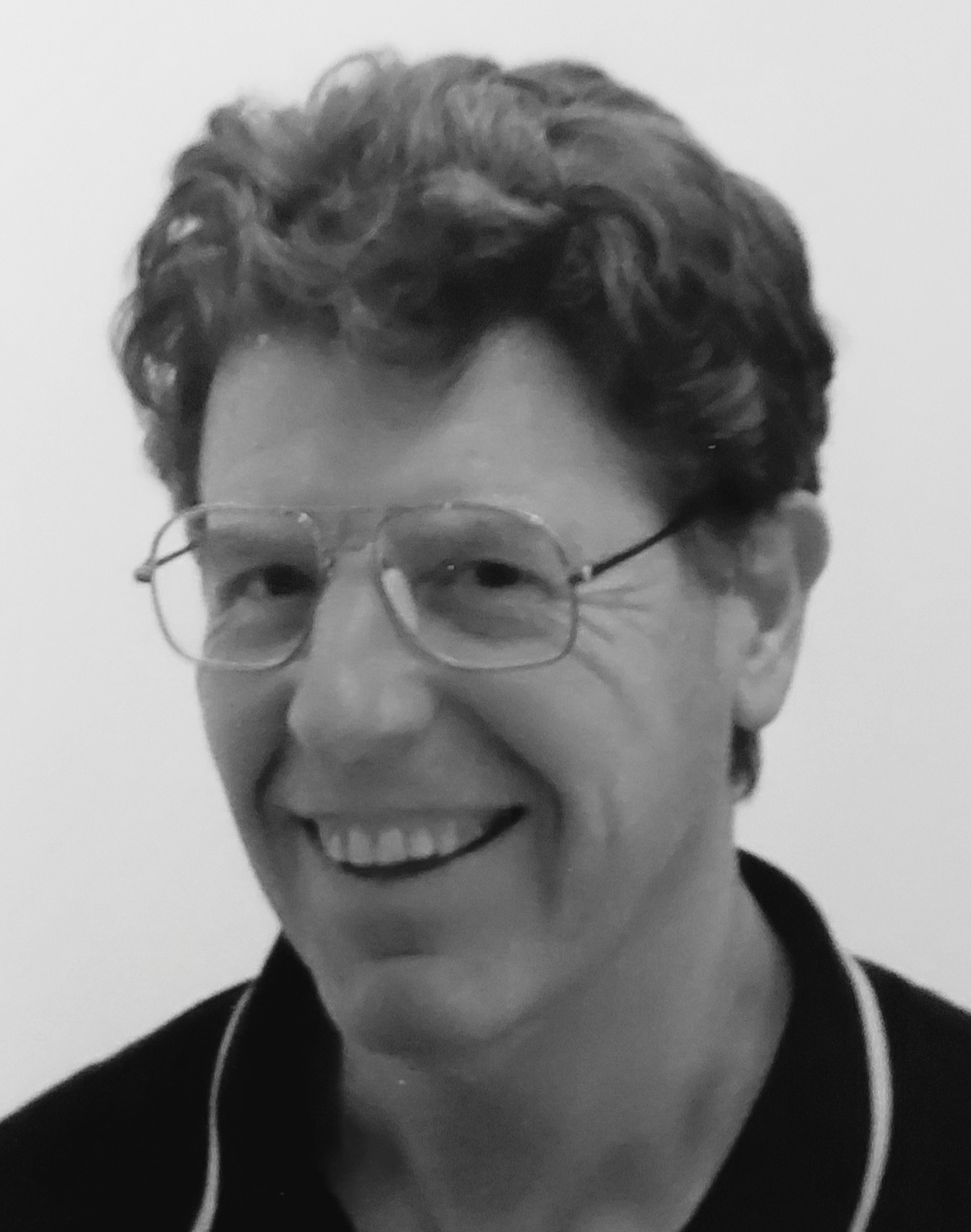
- Born: 1948 (age 77–78); London, England
- Citizenship: British
- Education: Trinity College, Cambridge, Christ Church, Oxford, The Zoology Department, Oxford, The Laboratory of Molecular Biology, Cambridge (UTC) The National Institute for Medical Research (Mill Hill, London UTC)
- Occupation: Molecular biologist
- Parents: George Lane; Miriam Rothschild

Charles Daniel Lane was a British molecular biologist who along with colleagues Gerard Marbaix and John Gurdon discovered the oocyte exogenous mRNA expression system – a system that not only reveals aspects of the control of gene expression but also provides a "living test tube" for the study of macromolecules: such a whole cell system also shows the merits of a non-reductionist approach, and the possibility of mRNA therapeutics.

== Early life and education ==
Lane was the son of biologist and nature conservationist Miriam Rothschild and British Army officer George Lane. As a boy, Charles displayed a passion for moths, butterflies and plants, and with the aid of his mother wrote a number of "anecdotal" papers on subjects such as the migration of butterflies. Charles was also a significant collector of Meadow Brown butterflies for the population genetic studies of E.B. Ford.

Leaving school at 16, Lane joined the biochemistry laboratory of Hans Krebs: much of Lane's work involved studying pyruvate kinase in slices and in homogenates of rat liver. Lane attended Trinity College, Cambridge and Christ Church, Oxford. His University of Oxford doctoral thesis was "The Microinjection of RNA into Eggs and Oocytes of Xenopus Laevis". A hard copy of the thesis can be viewed at the Bodleian Library, Oxford. He then worked at the Medical Research Council Molecular Biology Laboratories at Cambridge and then at the National Institute for Medical Research, at Mill Hill London.

== Career and research ==
Lane is known for the discovery (with colleagues Gerard Marbaix and John Gurdon), of the oocyte surrogate gene expression system, and its subsequent development and refinement (with many colleagues) for the study of post translational events including the study of proteins embedded in cell membranes. Lane believed that John Gurdon's studies on gene expression had further potential.

The discovery that living cells programmed with exogenous messenger RNA can make and correctly modify foreign proteins is a scientific breakthrough for four reasons:

- The foreign mRNA can reveal control mechanisms within the living cell.
- Foreign proteins made within a living cell provide a "living test tube" for the discovery and study of molecules, including many pharmaceuticals – such as those that interact with receptor proteins embedded in cell membranes.
- Messenger RNA Therapeutics may revolutionize many conventional medical treatments – from anti-viral vaccines to heart medicines to cancer vaccines. However, to date no mRNA Therapeutic has yet reached the market place (except COVID-19 Vaccines).

The first key experiment was performed in 1968 by Lane and John Gurdon and followed by a second key experiment involving Gerard Marbaix., verified afterwards: the general characteristics of the novel mRNA expression experimental system were then further defined. The express publication in Nature of the 1971 paper by Gurdon, Lane, Woodland and Marbaix has generated some confusion, because the very slow publication landmark paper by three scientists, namely Charles Lane, Gerard Marbaix and John Gurdon appeared in print at just about the same month (September) of 1971. However, the Nature paper did emphasize that the oocyte exogenous mRNA system had already been used in other experiments (i.e the landmark paper) and the landmark paper was included in the reference of the Nature paper. The key role of Gerard Marbaix (who prepared the globin mRNA) is apparent from the landmark paper.

A vital question was the extent to which the living oocyte could carry out post-translational modifications and the answer, indicating near universality, began to emerge. The ability of the oocyte to process correctly and locate correctly foreign particles renders this whole cell system generally useful. The system has also been used to evaluate control systems within the living cell. This basic discovery has generated a significant literature and the Xenopus oocyte microinjection system has become a standard feature of many laboratories, whilst the philosophy behind using the cell as a "living test tube" has spread far beyond the simple oocyte system – not least to mRNA therapeutics.

In 1976, Scientific American published a popular article by Lane entitled "Rabbit Haemoglobin from Frog Eggs". One can argue that the discovery of the oocyte expression system has given rise to a new albeit minor branch of molecular biology, with a substantial number of scientific papers published each year ( please see reviews by Lane CD and Morel C, Bloemendal et al, Smith M et al and Jacobson A, Lane CD and Alton). Whilst the expression system enjoys proven usefulness for receptor studies, there is little direct evidence that mRNA therapeutics will have a general impact on medical practices.

The Xenopus oocyte expression system has since become a standard tool in molecular and cell biology and has contributed to research recognised by the Nobel Prize. Peter Agre's identification of aquaporin water channels, for which he shared the 2003 Nobel Prize in Chemistry, was demonstrated by expressing the protein in Xenopus oocytes; oocytes producing the protein swelled and ruptured in a dilute solution, confirming its function as a water channel.

The initial studies which led to this discovery, were performed in the old Zoology Department building (at Oxford). Even before Lane had finished his doctoral thesis he was elected (age 22) a Research Fellow of Trinity College, Cambridge – one of the youngest persons ever to be elected a Fellow of a Cambridge College.

Lane had realised that the oocyte system enjoyed enormous potential for the study of post translational events, and an early (1971) Proceeding of the National Academy of Sciences paper with Hans Bloemendal, Anton Berns, Ger Strous and Michael Matthews focused on that which, in terms of post-translational events, the oocyte system could and could not do. That which it could not do turned out to be extremely rare – the oocyte could even accurately modify honey bee promelittin made under the direction of injected venom gland mRNA and could even, insert foreign proteins into membranes in a functional state. For about 14 years, Lane's research focused on the oocyte as a system for studying post translational (and other) downstream events. Lane was not interested in the use of the oocyte as a system for studies with exogenous DNA, believing that other systems were better suited to upstream studies: nonetheless, the oocyte system has its uses for such endeavors, especially as regards the study of transcription.

Lane died in 2026.

== Further works & reviews ==
- Lane CD, Marbaix G and Gurdon JB (1971) 9S RNA from reticulocytes and is assay in frog oocytes. The Biology & Radiobiology of Anucleate Systems Academic Press. Ed S. Bonotto
- Lane CD, Marbaix G and Gurdon JB (1971). The translation of reticulocyte 9S RNA in frog oocytes gives rise to alpha and beta globin chains. Communication to FEBS meeting at Vauna, Bulgaria
- Lane CD, Marbaix G et Gurdon JB (1972). Traduction du RNA 9S de reticulocytes de lapin en chaines de globine dan les oeufs et les oocytes de xenope. Archive Internationales de Physiologie et de Biochimie 80 (5) pages 973–974
- Lane CD and Morel C (1972). The translation of duck 9S RNA in frog oocytes. Communication to the Biochemical Society of Brazil
- Bloemendal H, Berns A, Strous G, Matthews M, and Lane CD (1972). Translation of eukaryotic messenger RNA in various heterologous systems. "RNA Viruses/Ribosomes" Pub. North-Holland
- Smith M, Stavnezar J, Huang R-C, Gurdon JB and Lane CD (1973). Mouse immunoglobin synthesis in frog cell: the translation of 9-13S myeloma RNA in frog oocytes. Journal of Molecular Biology 80 pages 553–557
- Jacobson A, Lane CD and Alton T (1975). Electrophoretic separation of the major species of slime mould messenger RNA. "Microbiology" (Proc. Of Asiolma Symp) Ed. Dworkin & Shapiro.
- Jacobson A, Palatnik CM, Lane CD, Mabie C and Wilkins C (1975). Fractionation of mRNAs from Dictyostelium discoideum EMBO workshop on Development and Differentiation in slime molds Ed. P Capucinelli North-Holland Press Amsterdam
