= Ashton, North Northamptonshire =

Village in Northamptonshire, England

Coordinates: 52.482°N 0.4476°W

Ashton
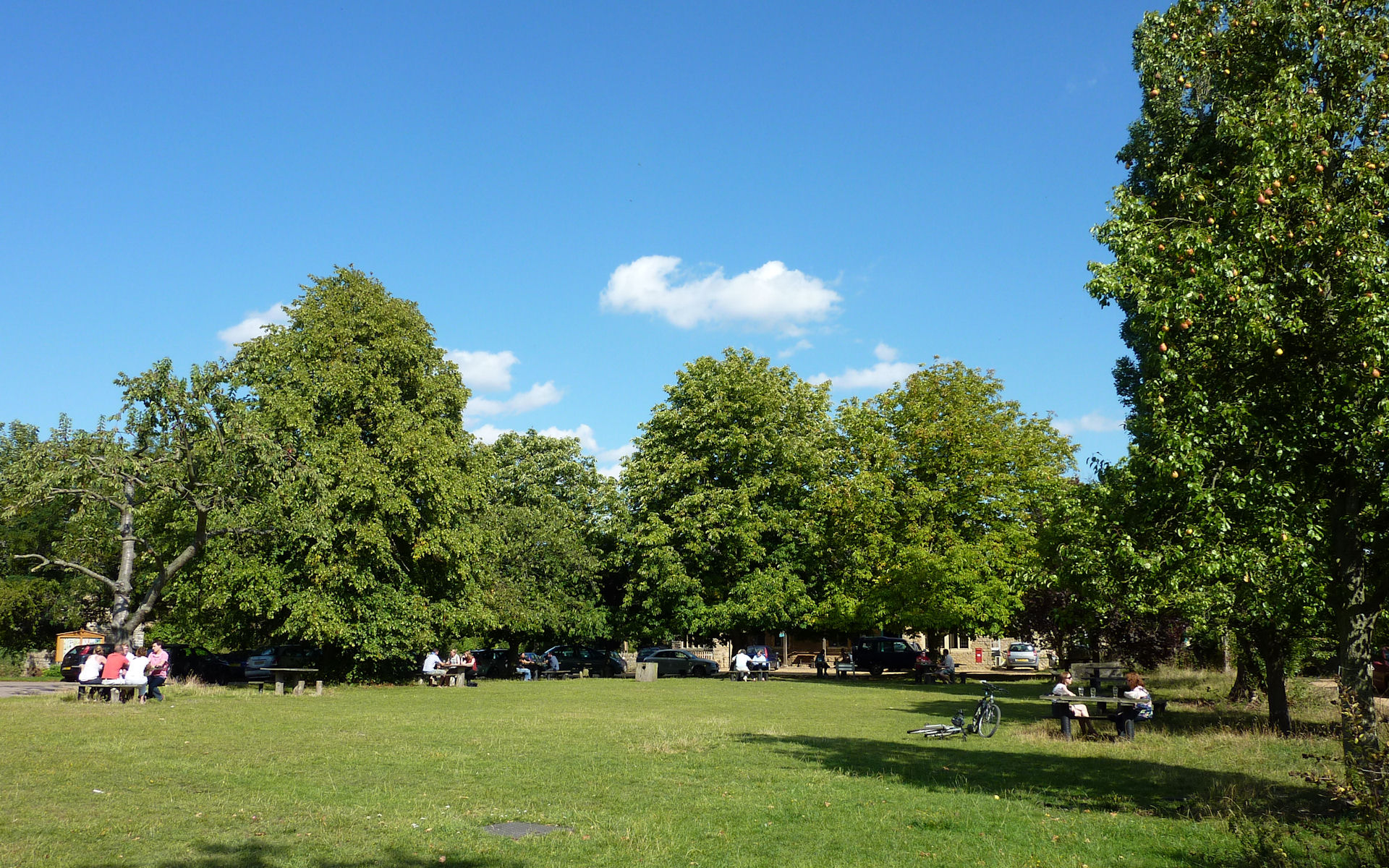
- The Village Green at Ashton

- Location within Northamptonshire
- Population: 219 (2011)
- OS grid reference: TL0588
- Unitary authority: North Northamptonshire
- Ceremonial county: Northamptonshire
- Region: East Midlands
- Country: England
- Sovereign state: United Kingdom
- Post town: PETERBOROUGH
- Postcode district: PE8
- Dialling code: 01832
- Police: Northamptonshire
- Fire: Northamptonshire
- Ambulance: East Midlands

Ashton is a village and civil parish about ¾ mile east of Oundle in the east of the English county of Northamptonshire forming part of the unitary authority of North Northamptonshire. The population of the civil parish at the 2011 census was 219.

== History ==
The villages name means 'ash-tree farm/settlement'. The Manor of Ashton is mentioned in the Domesday Book of 1086. The manor house was rebuilt by the Marriott family c1600.

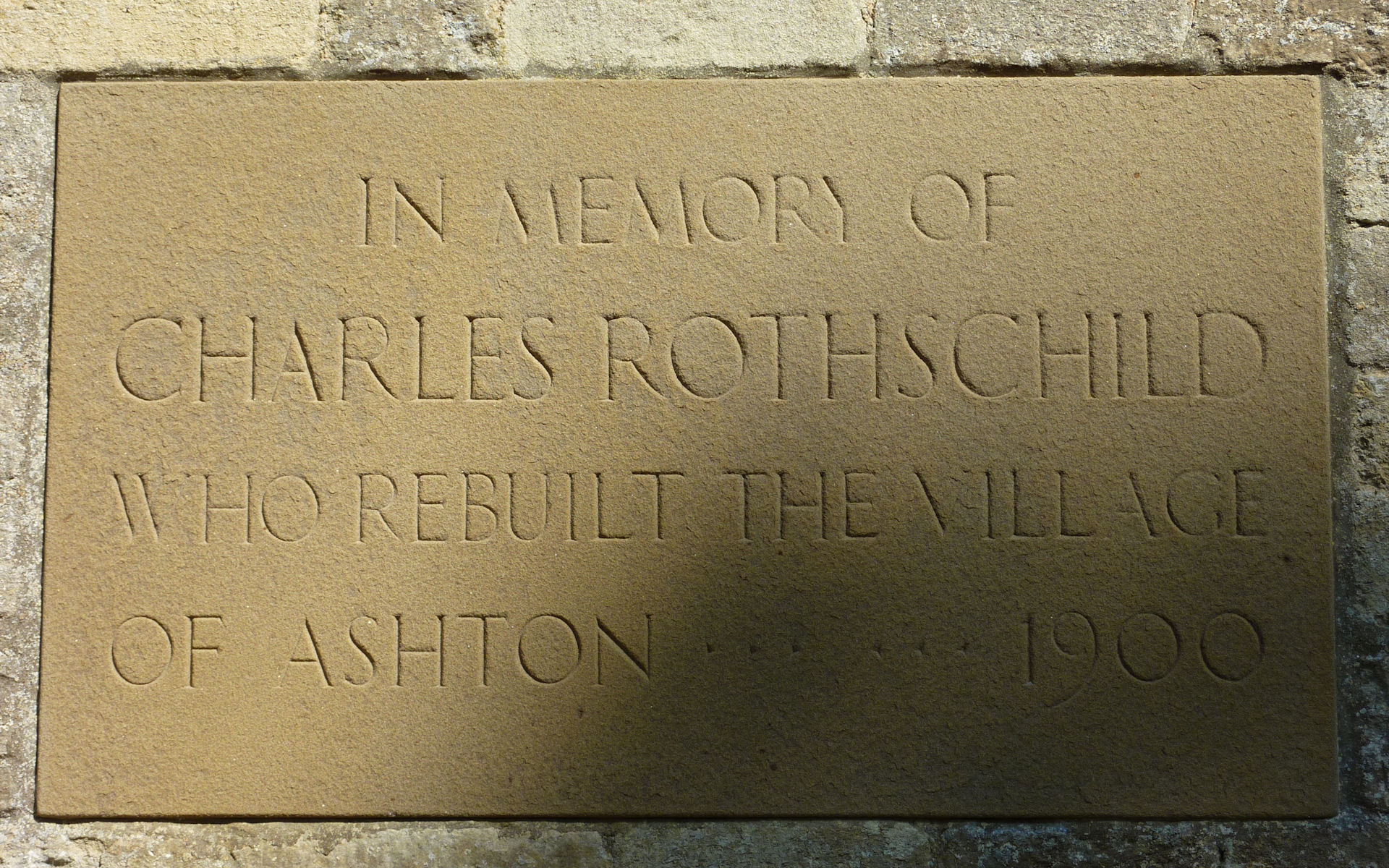
Commemorative stone in memory of Charles Rothschild on the wall of the Chapel

Ashton was re-built in 1900 by the Rothschild family for estate workers, to designs by William Huckvale.

The village is the birthplace of Miriam Rothschild, natural scientist and author.

In 1952 George and Lillian Peach were murdered at their home in the village. The crime remains Northamptonshire's oldest unsolved murder case.

The World Conker Championships was founded at Ashton in 1965 when a group of anglers held a conker contest at the Chequered Skipper pub when the weather was too bad to go fishing. The event was held in Ashton for 45 years before moving to a larger venue in Southwick, Northamptonshire in 2009.

== Notable buildings ==
Ashton Wold house was built in 1900 for Charles Rothschild (d. 1923). The architect was William Huckvale and the house is in the Tudor style.

Many of the cottages in the village date from 1900 to 1901 and were designed by Huckvale. Two more cottages were added in 1945 in the same style; Pevsner refers to Ashton as a model village. The cottages are Tudor style and thatched. Almost all of the buildings the village are Grade II or II* listed.

The Creed Chapel (or the Chapel of St Mary Magdalene) and adjacent school room date from circa 1705 and is Grade II listed. The manor house is from the 15th century.

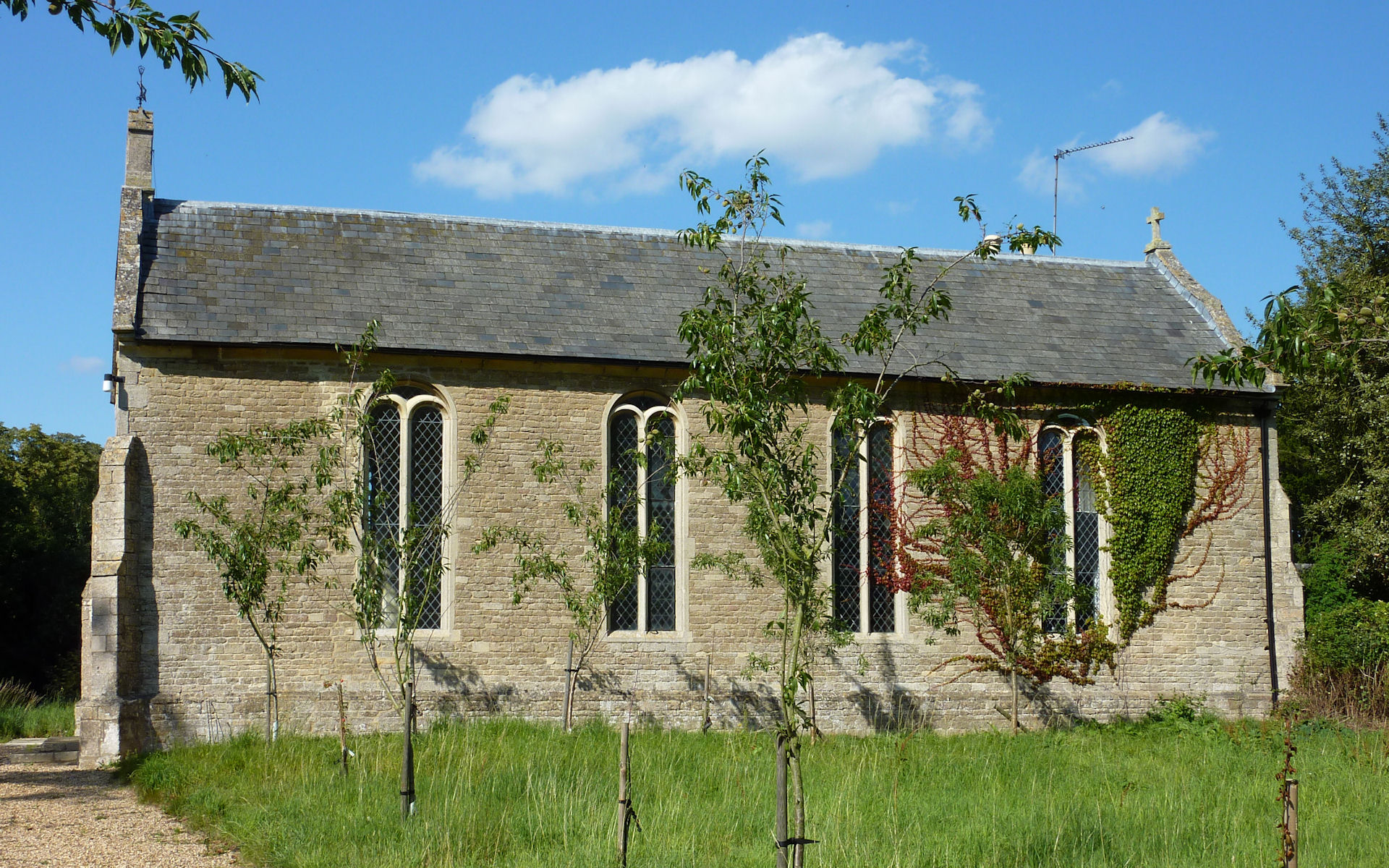
Chapel of St Mary Magdalene at Ashton

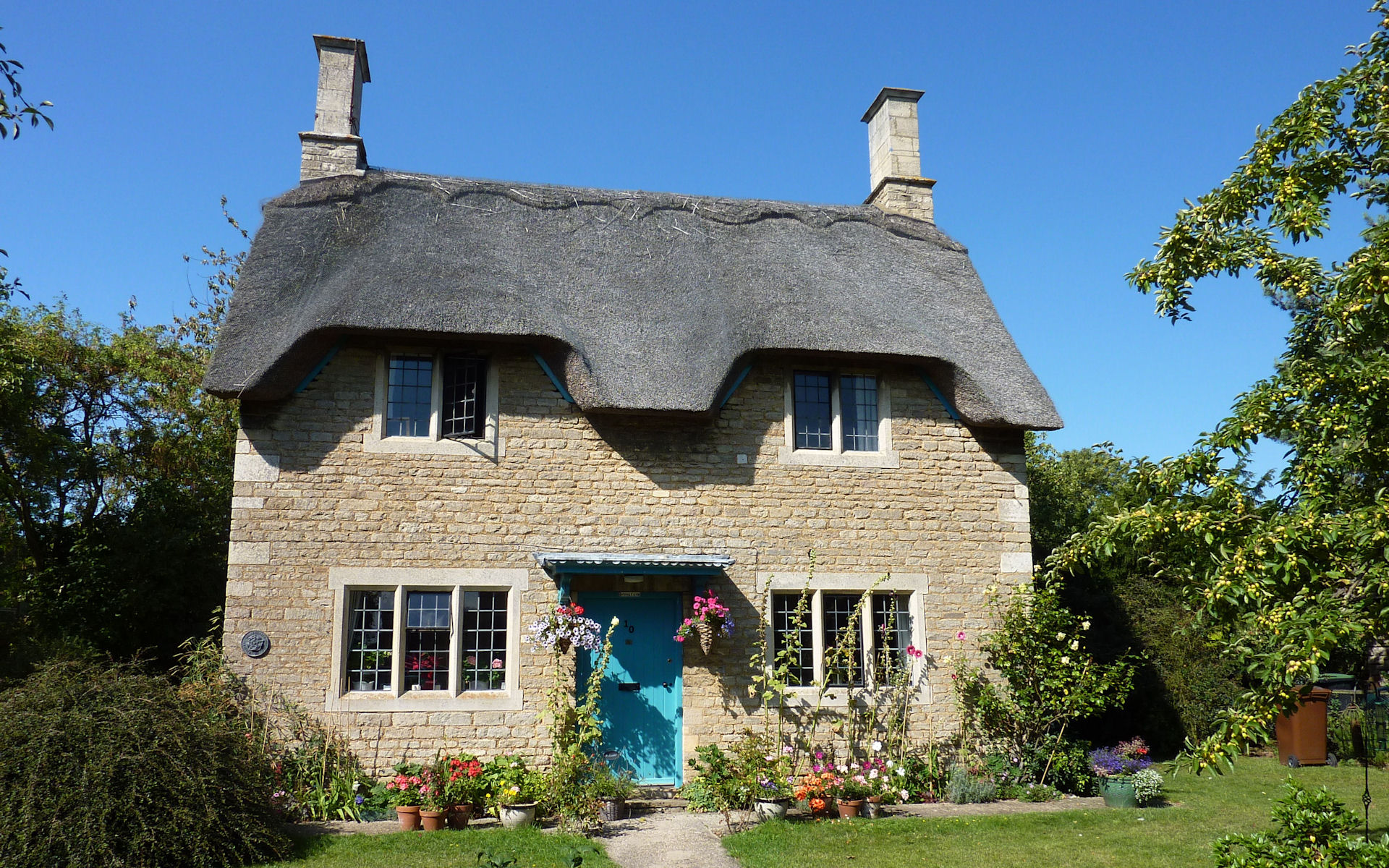
Brimstone Cottage, 10 The Green, Ashton

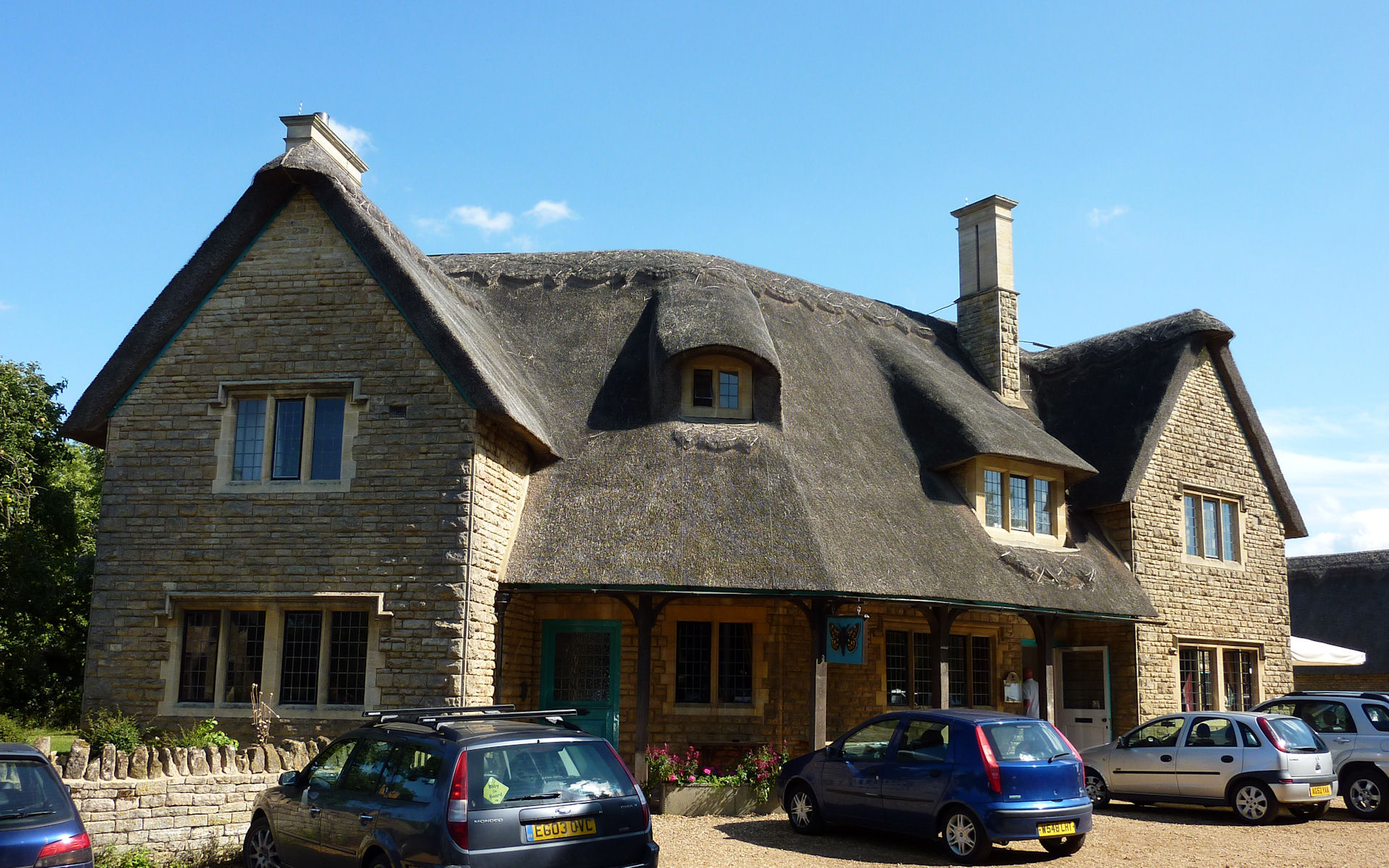
The Chequered Skipper pub at Ashton

== Notable people ==
- Miriam Louisa Rothschild DBE FRS (1908–2005), zoologist, entomologist and botanist, was born in Ashton
