= John David Bradley =

British lepidopterist (1920–2004)

John David Bradley (24 January 1920 – 4 January 2004) was a British lepidopterist. He is best known for his works with Arthur Smith and Gerry Tremewan in British Tortricoid Moths. He also appears in the Acknowledgements section of almost every work on microlepidoptera in recent decades.

== Early life ==
Bradley was born in Wimbledon, London on 24 January 1920, and began his interest in insects during his childhood. He left school at 16 to become a lab assistant in bacteriology at the London School of Hygiene and Tropical Medicine. In 1938, Bradley joined the British Museum as a Preparator, but the Second World War interrupted. He then spent a few years in the armed forces in Austria, Italy, and North Africa.

== Career ==
After the war, Bradley returned to the Museum and began work on the curation of Samuel Rush Meyrick's collection. He joined the Commonwealth Institute of Entomology in 1964. His task was identifying microlepidoptera sent in from various parts of the world. In 1960–1964, he was editor of the Entomologist's Gazette. After London, he settled in Somerset, where he became involved with the Somerset Moth Group.

Bradley described many species, including Cryptophlebia pallifimbriana, Ethmia phricotypa, and Anarsia taurella.

He published more than a hundred papers before the year 2000.

== Legacy ==
His biography was published in Acta Entomologica Bohemoslovaca.

== See also ==
- British Tortricoid Moths
- European Journal of Entomology
