= Arthur Smith (illustrator) =

British natural history illustrator

Arthur Smith illustration of Episinus egg sac from 'The World of Spiders' by William Syer Bristowe

Arthur Smith ARCA (1916–1991) was a British natural history illustrator who specialised in entomology. He was born in the village of Eastburn, between Skipton and Keighley in Yorkshire, UK.

During his youth he developed a keen interest in natural history from walks on the Yorkshire Moors. At 15 he attended Keighley College of Arts and Crafts and then the Royal College of Art in London. He graduated with a Silver Medal awarded for Special Distinction in the School of Design (then the highest order).

In 1940 he commenced his career as a freelance illustrator at the British Museum (Nat. Hist.). To avoid the disruption of the London Blitz during World War II he moved to Letchworth at the invitation of a colleague, Frederick Wallace Edwards. Edwards died shortly afterwards, but had put Smith in touch with James Edward Collin, for whom he produced 950 illustrations for the latter's book on British empididae. The book was eventually published in 1961.

Smith also collaborated with Dame Miriam Rothschild illustrating her book: Fleas, Flukes and Cuckoos (Rothschild and Clay, 1952). This led to him illustrating, with over 1000 drawings, An Illustrated Catalogue of the Rothschild Collection of Fleas (Siphonaptera) in the British Museum (Natural History), an enormous work of 5 large volumes published between 1953 and 1971.

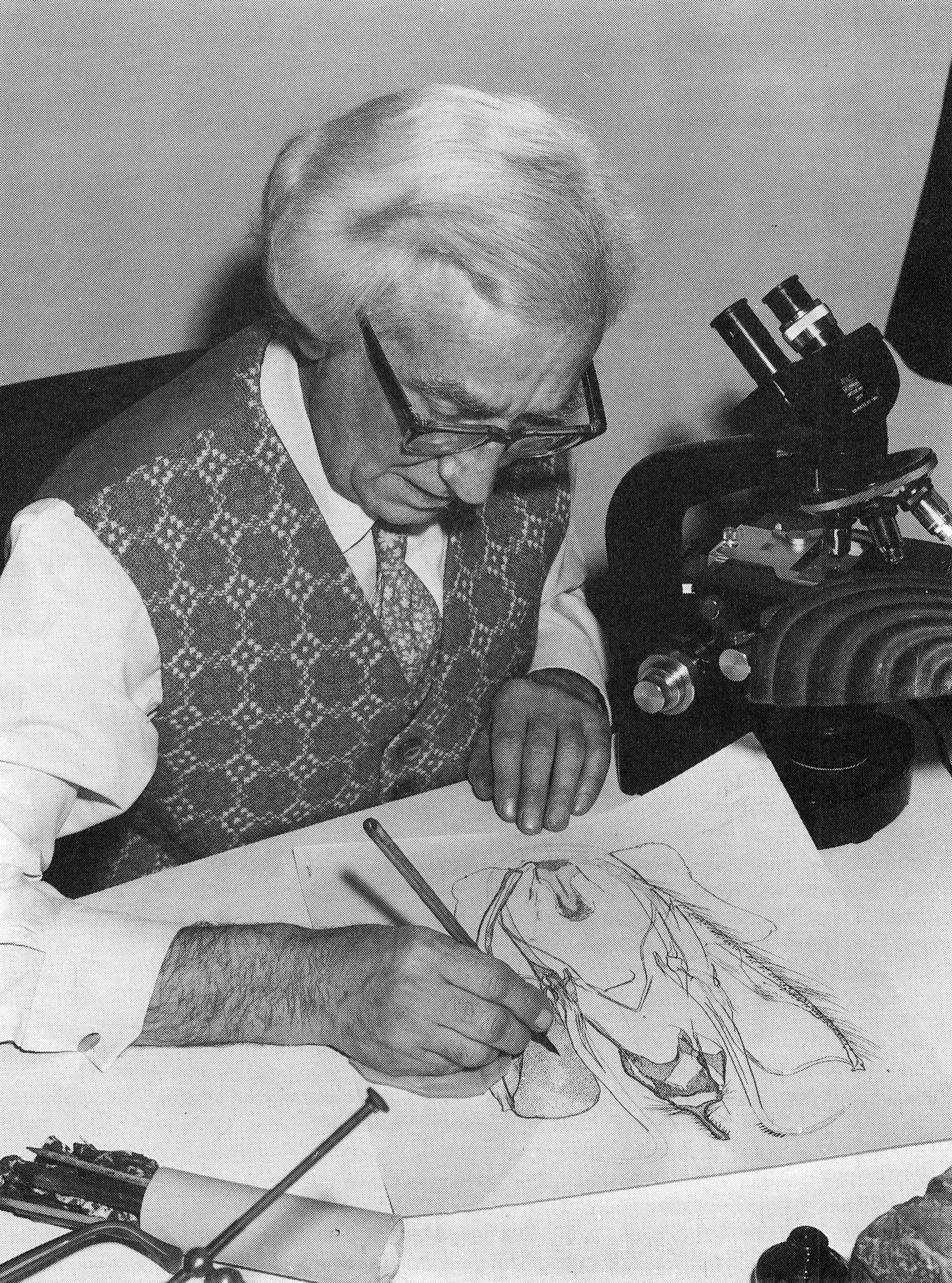
Arthur Smith at work in the Department of Entomology in the early 1970s. The illustration is of Zamarada cydippe (Fletcher, 1974).

His work illustrated over 60 books, pamphlets and reports in addition to other freelance work for magazines.

In 1960 he became a member of staff of the British Museum (Nat. Hist.) as the first (and possibly the last) insect illustrator to be employed in the Department of Entomology.

Arthur Smith's last major undertaking was the illustration of a two volume work, British Tortricoid Moths, co-authoring with J. D. Bradley and W. G. Tremewan. However, before the publication of the book he had retired to Shaftesbury, Dorset. He continued to produce art work up to a few weeks before his death.

Arthur Smith married Margaret Eagle in 1940. He was survived by his wife, who died in 2001, and by two of his three children (Paul and Jean) and five grandchildren. His elder daughter, Heather, died in 1978.
