= European Journal of Entomology =

- Discipline: Entomology
- Language: English
- Edited by: Petr Svacha

Publication details
- Former names: Acta Societatis Entomologicae Bohemiae; Acta entomologica Bohemoslovaca
- History: 1904–present
- Publisher: Czech Academy of Sciences (Czech Republic)
- Frequency: Quarterly
- Open access: Yes
- License: CC BY 4.0
- Impact factor: 1.061 (2011)

Standard abbreviations
- ISO 4: Eur. J. Entomol.

Indexing
- ISSN: 1210-5759 (print); 1802-8829 (web)
- OCLC no.: 488234955

Links
- Journal homepage; Online access

The European Journal of Entomology (EJE) is a quarterly peer-reviewed open access scientific journal published by the Czech Academy of Sciences. It covers research in entomology, including studies on Myriapoda, Chelicerata, and terrestrial Crustacea. It was established in 1904 by the Czech Entomological Society under the title Acta Societatis Entomologicae Bohemiae, then later as Acta Entomologica Bohemoslovaca. The insect depicted on the cover of the journal is Pyrrhocoris apterus. According to the Journal Citation Reports, the journal had an impact factor of 1.061 in 2011. In 2016, the journal became electronic-only and open access.
