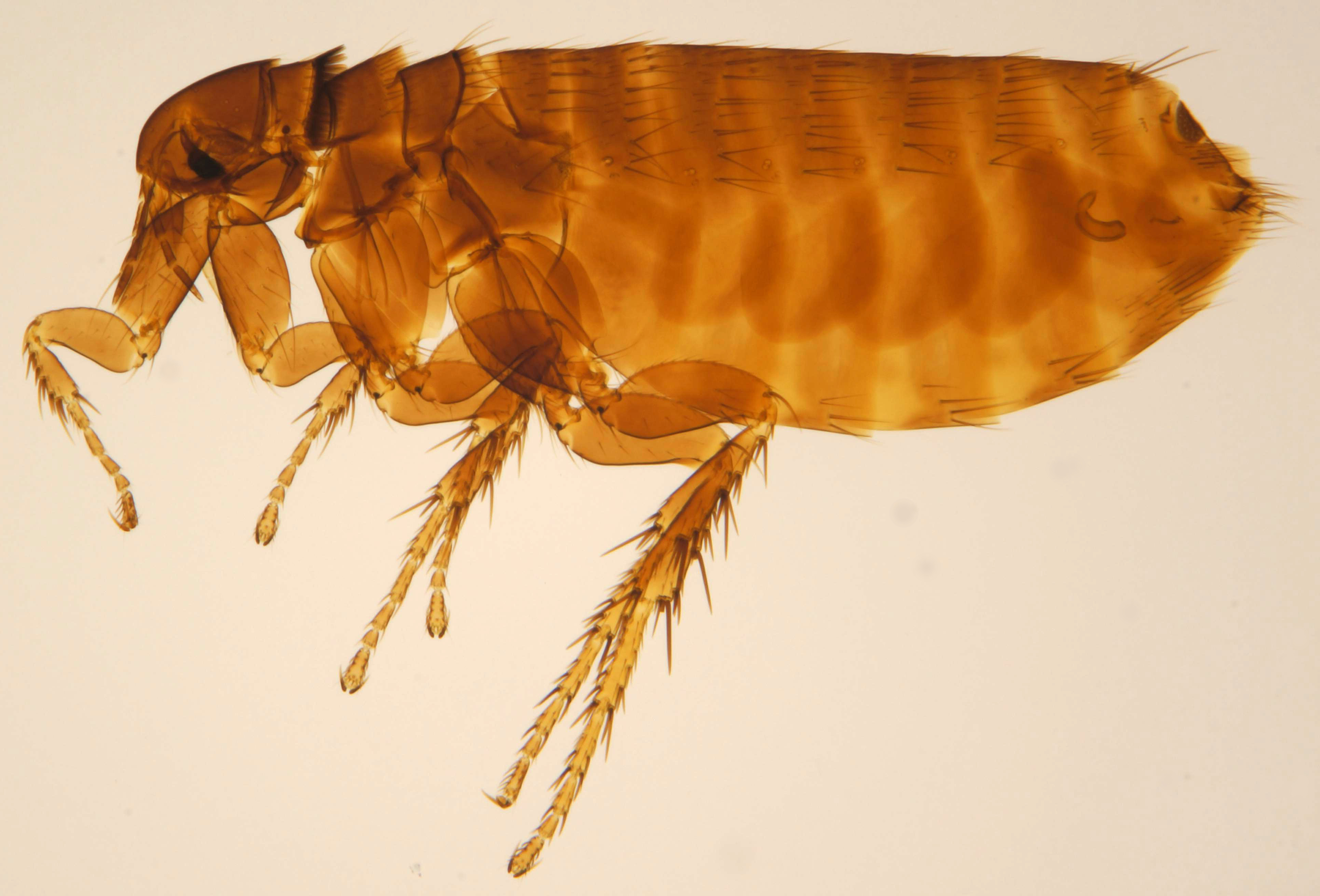
- Female hen flea

Scientific classification
- Domain: Eukaryota
- Kingdom: Animalia
- Phylum: Arthropoda
- Class: Insecta
- Order: Siphonaptera
- Family: Ceratophyllidae
- Genus: Ceratophyllus
- Species: C. gallinae

Binomial name
- Ceratophyllus gallinae (Schrank, 1803)

= Ceratophyllus gallinae =

Species of flea

Ceratophyllus gallinae, known as the hen flea in Europe or the European chicken flea elsewhere, is an ectoparasite of birds. This flea was first described by the German botanist and entomologist Franz von Paula Schrank in 1803.

== Taxonomy ==
Ceratophyllus gallinae was first described as Pulex gallinae by Franz von Paula Schrank in 1803 in the third volume of his Fauna Boica. It was eventually moved to the genus Ceratophyllus, which was described in 1832 by John Curtis, in his British Entomology. In this genus, C. gallinae is a member of the nominate subgenus, Ceratophyllus.

== Distribution ==
C. gallinae originated in Europe but became cosmopolitan with the spread of poultry. It is more prevalent in cooler regions.

These fleas are estimated to occupy a range of 36,000,000 square kilometres (14,000,000 sq mi).

== Description ==
The adult Ceratophyllus gallinae is some 2 to 2.5 mm (0.08 to 0.10 in) long, laterally flattened, and brown. It has a pair of simple eyes, a proboscis for sucking blood, and a characteristic four to six bristles on the femur of the hind leg. The basal segments of the legs do not bear spines. Adults lack a genal ctenidium but have a noticeable pronotal ctenidium.

== Hosts ==
Ceratophyllus gallinae has a broad host range, being associated with several species of birds with dry cavity or semi-cavity nests, mostly constructed in bushes and trees. It commonly attacks poultry, and can bite humans and other mammals. Another bird flea, C. garei, is associated with the often wet, ground-built nests of ducks, waders and other water birds. A third common bird flea, found on many hosts, is the moorhen flea, and this, in contrast to the other two species, hitches a ride on the bird itself rather than living almost exclusively in its nest, and thus becomes widely dispersed. A further species with multiple bird hosts is C. borealis, found in the nests of passerines and cliff-nesting sea birds. C. borealis has been known to hybridise with C. gallinae.

Ceratophyllus gallinae is most prevalent in birds with nests in nest-holes and crevices. Infestations of nests in nest-holes and crevices are also more intense, meaning that there are more wintering C. gallinae in those nests.

There are reasons to believe that the original host of C. gallinae was a tit, but the flea is now present, via domestic poultry, on numerous islands where there are no representatives of the tit family. The tit family does provide the optimal reproductive conditions for C. gallinae, suggesting that it is the main host of this species. This flea has often been recorded from squirrels' dreys, and squirrel fleas have been found in birds' nests. When a domestic cat catches a bird, it often plays with it, and as the bird cools, any fleas it carries are likely to transfer to the warm-blooded cat. There they can feed, but whether they can survive for some time and breed on the cat is unclear.

== Ecology ==
Although many species of flea require a blood meal before they can copulate, that is not the case with Ceratophyllus gallinae. As with other fleas, the life cycle consists of eggs, the larval stages, a pupal stage and an adult stage. The larvae have chewing jaws and it is only the adult fleas that are capable of biting the host. Under optimal conditions of temperature and humidity, adults can emerge from the cocoon in 23 days. How many generations there are in the year depends on how many broods their host bird rears. The fleas usually undergo metamorphosis and overwinter as pre-emergent adults. These are fully formed within the cocoon and emerge when certain stimuli occur; suitable stimuli are vibration, heat, or increased levels of carbon dioxide.

These fleas generally come into contact with their host by jumping. The jumping is found to be initiated when the intensity of light is reduced. The host is infected during the spring, when it is foraging on the ground.

Fleas like C. gallinae that are found in nests often develop a defined breeding season, which coincides with that of their host. Associated with this is their ability to survive away from the host. C. gallinae has often been collected far away from its host or the host's nest, under flakes of bark, in cracks or among leaves, where it fasts for an indeterminate period.

The largest number of C. gallinae reported from a single bird's nest was 5,754 fleas, from the nest of a coal tit.
