= Ctenophthalmus nepalensis =

Fictional species of flea in 1969 hoax

Ctenophthalmus nepalensis was a fictional species of parasitic flea described by a pseudonymous author Otto Suteminn in 1969 as part of a scientific hoax. The description was published in the journal Zeitschrift der Arbeitsgemeinschaft Österreichischer Entomologen to ostensibly to demonstrate how poor their editorial process was. The hoax was uncovered only in 1973.

== Hoax details and background ==
The hoax was foisted by Hans Malicky, who was the chairperson of the Entomological Society of Austria in the late 1960s. He sought to improve the quality of publishing by the society newsletter Entomologische Nachrichtenblatt which led to him being relieved from the post. The hoax article was published shortly after in 1969.

The journal paper described two new species of fleas named Ctenophthalmus nepalensis and Amalareus fossoris, both purportedly from Nepal by the author "Otto Suteminn". It was not until 1972 that the hoax was uncovered in an article by flea taxonomist F.G.A.M. Smit of the Natural History Museum, London who published “Notes on Two Fictitious Fleas from Nepal” in the journal Entomologische Nachrichtenblatt.

Smit identified that not only were the species hoaxes but so were their hosts Canis fossor (meaning grave-digging dog) and Apodemus roseus. Along with an Austrian colleague, Smit figured out that the locality mentioned "Khanshnid Khaib" was probably the Austrian dialect transcription for "Ganz nicht habe" which means "cannot exist"; "Samashtir" possibly stood for "Sind wir Stier" which is Viennese slang for "we have no money"; and the collector name "leg. Z. Minař" would, pronounced appropriately, mean "from my anus".

According to the entomologist Michael Ohl who described the case in his book The Art of Naming (2018), "Suteminn" was a pseudonym for a fictional knight Otto von Moltke in a story by Karl May in which the knight would retreat into a secret lab and conduct scientific experiments. Another author has identified the Canis fossor as being associated with Arthur Schütz and his invention called the "Grubenhund", a kind of hoax popular in Austria. A grubenhund was a term that came to be associated with a reader contribution written to a newspaper in order to demonstrate gullibility and is named after the example written by the engineer Arthur Schütz under the pseudonym Dr. Ing.Erich Ritter von Winkler to the Neue Freie Presse in 1911. In this letter he claimed that his dog (grubenhund) showed signs of the November 1911 earthquake half an hour in advance. Schütz popularized the word in his book Der Grubenhund eine kultursatire (1931). One of the other fleas that Malicky mentions in his hoax paper is A. pencilliger which is Amalaraeus penicilliger (Grube, 1851), the fake author's name playing with the term Grubenhund.
