= Dasypsyllus plumosissimus =

Scientific classification
- Domain: Eukaryota
- Kingdom: Animalia
- Phylum: Arthropoda
- Class: Insecta
- Order: Siphonaptera
- Family: Ceratophyllidae
- Genus: Dasypsyllus
- Species: D. plumosissimus

Binomial name
- Dasypsyllus plumosissimus Smit, 1976

Species of flea

Dasypsyllus plumosissimus is a species of flea in the family Ceratophyllidae. It was described by Smit in 1976.
