= Ceratophyllus zhovtyi =

Scientific classification
- Domain: Eukaryota
- Kingdom: Animalia
- Phylum: Arthropoda
- Class: Insecta
- Order: Siphonaptera
- Family: Ceratophyllidae
- Genus: Ceratophyllus
- Species: C. zhovtyi

Binomial name
- Ceratophyllus zhovtyi Emel'yanova et Goncharov, 1966

Species of flea

Ceratophyllus zhovtyi is a species of flea in the family Aplin. It was described by Emel'yanova and Goncharov in 1966.
