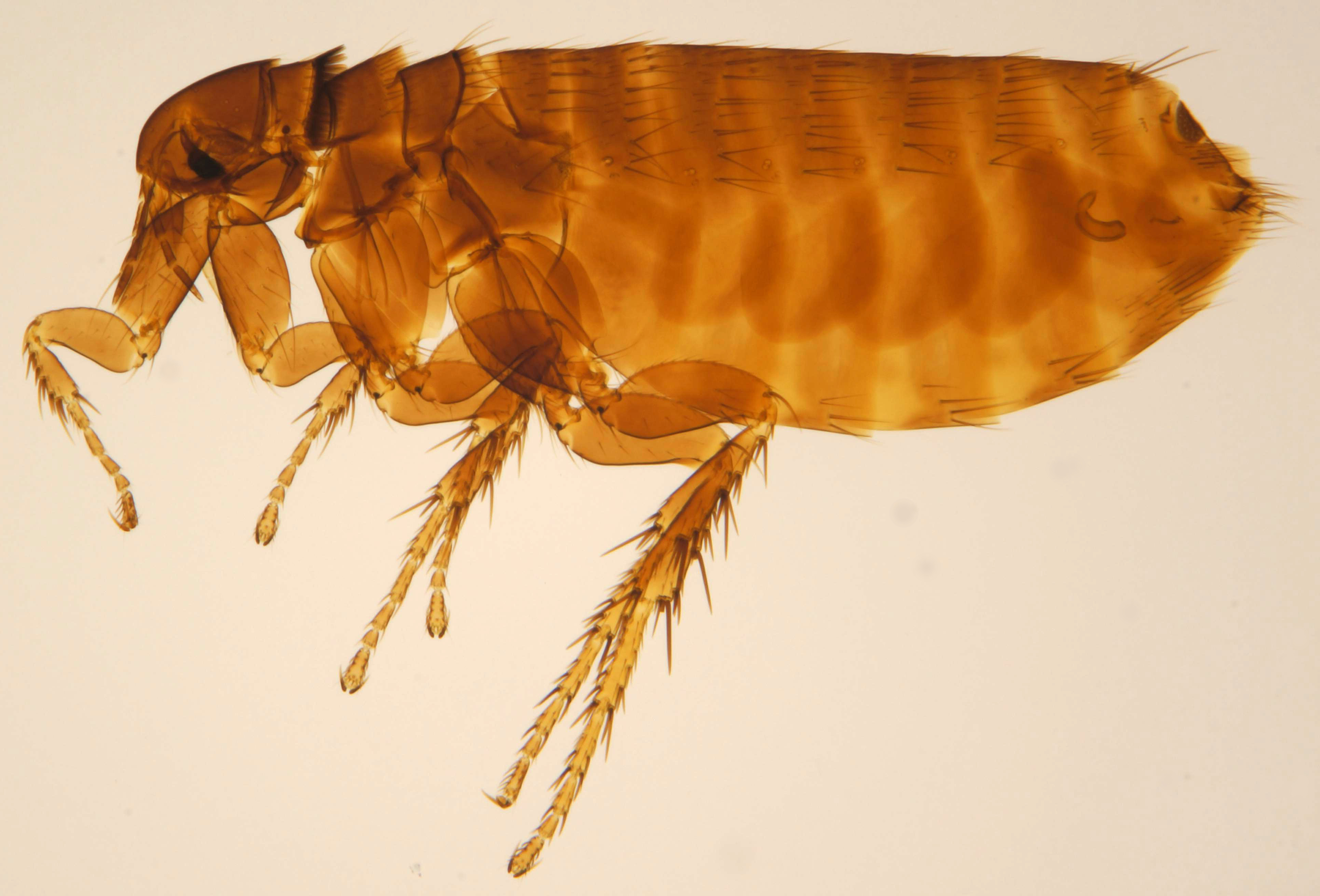
- Ceratophyllus gallinae female

Scientific classification
- Kingdom: Animalia
- Phylum: Arthropoda
- Class: Insecta
- Order: Siphonaptera
- Family: Ceratophyllidae
- Subfamily: Ceratophyllinae
- Genus: Ceratophyllus; Curtis, 1831

= Ceratophyllus =

Genus of fleas

Ceratophyllus is a widespread genus of fleas found in temperate climates. Some of its members include the chicken flea, Ceratophyllus gallinae, and the poultry flea, Ceratophyllus niger.

== Species ==
- Ceratophyllus adustus Jordan, 1932
- Ceratophyllus affinis Nordberg, 1935
- Ceratophyllus altus Tipton et Mendez, 1966
- Ceratophyllus arcuegens Holland, 1952
- Ceratophyllus avicitelli Ioff, 1946
- Ceratophyllus borealis Rothschild, 1907
- Ceratophyllus breviprojectus Liu, Wu et Wu, 1966
- Ceratophyllus calderwoodi Holland, 1979
- Ceratophyllus caliotes Jordan, 1937
- Ceratophyllus celsus Jordan, 1926
- Ceratophyllus chasteli Beaucournu, Monnat et Launay, 1982
- Ceratophyllus chutsaensis Liu Lienchu et Wu Houyong, 1962
- Ceratophyllus ciliatus Baker, 1904
- Ceratophyllus coahuilensis Eads, 1956
- Ceratophyllus columbae Gervais, 1844
- Ceratophyllus delichoni Nordberg, 1935
- Ceratophyllus diffinis Jordan, 1925
- Ceratophyllus enefdeae Ioff, 1950
- Ceratophyllus farreni Rothschild, 1905
- Ceratophyllus fionnus Usher, 1968
- Ceratophyllus frigoris Darskaya, 1950
- Ceratophyllus fringillae Walker, 1856
- Ceratophyllus gallinae (Schrank, 1803)
- Ceratophyllus garei Rothschild, 1902
- Ceratophyllus gilvus Jordan et Rothschild, 1922
- Ceratophyllus hagoromo Jameson et Sakaguti, 1959
- Ceratophyllus hirundinis Curtis, 1826
- Ceratophyllus idius Jordan et Rothschild, 1922
- Ceratophyllus igii Darskaya et Shiranovich, 1971
- Ceratophyllus lari Holland, 1951
- Ceratophyllus liae Wu Wenzhen et Li Chao, 1990
- Ceratophyllus lunatus Jordan et Rothschild, 1920
- Ceratophyllus maculatus Wagner, 1927
- Ceratophyllus nanshanensis Tsai Liyuen, Pan Fenchun et Liu Chuan, 1980
- Ceratophyllus niger Fox, 1908
- Ceratophyllus olsufjevi Scalon et Violovich, 1961
- Ceratophyllus orites Jordan, 1937
- Ceratophyllus pelecani Augustson, 1932
- Ceratophyllus petrochelidoni Wagner, 1936
- Ceratophyllus phrillinae Smit, 1976
- Ceratophyllus picatilis Cai Liyun et Wu Wenzhen, 1988
- Ceratophyllus pullatus Jordan et Rothschild, 1920
- Ceratophyllus qinghaiensis Zhang Guangdeng et Ma Liming, 1985
- Ceratophyllus rauschi Holland, 1960
- Ceratophyllus rossittensis Dampf, 1913
- Ceratophyllus rusticus Wagner, 1903
- Ceratophyllus sclerapicalis Tsai Liyuen, Wu Wenching et Liu Chiying, 1974
- Ceratophyllus scopulorum Holland, 1952
- Ceratophyllus sinicus Jordan, 1932
- Ceratophyllus spinosus Wagner, 1903
- Ceratophyllus styx Rothschild, 1900
- Ceratophyllus titicacensis Boheman, 1866
- Ceratophyllus tribulis Jordan, 1926
- Ceratophyllus vagabundus Jordan, 1926
- Ceratophyllus wui Wang et Liu, 1996
- Ceratophyllus zhovtyi Emel'yanova et Goncharov, 1966
