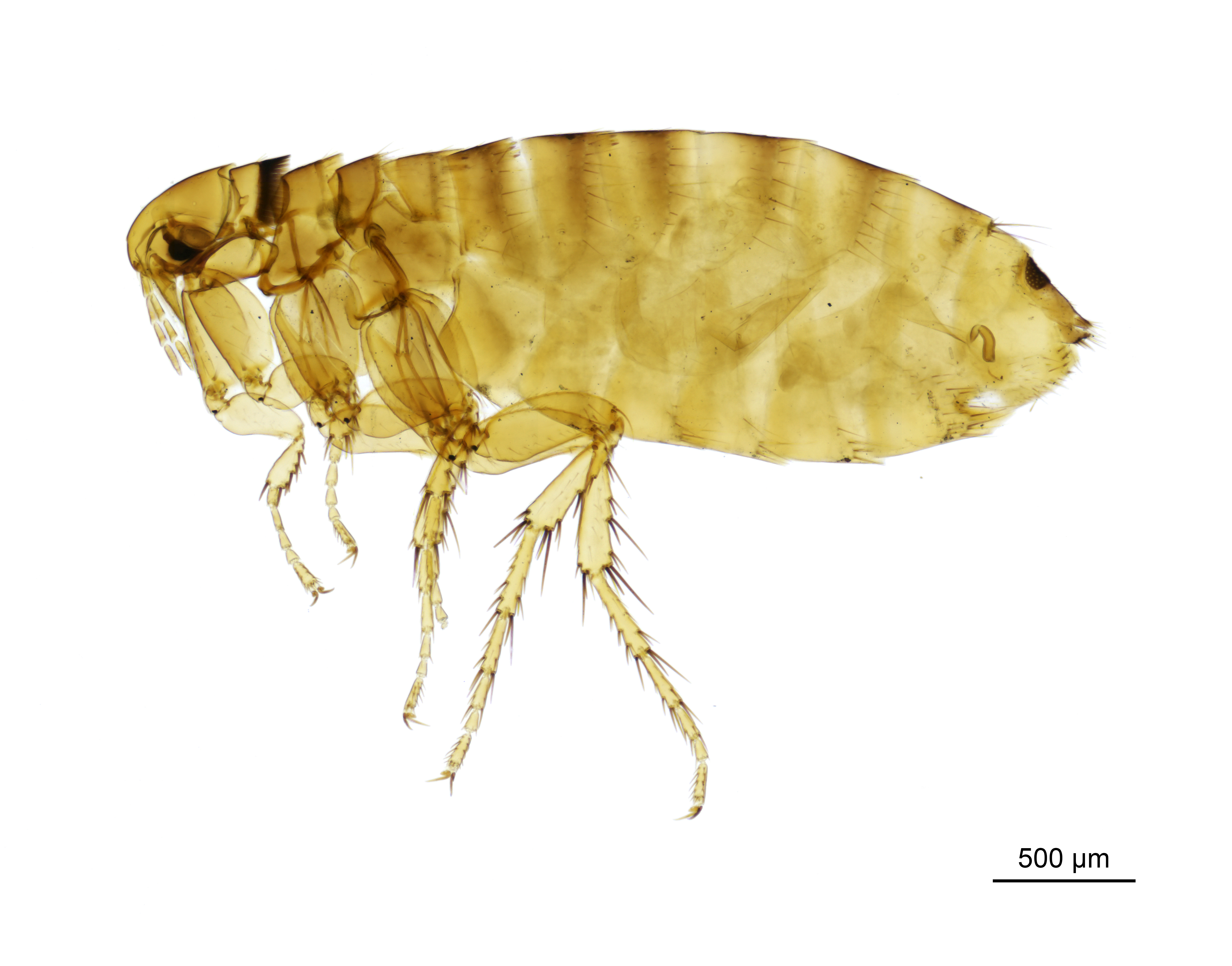
- Female housemartin flea

Scientific classification
- Domain: Eukaryota
- Kingdom: Animalia
- Phylum: Arthropoda
- Class: Insecta
- Order: Siphonaptera
- Family: Ceratophyllidae
- Genus: Ceratophyllus
- Species: C. farreni

Binomial name
- Ceratophyllus farreni Rothschild, 1905

= Ceratophyllus farreni =

Species of flea

Ceratophyllus farreni is a species of flea native to Britain in the family Ceratophyllidae. It was described by Rothschild in 1905.
