= Ceratophyllus lunatus =

Scientific classification
- Domain: Eukaryota
- Kingdom: Animalia
- Phylum: Arthropoda
- Class: Insecta
- Order: Siphonaptera
- Family: Ceratophyllidae
- Genus: Ceratophyllus
- Species: C. lunatus

Binomial name
- Ceratophyllus lunatus Jordan & C. Rothschild, 1920

Species of flea

Ceratophyllus lunatus is a species of flea in the family Ceratophyllidae. It was described by Karl Jordan and Charles Rothschild in 1920.
