= Dasypsyllus araucanus =

Scientific classification
- Domain: Eukaryota
- Kingdom: Animalia
- Phylum: Arthropoda
- Class: Insecta
- Order: Siphonaptera
- Family: Ceratophyllidae
- Genus: Dasypsyllus
- Species: D. araucanus

Binomial name
- Dasypsyllus araucanus Jordan & C. Rothschild, 1920

Species of flea

Dasypsyllus araucanus is a species of flea in the family Ceratophyllidae. It was described by Karl Jordan and Charles Rothschild in 1920.
