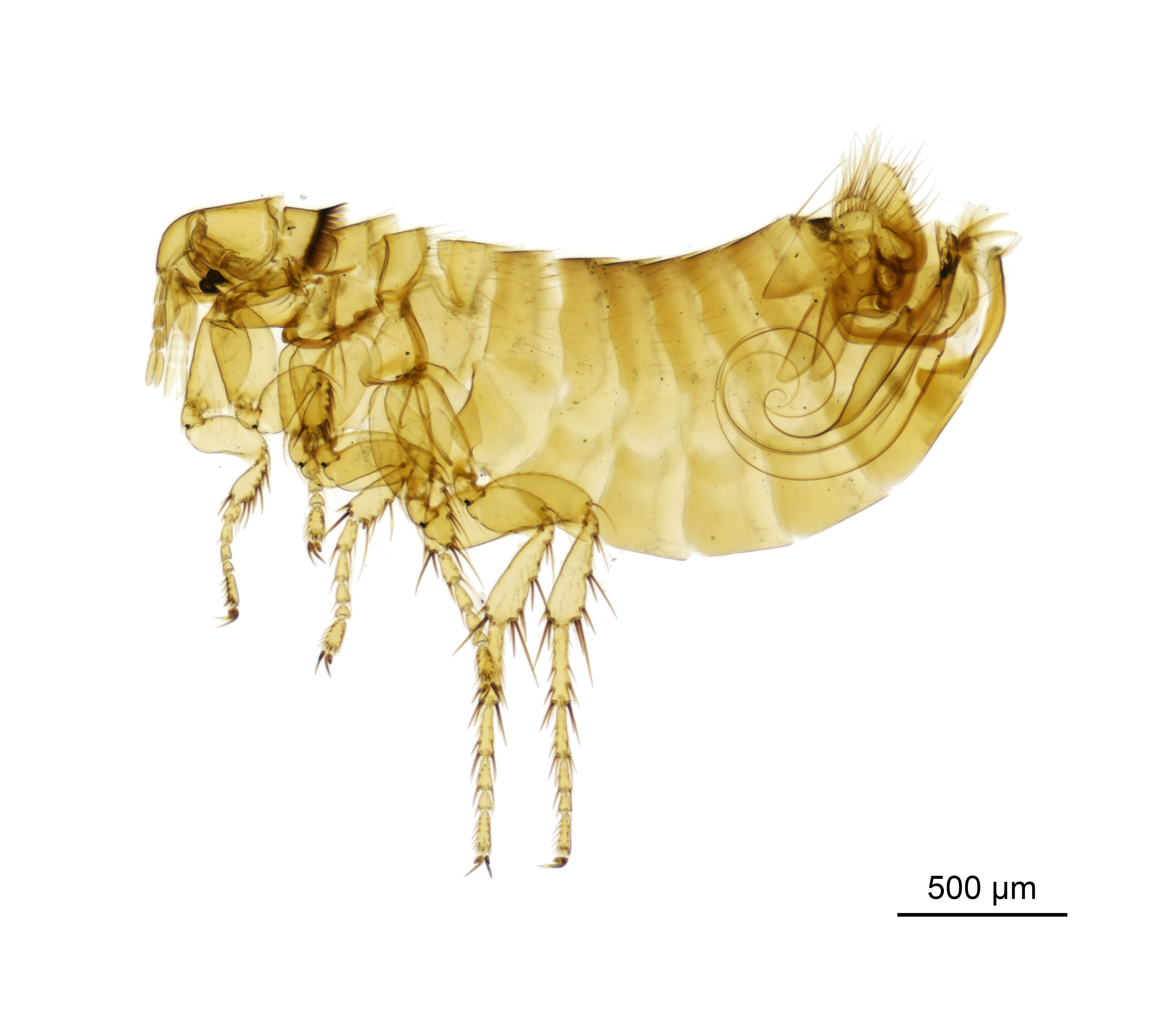
- Male housemartin flea

Scientific classification
- Kingdom: Animalia
- Phylum: Arthropoda
- Clade: Pancrustacea
- Class: Insecta
- Order: Siphonaptera
- Family: Ceratophyllidae
- Genus: Ceratophyllus
- Species: C. rusticus

Binomial name
- Ceratophyllus rusticus Wagner, 1903

= Ceratophyllus rusticus =

Species of flea

Ceratophyllus rusticus is a species of flea in the family Ceratophyllidae. It was described by Wagner in 1903. It is known to feed on house martins.
