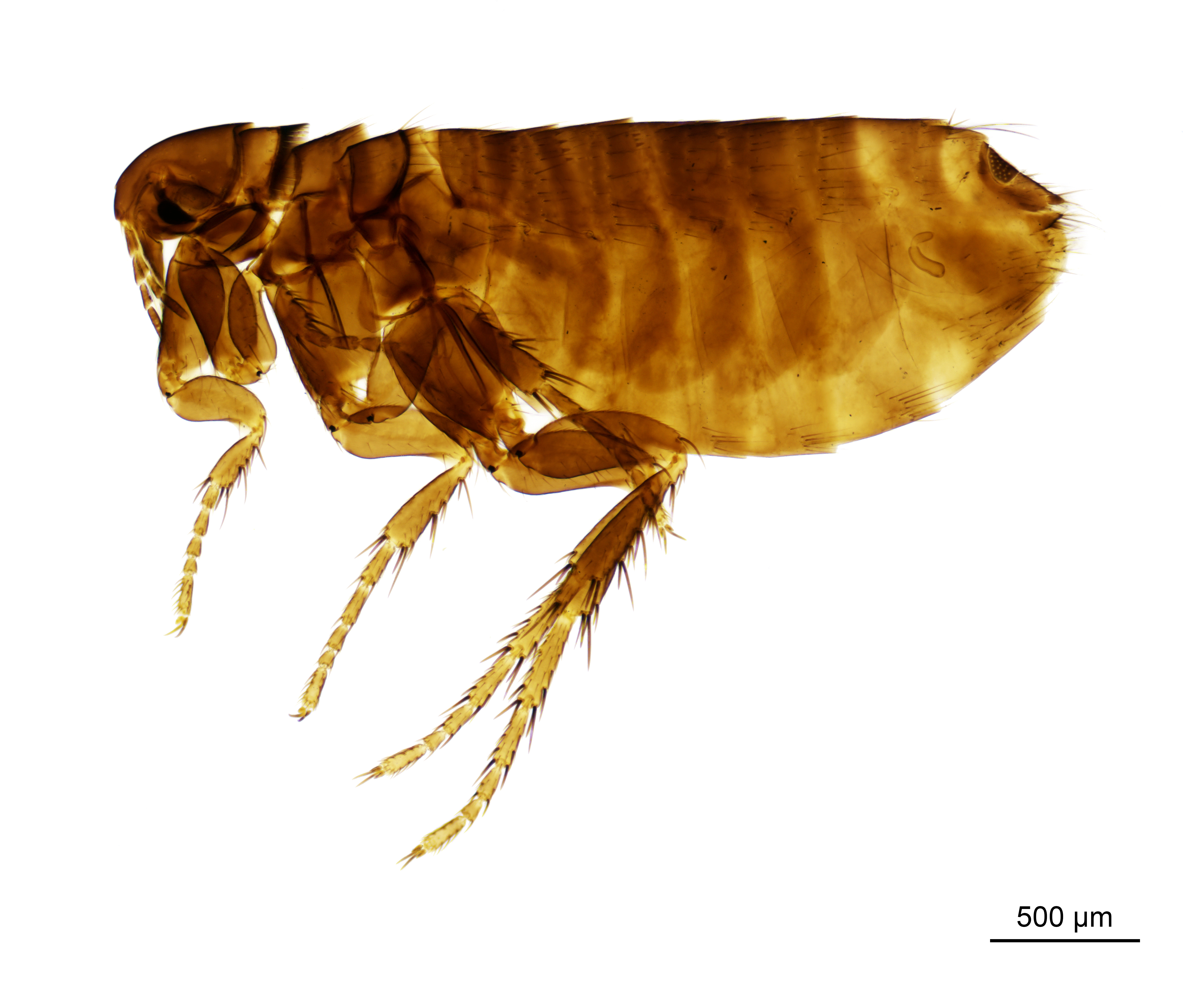
- Female crows nest flea

Scientific classification
- Domain: Eukaryota
- Kingdom: Animalia
- Phylum: Arthropoda
- Class: Insecta
- Order: Siphonaptera
- Family: Ceratophyllidae
- Genus: Ceratophyllus
- Species: C. rossittensis

Binomial name
- Ceratophyllus rossittensis Dampf, 1913

= Ceratophyllus rossittensis =

Species of flea

Ceratophyllus rossittensis is a species of flea in the family Ceratophyllidae. It was described by Dampf in 1913.
