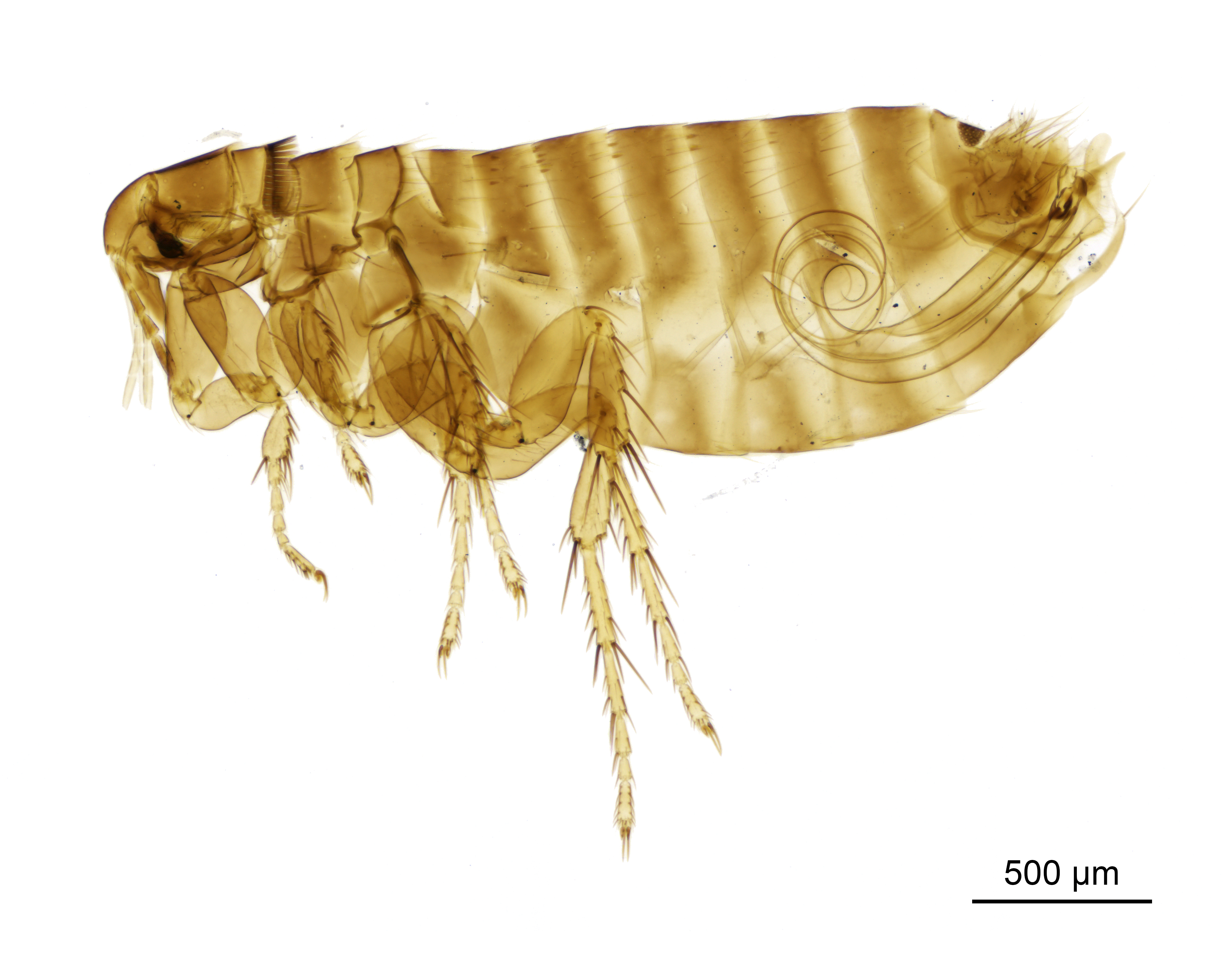
- Male house sparrow/starling nest flea

Scientific classification
- Domain: Eukaryota
- Kingdom: Animalia
- Phylum: Arthropoda
- Class: Insecta
- Order: Siphonaptera
- Family: Ceratophyllidae
- Genus: Ceratophyllus
- Species: C. fringillae

Binomial name
- Ceratophyllus fringillae Walker, 1856

= Ceratophyllus fringillae =

Species of flea

Ceratophyllus fringillae is a species of flea in the family Ceratophyllidae. It was described by Francis Walker in 1856.
