= Dasypsyllus aemulus =

Scientific classification
- Domain: Eukaryota
- Kingdom: Animalia
- Phylum: Arthropoda
- Class: Insecta
- Order: Siphonaptera
- Family: Ceratophyllidae
- Genus: Dasypsyllus
- Species: D. aemulus

Binomial name
- Dasypsyllus aemulus Jordan, 1933

Species of flea

Dasypsyllus aemulus is a species of flea in the family Ceratophyllidae. It was described by Karl Jordan in 1933.
