= Ceratophyllus avicitelli =

Scientific classification
- Domain: Eukaryota
- Kingdom: Animalia
- Phylum: Arthropoda
- Class: Insecta
- Order: Siphonaptera
- Family: Ceratophyllidae
- Genus: Ceratophyllus
- Species: C. avicitelli

Binomial name
- Ceratophyllus avicitelli Ioff, 1946

Species of flea

Ceratophyllus avicitelli is a species of flea in the family Ceratophyllidae. It was described by Ioff in 1946.
