= Ceratophyllus altus =

Scientific classification
- Domain: Eukaryota
- Kingdom: Animalia
- Phylum: Arthropoda
- Class: Insecta
- Order: Siphonaptera
- Family: Ceratophyllidae
- Genus: Ceratophyllus
- Species: C. altus

Binomial name
- Ceratophyllus altus Tipton et Mendez, 1966

Species of flea

Ceratophyllus altus is a species of flea in the family Ceratophyllidae. It was described by Tipton and Mendez in 1966.
