= Ceratophyllus ciliatus =

Scientific classification
- Domain: Eukaryota
- Kingdom: Animalia
- Phylum: Arthropoda
- Class: Insecta
- Order: Siphonaptera
- Family: Ceratophyllidae
- Genus: Ceratophyllus
- Species: C. ciliatus

Binomial name
- Ceratophyllus ciliatus Baker, 1904

Species of flea

Ceratophyllus ciliatus is a species of flea in the family Ceratophyllidae. It was described by Baker in 1904.
