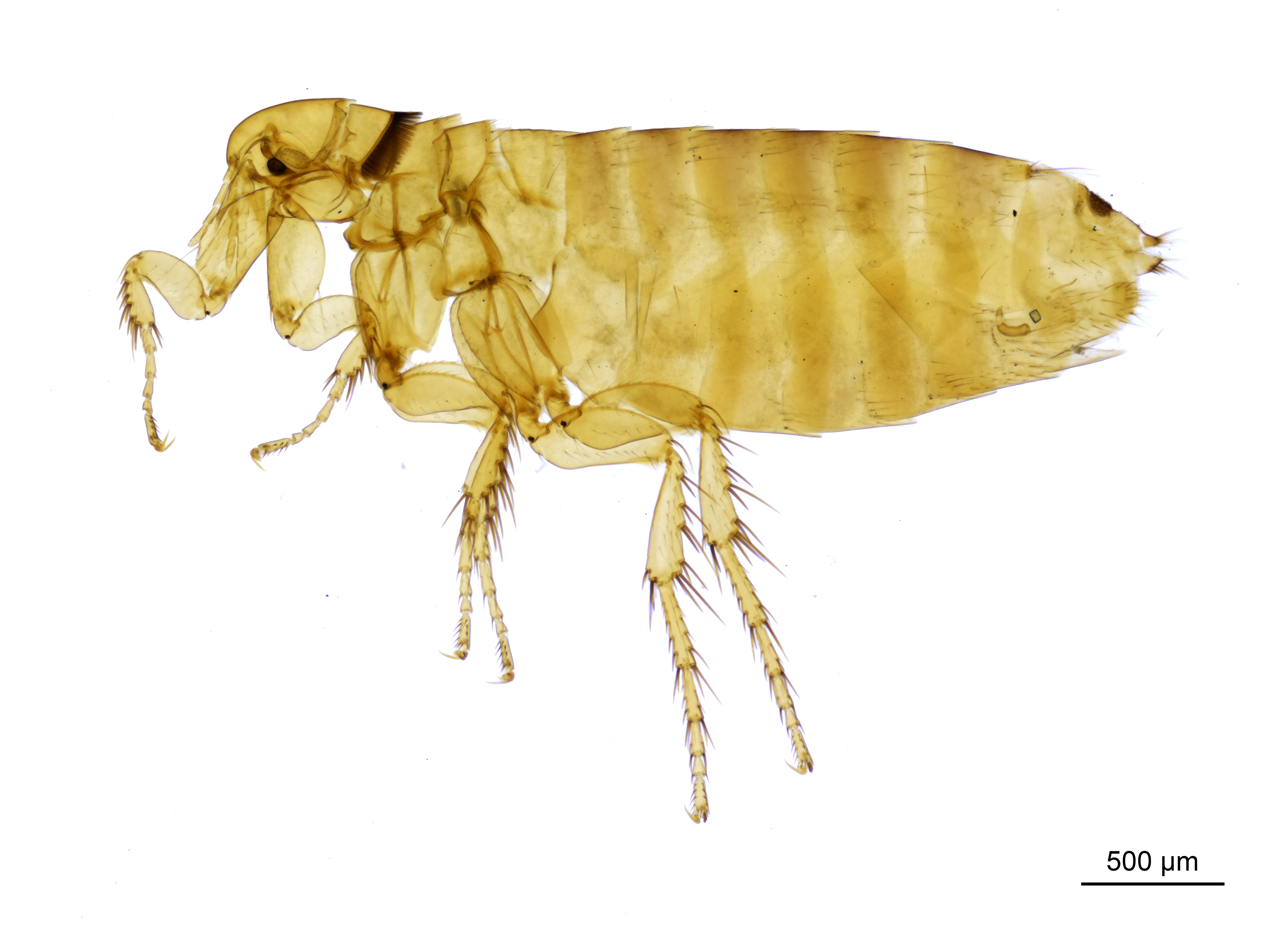
- Female house martin flea

Scientific classification
- Kingdom: Animalia
- Phylum: Arthropoda
- Clade: Pancrustacea
- Class: Insecta
- Order: Siphonaptera
- Family: Ceratophyllidae
- Genus: Ceratophyllus
- Species: C. hirundinis

Binomial name
- Ceratophyllus hirundinis Curtis, 1826

= Ceratophyllus hirundinis =

Species of flea

Ceratophyllus hirundinis is a species of flea in the family Ceratophyllidae. It was described by John Curtis in 1826. It is known to feed on house martins; however, not in nests on sea cliffs.
