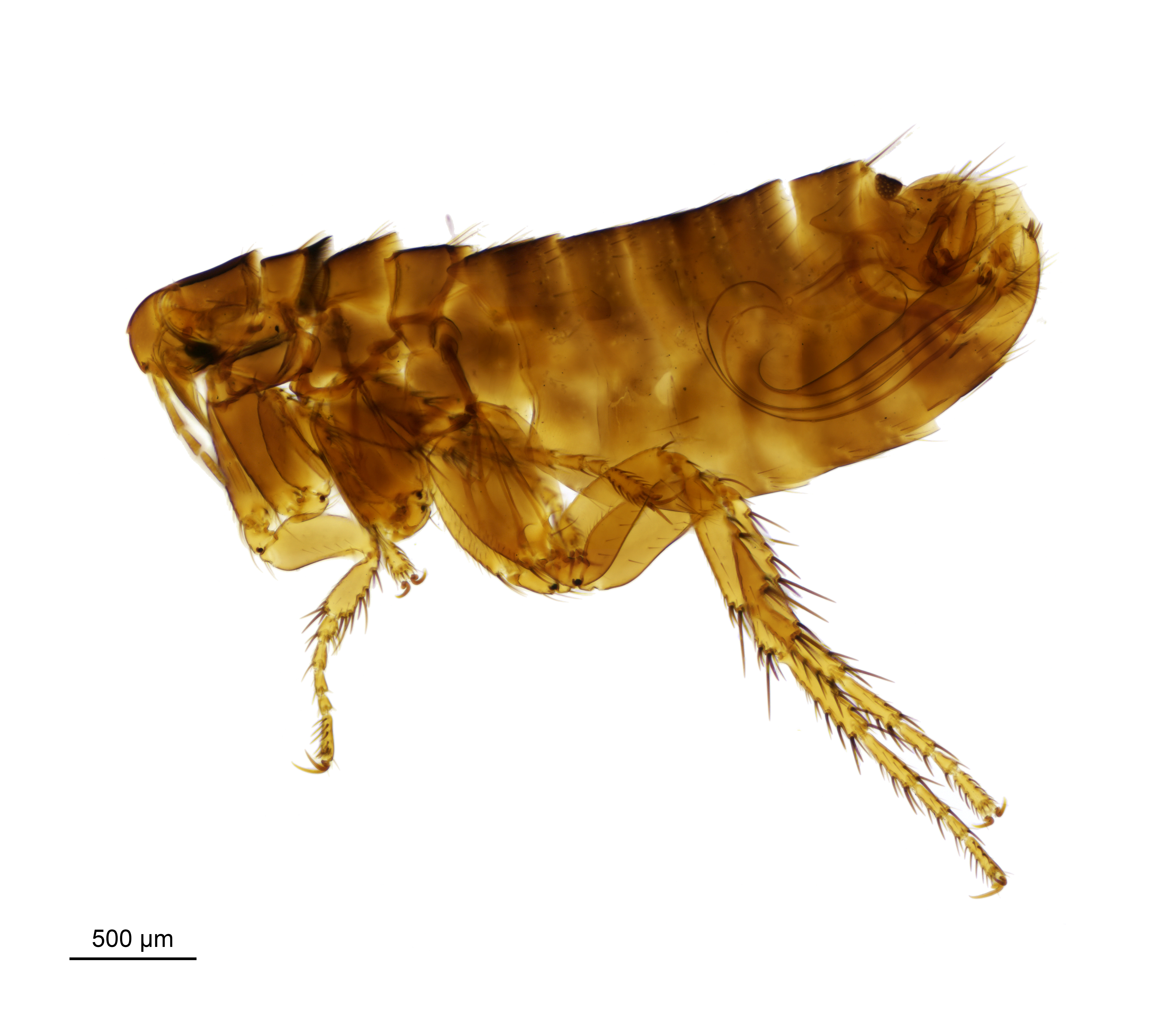
- Male shag's nest flea

Scientific classification
- Domain: Eukaryota
- Kingdom: Animalia
- Phylum: Arthropoda
- Class: Insecta
- Order: Siphonaptera
- Family: Ceratophyllidae
- Genus: Ceratophyllus
- Species: C. chasteli

Binomial name
- Ceratophyllus chasteli Beaucournu, Monnat et Launay, 1982

= Ceratophyllus chasteli =

Species of flea

Ceratophyllus chasteli is a species of flea in the family Ceratophyllidae. It was described by Beaucournu, Monnat and Launay in 1982.
