= Ceratophyllus affinis =

Scientific classification
- Domain: Eukaryota
- Kingdom: Animalia
- Phylum: Arthropoda
- Class: Insecta
- Order: Siphonaptera
- Family: Ceratophyllidae
- Genus: Ceratophyllus
- Species: C. affinis

Binomial name
- Ceratophyllus affinis Nordberg, 1935

Species of flea

Ceratophyllus affinis is a species of flea in the family Ceratophyllidae. It was described by Nordberg in 1935.
