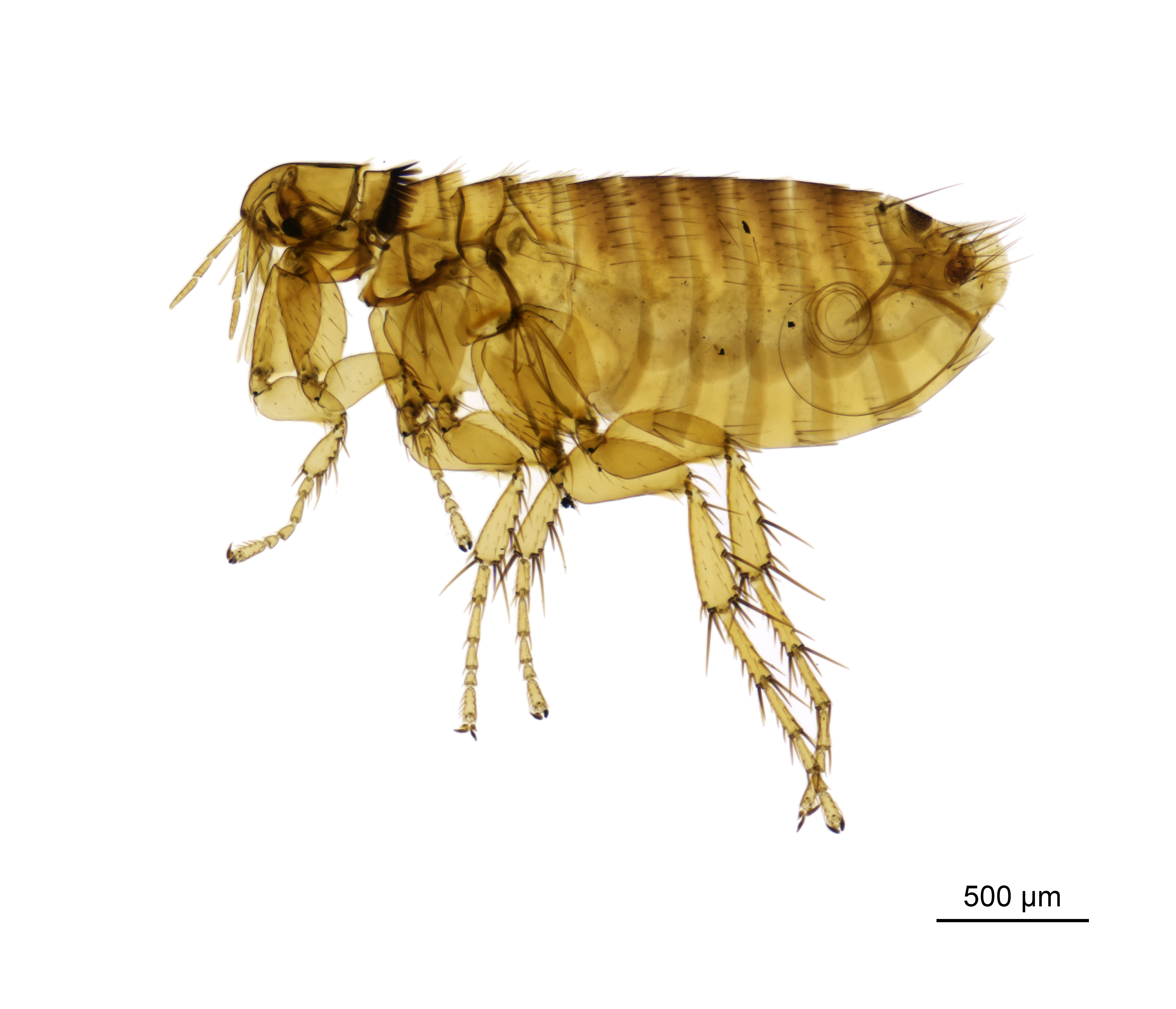
- A rat flea Nosopsyllus fasciatus

Scientific classification
- Kingdom: Animalia
- Phylum: Arthropoda
- Clade: Pancrustacea
- Class: Insecta
- Order: Siphonaptera
- Family: Ceratophyllidae
- Genus: Nosopsyllus
- Species: N. fasciatus

Binomial name
- Nosopsyllus fasciatus (Bosc d'Antic, 1800)

= Nosopsyllus fasciatus =

Species of flea

Nosopsyllus fasciatus, the northern rat flea, is a species of flea found on domestic rats and house mice. Northern rat fleas are external parasites, living by hematophagy off the blood of rodents. N. fasciatus can bite humans, but they are more common parasites of rodents. Since N. fasciatus carries the agents responsible for plague and marine typhus and can bite humans, making the species of one of concern for people. Diseases that can be spread through fleas include the plague and typhus. The rat flea is widespread due to their relationship to rodents and other vertebrates. They can be found co-infecting their host with other parasites.

It is the most widely spread of its genus, having originated in Europe, but has been transported to temperate regions worldwide. The genus, Nosopsyllus, contains sixty-eight taxa, which is then divided into four categories Nosopsyllus, Gerbillophilus, Nosinius, and Penicus.

== Identification ==
N. fasciatus characteristically look similar to other Nosopsyllus species. Like others of this genus, this species is laterally flattened, has well-developed eyes, and a rounded head. N. fasciatus has an elongated body, 3 to 4 mm in length. It has six posterior and six anterior head bristles containing three long and three short bristles. A distinguishing feature is that the dorsal bristle in the posterior row on the head is long but there is a characteristic short bristle immediately ventral to the dorsal bristle.

== Distribution ==
N. fasciatus is endemic to Europe but has a worldwide distribution because of their dependence on rodents and other mammals for survival. The genus, Nosopsyllus, is native to the Palearctic Realm but has spread through human transportation to other regions of the world. The cause of this human-facilitated spread of N. fasciatus was most likely due to the globalization of trade.

Other areas populated by N. fasciatus are the United States, including some islands that have been spread from the mainland. The cause of the spread is due to rats escaping from the mainland to the island through boats. The islands such as the San Miguel Island and Hawaii have been inhabited by rats that carry this species. N. fasciatus is successful in spreading to new areas because it is a generalist and can colonize a new area and adapt easily.

== Anatomy ==
The rat flea has three instar stages in its development. The flea larva has two pharynx chambers, where the posterior one is important for suction. After each moulting period, there is a cost of partial replacement of digestive cells for the new regenerative cells produced during this period. The larva has a two-chambered poorly-developed heart with a dorsal blood vessel.

== Larval Feeding Behaviour ==
Larval N. fasciatus feed on adult fleas through attachment or on injured individuals. In the nest, larval fleas are observed to remain near adults in the debris. Larvae will attach to the posterior end of adults with their mandibles (insect mouthpart). The larva receives nutrients when the adult defecates, which contains blood within the fecal matter. The blood meal is ingested by a sucking action performed by the larvae. If the cuticle of the adult has been injured, the larvae can attack and eat the body of the injured adult. This behaviour categorizes N. fasciatus larvae as semi-predatory and displays opportunist cannibalism behaviour.

== Pathology ==
Though the northern rat flea primarily parasitizes the Norway rat, Rattus norvegicus, it has occasionally been observed feeding on humans and wild rodents. It is a vector for plague and is known to be a host of the rat tapeworm Hymenolepis diminuta in South America, Europe, and Australia. Rodents acts as the primary host for flea species and parasitized rodents account for 25% of all mammals.

=== Effect on Flea ===
Plague transmission causes a blockage in the stomach of N. fasciatus. This blockage is caused by a mass formation in the proventriculus. However, a study revealed that a simultaneous Salmonella infection inhibits the formation of this blockage. However, fleas simultaneously infected by the plague and Salmonella died within 2-3 days due to bloody diarrhea.

=== Effect on Host ===
Parasites are known to reduce the fitness of their host. Therefore, parasitism by fleas can affect the population of the hosts. Studies in gerbil hosts have found that flea infestation reduced Gerbillus dasyurus body mass and immune defences. In common vole hosts, it has also been found that flea infestation reduces body mass and immune defences and also induces an iron deficiency. These effects on the host negatively impact survivability and population density.

=== Disease Vectors ===
Like other fleas, this species plays a role in spreading zoonotic diseases. Rise in rodent outbreaks of zoonotic diseases can spread to humans, like the plague, rickettsioses, and bartonelloses. They can also transmit pathogens that cause tularemia, Q fever, trypanosomiasis, and myxomatosis. The rat flea contributes to the reemergence and cycles of some diseases, as previously mentioned. Infestation is more prevalent during the summer months and drops through the winter months. The highest infestation rate occurs during the summer because of increased activity in the mammal hosts that help spread the fleas and their disease vectors.

== Gallery ==
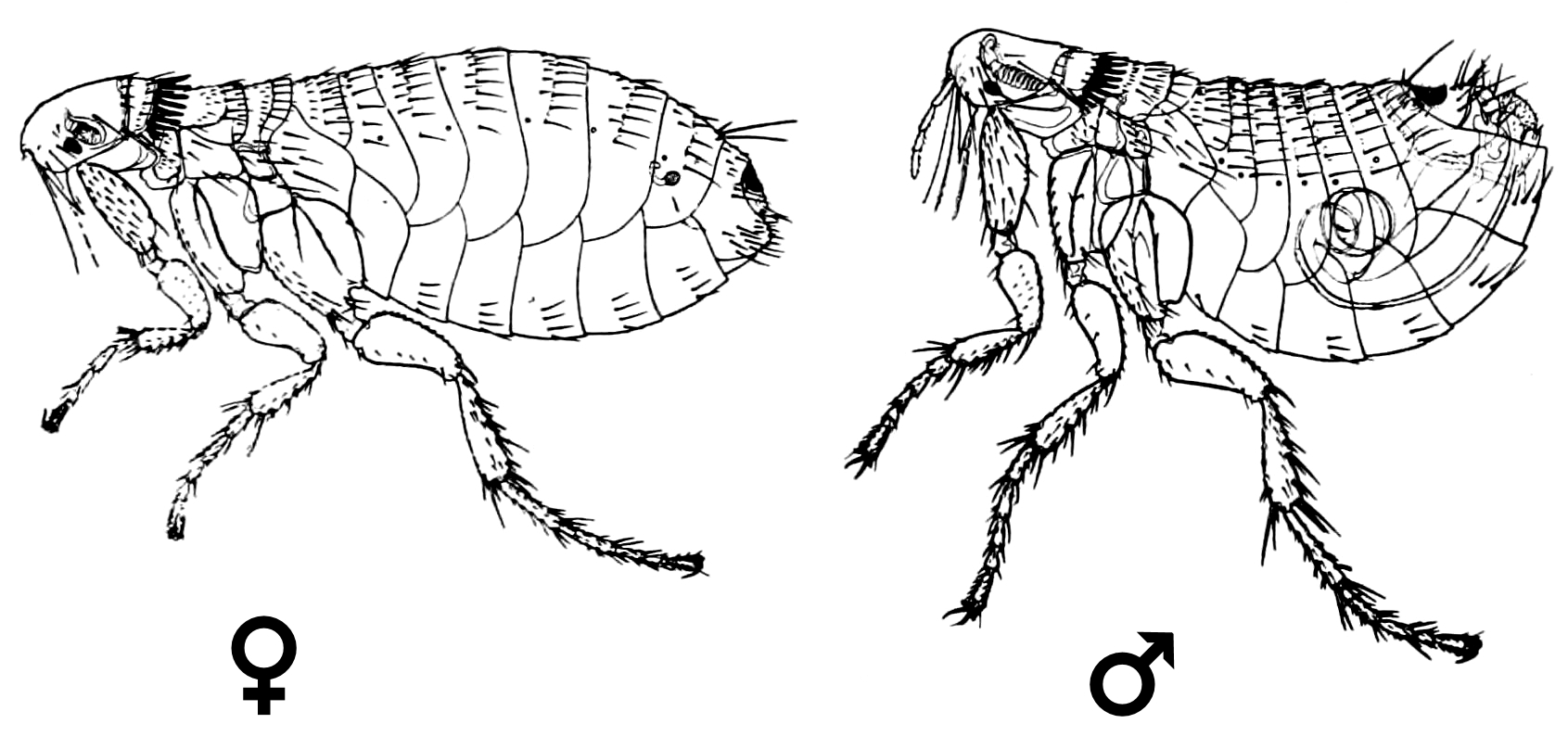
A female and male rat flea N. fasciatus

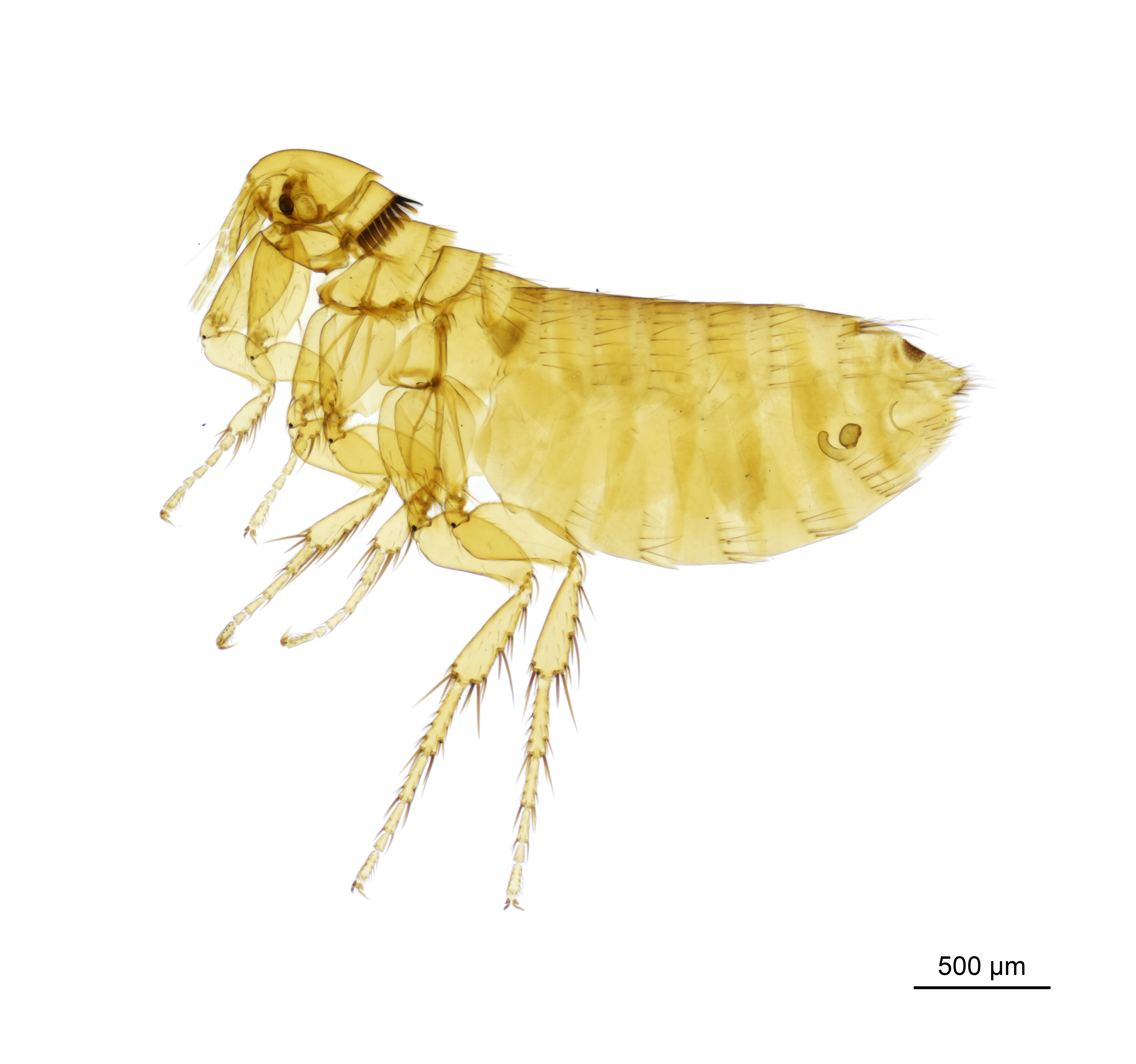
Close-up of a female slide-mounted N. fasciatus
