= Ceratophyllus chutsaensis =

Scientific classification
- Domain: Eukaryota
- Kingdom: Animalia
- Phylum: Arthropoda
- Class: Insecta
- Order: Siphonaptera
- Family: Ceratophyllidae
- Genus: Ceratophyllus
- Species: C. chutsaensis

Binomial name
- Ceratophyllus chutsaensis Lienchu et Houyong, 1962

Species of flea

Ceratophyllus chutsaensis is a species of flea in the family Ceratophyllidae. It was described by Lienchu and Houyong in 1962.
