= Ceratophyllus nanshanensis =

Scientific classification
- Domain: Eukaryota
- Kingdom: Animalia
- Phylum: Arthropoda
- Class: Insecta
- Order: Siphonaptera
- Family: Ceratophyllidae
- Genus: Ceratophyllus
- Species: C. nanshanensis

Binomial name
- Ceratophyllus nanshanensis Liyuen, Fenchun et Chuan, 1980

Species of flea

Ceratophyllus nanshanensis is a species of flea in the family Ceratophyllidae. It was described by Liyuen, Fenchun and Chuan in 1980.
