= Ceratophyllus niger =

Scientific classification
- Domain: Eukaryota
- Kingdom: Animalia
- Phylum: Arthropoda
- Class: Insecta
- Order: Siphonaptera
- Family: Ceratophyllidae
- Genus: Ceratophyllus
- Species: C. niger

Binomial name
- Ceratophyllus niger Fox, 1908

Species of flea

Ceratophyllus niger, also known as the western chicken flea or the black hen flea, is an ectoparasite of birds. It is a member of the family Ceratophyllidae and was described by Fox in 1908.
