= Ceratophyllus qinghaiensis =

Scientific classification
- Domain: Eukaryota
- Kingdom: Animalia
- Phylum: Arthropoda
- Class: Insecta
- Order: Siphonaptera
- Family: Ceratophyllidae
- Genus: Ceratophyllus
- Species: C. qinghaiensis

Binomial name
- Ceratophyllus qinghaiensis Guangdeng et Liming, 1985

Species of flea

Ceratophyllus qinghaiensis is a species of flea in the family Ceratophyllidae. It was described by Guangdeng and Liming in 1985.
