= Ceratophyllus scopulorum =

Scientific classification
- Domain: Eukaryota
- Kingdom: Animalia
- Phylum: Arthropoda
- Class: Insecta
- Order: Siphonaptera
- Family: Ceratophyllidae
- Genus: Ceratophyllus
- Species: C. scopulorum

Binomial name
- Ceratophyllus scopulorum Holland, 1952

Species of flea

Ceratophyllus scopulorum is a species of flea in the family Ceratophyllidae. It was described by George P. Holland in 1952.
