= Ceratophyllus liae =

Scientific classification
- Kingdom: Animalia
- Phylum: Arthropoda
- Class: Insecta
- Order: Siphonaptera
- Family: Ceratophyllidae
- Genus: Ceratophyllus
- Species: C. liae

Binomial name
- Ceratophyllus liae Wenzhen et Chao, 1990

Species of flea

Ceratophyllus liae is a species of flea in the family Ceratophyllidae. It was described by Wenzhen and Chao in 1990.
