= Ceratophyllus petrochelidoni =

Scientific classification
- Domain: Eukaryota
- Kingdom: Animalia
- Phylum: Arthropoda
- Class: Insecta
- Order: Siphonaptera
- Family: Ceratophyllidae
- Genus: Ceratophyllus
- Species: C. petrochelidoni

Binomial name
- Ceratophyllus petrochelidoni Wagner, 1936

Species of flea

Ceratophyllus petrochelidoni is a species of flea in the family Ceratophyllidae. It was described by Wagner in 1936.
