= Ceratophyllus sclerapicalis =

Scientific classification
- Domain: Eukaryota
- Kingdom: Animalia
- Phylum: Arthropoda
- Class: Insecta
- Order: Siphonaptera
- Family: Ceratophyllidae
- Genus: Ceratophyllus
- Species: C. sclerapicalis

Binomial name
- Ceratophyllus sclerapicalis Liyuen, Wenching et Chiying, 1974

Species of flea

Ceratophyllus sclerapicalis is a species of flea in the family Ceratophyllidae. It was described by Liyuen, Wenching and Chiying in 1974.
