= Amaradix euphorbi =

Scientific classification
- Domain: Eukaryota
- Kingdom: Animalia
- Phylum: Arthropoda
- Class: Insecta
- Order: Siphonaptera
- Family: Ceratophyllidae
- Genus: Amaradix
- Species: A. euphorbi

Binomial name
- Amaradix euphorbi (Rothschild, 1905)

Species of flea

Amaradix euphorbi is a species of flea in the family Ceratophyllidae. It was described by Rothschild in 1905.
