= Ceratophyllus caliotes =

Scientific classification
- Domain: Eukaryota
- Kingdom: Animalia
- Phylum: Arthropoda
- Class: Insecta
- Order: Siphonaptera
- Family: Ceratophyllidae
- Genus: Ceratophyllus
- Species: C. caliotes

Binomial name
- Ceratophyllus caliotes Jordan, 1937

Species of flea

Ceratophyllus caliotes is a species of flea in the family Ceratophyllidae. It was described by Karl Jordan in 1937.
