= Ceratophyllus adustus =

Scientific classification
- Domain: Eukaryota
- Kingdom: Animalia
- Phylum: Arthropoda
- Class: Insecta
- Order: Siphonaptera
- Family: Ceratophyllidae
- Genus: Ceratophyllus
- Species: C. adustus

Binomial name
- Ceratophyllus adustus Jordan, 1932

Species of flea

Ceratophyllus adustus is a species of flea in the family Ceratophyllidae. It was described by Karl Jordan in 1932.
