= Dasypsyllus lasius =

Scientific classification
- Domain: Eukaryota
- Kingdom: Animalia
- Phylum: Arthropoda
- Class: Insecta
- Order: Siphonaptera
- Family: Ceratophyllidae
- Genus: Dasypsyllus
- Species: D. lasius

Binomial name
- Dasypsyllus lasius Rothschild, 1909

Species of flea

Dasypsyllus lasius is a species of flea in the family Ceratophyllidae. It was described by Rothschild in 1909.
