= Ceratophyllus breviprojectus =

Scientific classification
- Domain: Eukaryota
- Kingdom: Animalia
- Phylum: Arthropoda
- Class: Insecta
- Order: Siphonaptera
- Family: Ceratophyllidae
- Genus: Ceratophyllus
- Species: C. breviprojectus

Binomial name
- Ceratophyllus breviprojectus Liu, Wu et Wu, 1966

Species of flea

Ceratophyllus breviprojectus is a species of flea in the family Ceratophyllidae. It was described by Liu, Wu and Wu in 1966.
