= Megabot =

Megabot may refer to:

- MegaBots Inc., American company that created giant robots
- Megabot, classification of robot in online vehicular combat game Robocraft
- Megabot, character in 2012 Philippine television series E-Boy
- Megabot, stage name of Matthew Garrett Baker, brother and collaborator of musician Zacky Vengeance

== See also ==
- Medabots, a Japanese role-playing video game franchise
- Megabat, a family of fruit bat
- Megabothris, a genus of flea
- Megabyte (disambiguation)
- Mega-D botnet, once responsible for sending 32% of spam worldwide
- Mega Man (character), a fictional robot
- Megatron, a fictional robot
