= Ceratophyllus calderwoodi =

Scientific classification
- Domain: Eukaryota
- Kingdom: Animalia
- Phylum: Arthropoda
- Class: Insecta
- Order: Siphonaptera
- Family: Ceratophyllidae
- Genus: Ceratophyllus
- Species: C. calderwoodi

Binomial name
- Ceratophyllus calderwoodi Holland, 1979

Species of flea

Ceratophyllus calderwoodi is a species of flea in the family Ceratophyllidae. It was described by George P. Holland in 1979.
