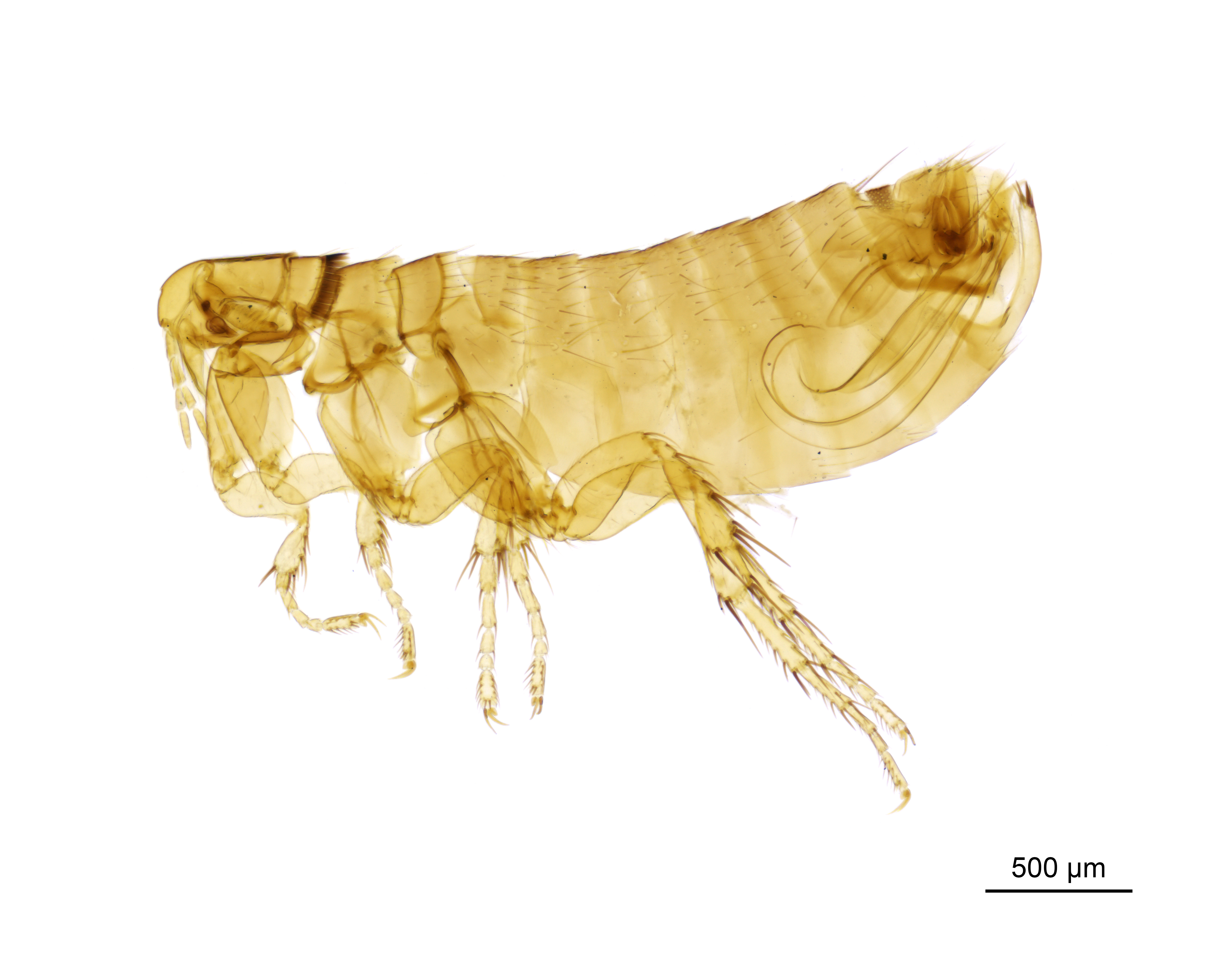
- Male feral pigeon nest flea

Scientific classification
- Kingdom: Animalia
- Phylum: Arthropoda
- Clade: Pancrustacea
- Class: Insecta
- Order: Siphonaptera
- Family: Ceratophyllidae
- Genus: Ceratophyllus
- Species: C. columbae

Binomial name
- Ceratophyllus columbae Gervais, 1844

= Ceratophyllus columbae =

Species of flea

Ceratophyllus columbae is a species of flea in the family Ceratophyllidae. It was described by Gervais in 1844.
