= Amaradix bitterrootensis =

Scientific classification
- Domain: Eukaryota
- Kingdom: Animalia
- Phylum: Arthropoda
- Class: Insecta
- Order: Siphonaptera
- Family: Ceratophyllidae
- Genus: Amaradix
- Species: A. bitterrootensis

Binomial name
- Amaradix bitterrootensis (Dunn, 1923)

Species of flea

Amaradix bitterrootensis is a species of flea in the family Ceratophyllidae. It was described by Emmett Reid Dunn in 1923.
