= Ceratophyllus wui =

Scientific classification
- Domain: Eukaryota
- Kingdom: Animalia
- Phylum: Arthropoda
- Class: Insecta
- Order: Siphonaptera
- Family: Ceratophyllidae
- Genus: Ceratophyllus
- Species: C. wui

Binomial name
- Ceratophyllus wui Beaucournu, Wang et Liu, 1996

Species of flea

Ceratophyllus wui is a species of flea in the family Ceratophyllidae. It was described by Wang and Liu in 1996.
