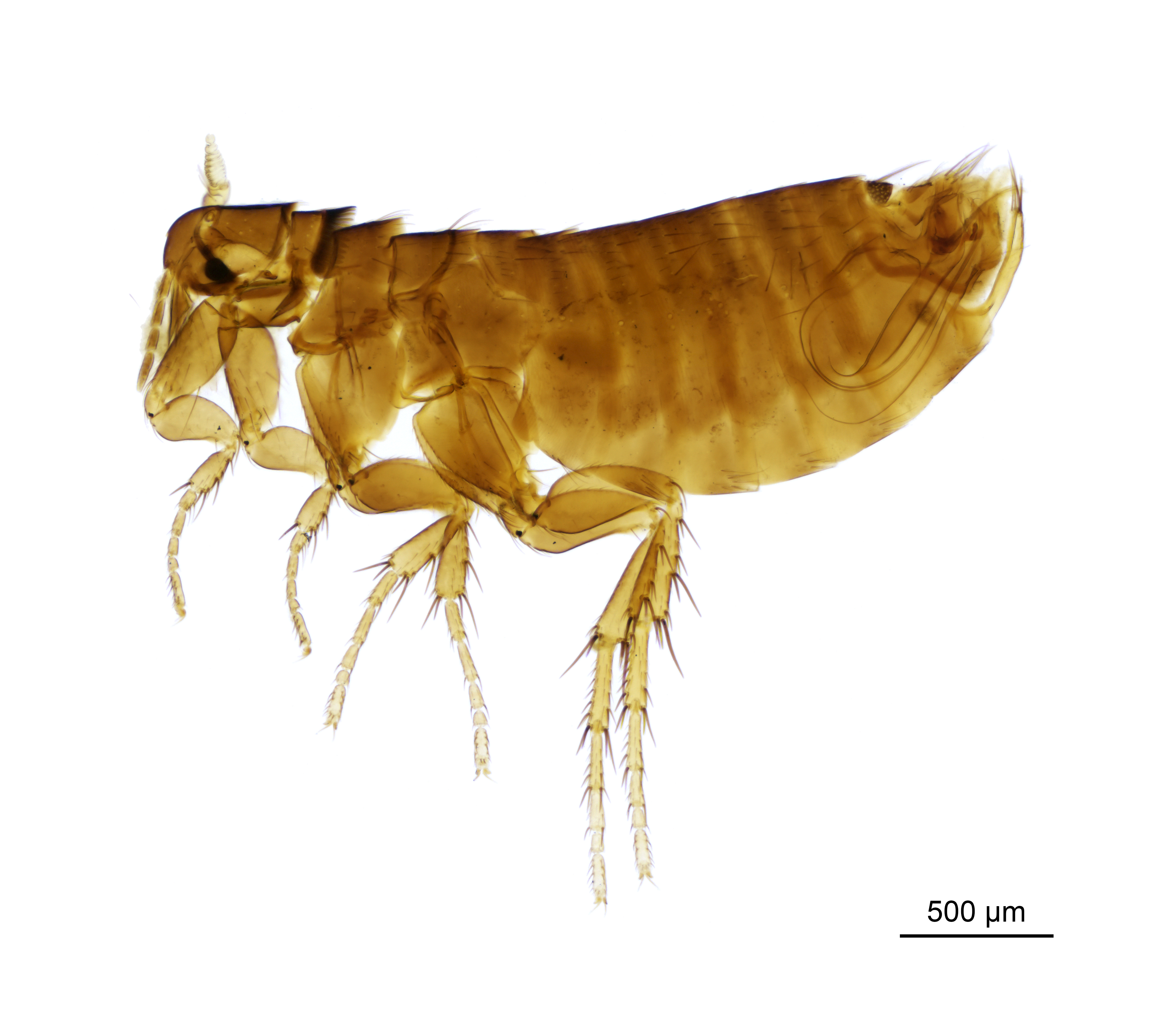
- Male ground nesting bird flea

Scientific classification
- Domain: Eukaryota
- Kingdom: Animalia
- Phylum: Arthropoda
- Class: Insecta
- Order: Siphonaptera
- Family: Ceratophyllidae
- Genus: Ceratophyllus
- Species: C. garei

Binomial name
- Ceratophyllus garei Rothschild, 1902

= Ceratophyllus garei =

Species of flea

Ceratophyllus garei, the duck flea, is a species of flea in the family Ceratophyllidae. It was described by Rothschild in 1902.
