= Dasypsyllus stejnegeri =

Scientific classification
- Domain: Eukaryota
- Kingdom: Animalia
- Phylum: Arthropoda
- Class: Insecta
- Order: Siphonaptera
- Family: Ceratophyllidae
- Genus: Dasypsyllus
- Species: D. stejnegeri

Binomial name
- Dasypsyllus stejnegeri Jordan, 1929

Species of flea

Dasypsyllus stejnegeri is a species of flea in the family Ceratophyllidae. It was described by Karl Jordan in 1929.
