= Ceratophyllus coahuilensis =

Scientific classification
- Domain: Eukaryota
- Kingdom: Animalia
- Phylum: Arthropoda
- Class: Insecta
- Order: Siphonaptera
- Family: Ceratophyllidae
- Genus: Ceratophyllus
- Species: C. coahuilensis

Binomial name
- Ceratophyllus coahuilensis Eads, 1956

Species of flea

Ceratophyllus coahuilensis is a species of flea in the family Ceratophyllidae. It was described by Eads in 1956.
