= Ceratophyllus olsufjevi =

Scientific classification
- Domain: Eukaryota
- Kingdom: Animalia
- Phylum: Arthropoda
- Class: Insecta
- Order: Siphonaptera
- Family: Ceratophyllidae
- Genus: Ceratophyllus
- Species: C. olsufjevi

Binomial name
- Ceratophyllus olsufjevi Scalon et Violovich, 1961

Species of flea

Ceratophyllus olsufjevi is a species of flea in the family Ceratophyllidae. It was described by Scalon and Violovich in 1961.
