= Ceratophyllus titicacensis =

Scientific classification
- Domain: Eukaryota
- Kingdom: Animalia
- Phylum: Arthropoda
- Class: Insecta
- Order: Siphonaptera
- Family: Ceratophyllidae
- Genus: Ceratophyllus
- Species: C. titicacensis

Binomial name
- Ceratophyllus titicacensis Smit, 1978

Species of flea

Ceratophyllus titicacensis is a species of flea in the family Ceratophyllidae. It was described by Smit in 1978.
