= Ceratophyllus picatilis =

Scientific classification
- Domain: Eukaryota
- Kingdom: Animalia
- Phylum: Arthropoda
- Class: Insecta
- Order: Siphonaptera
- Family: Ceratophyllidae
- Genus: Ceratophyllus
- Species: C. picatilis

Binomial name
- Ceratophyllus picatilis Liyun et Wenzhen, 1988

Species of flea

Ceratophyllus picatilis is a species of flea in the family Ceratophyllidae. It was described by Liyun and Wenzhen in 1988.
