= Ceratophyllus spinosus =

Scientific classification
- Domain: Eukaryota
- Kingdom: Animalia
- Phylum: Arthropoda
- Class: Insecta
- Order: Siphonaptera
- Family: Ceratophyllidae
- Genus: Ceratophyllus
- Species: C. spinosus

Binomial name
- Ceratophyllus spinosus Wagner, 1903

Species of flea

Ceratophyllus spinosus is a species of flea in the family Ceratophyllidae. It was described by Wagner in 1903.
