= Ceratophyllus frigoris =

Scientific classification
- Domain: Eukaryota
- Kingdom: Animalia
- Phylum: Arthropoda
- Class: Insecta
- Order: Siphonaptera
- Family: Ceratophyllidae
- Genus: Ceratophyllus
- Species: C. frigoris

Binomial name
- Ceratophyllus frigoris Darskaya, 1950

Species of flea

Ceratophyllus frigoris is a species of flea in the family Ceratophyllidae. It was described by Darskaya in 1950.
