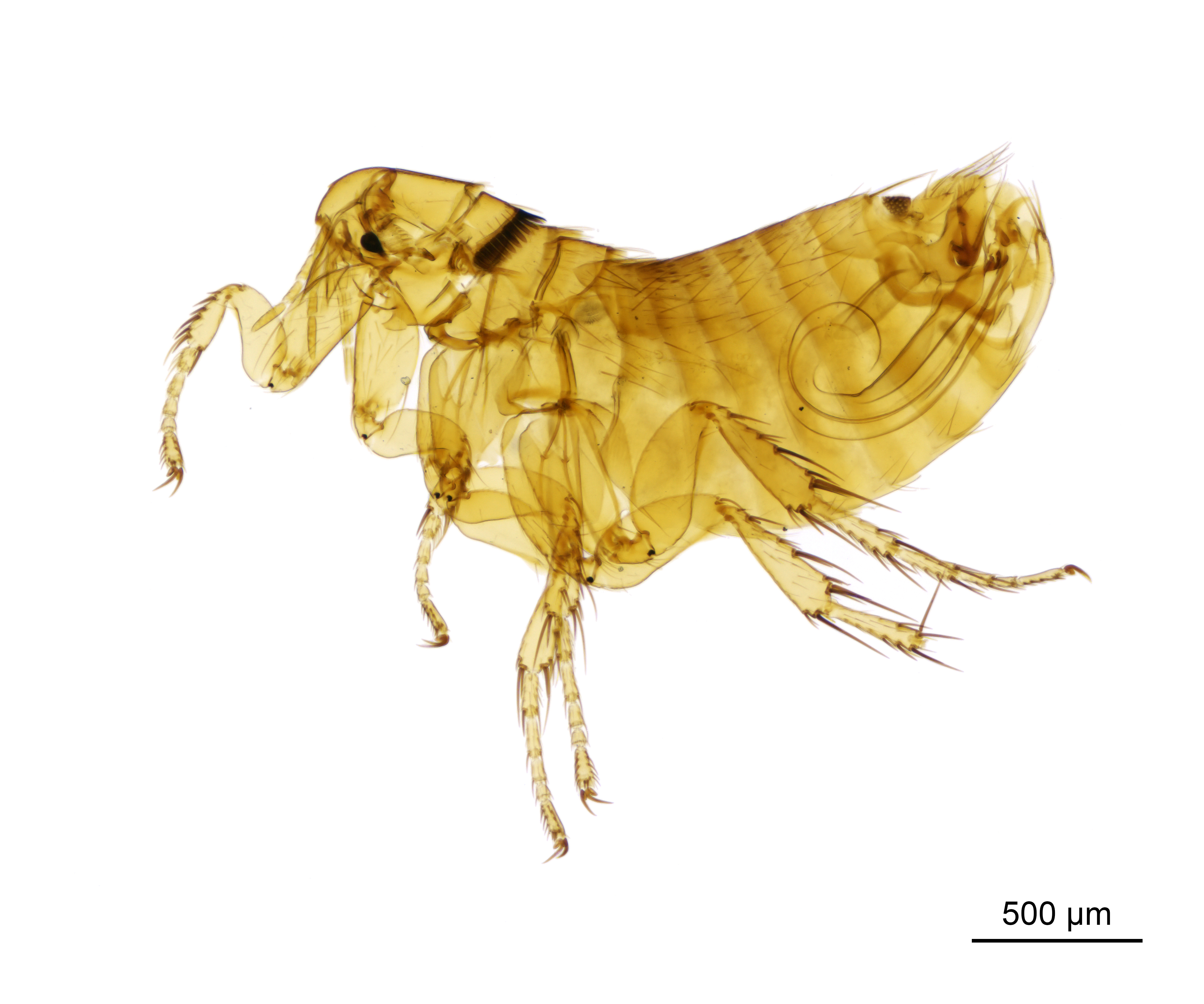
- Male manx shearwater flea

Scientific classification
- Domain: Eukaryota
- Kingdom: Animalia
- Phylum: Arthropoda
- Class: Insecta
- Order: Siphonaptera
- Family: Ceratophyllidae
- Genus: Ceratophyllus
- Species: C. fionnus

Binomial name
- Ceratophyllus fionnus Usher, 1968

= Ceratophyllus fionnus =

Species of flea

Ceratophyllus fionnus is a species of flea in the family Ceratophyllidae. It was described by Usher in 1968.
