= Ceratophyllus igii =

Scientific classification
- Domain: Eukaryota
- Kingdom: Animalia
- Phylum: Arthropoda
- Class: Insecta
- Order: Siphonaptera
- Family: Ceratophyllidae
- Genus: Ceratophyllus
- Species: C. igii

Binomial name
- Ceratophyllus igii Darskaya et Shiranovich, 1971

Species of flea

Ceratophyllus igii is a species of flea in the family Ceratophyllidae. It was described by Darskaya and Shiranovich in 1971.
