= Ceratophyllus maculatus =

Scientific classification
- Kingdom: Animalia
- Phylum: Arthropoda
- Clade: Pancrustacea
- Class: Insecta
- Order: Siphonaptera
- Family: Ceratophyllidae
- Genus: Ceratophyllus
- Species: C. maculatus

Binomial name
- Ceratophyllus maculatus Wagner, 1927

Species of flea

Ceratophyllus maculatus is a species of flea in the family Ceratophyllidae. It was described by Wagner in 1927.
