= Ceratophyllus hagoromo =

Scientific classification
- Domain: Eukaryota
- Kingdom: Animalia
- Phylum: Arthropoda
- Class: Insecta
- Order: Siphonaptera
- Family: Ceratophyllidae
- Genus: Ceratophyllus
- Species: C. hagoromo

Binomial name
- Ceratophyllus hagoromo Jameson et Sakaguti, 1959

Species of flea

Ceratophyllus hagoromo is a species of flea in the family Ceratophyllidae. It was described by Jameson and Sakaguti in 1959.
