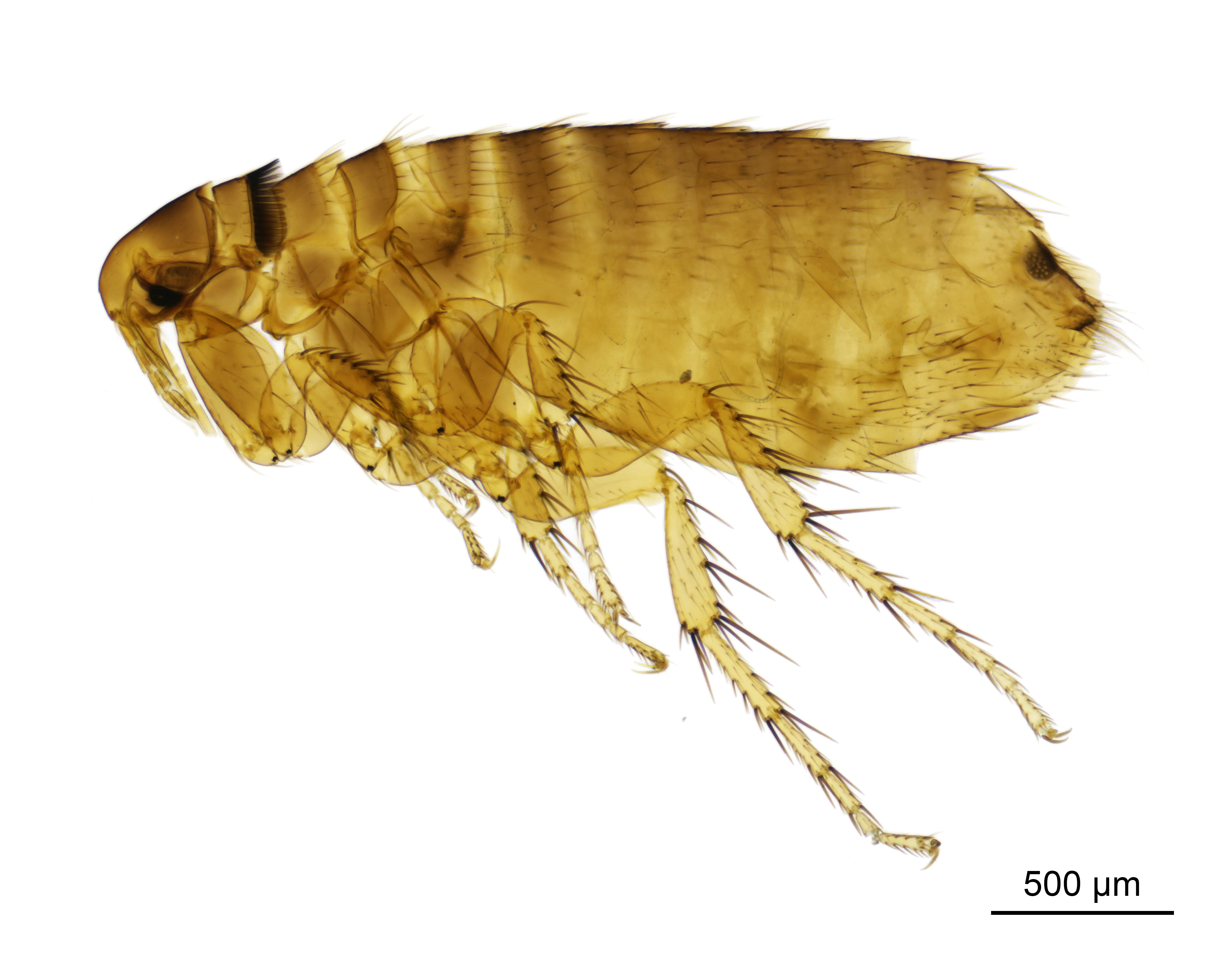
- Female sandmartin flea

Scientific classification
- Domain: Eukaryota
- Kingdom: Animalia
- Phylum: Arthropoda
- Class: Insecta
- Order: Siphonaptera
- Family: Ceratophyllidae
- Genus: Ceratophyllus
- Species: C. styx

Binomial name
- Ceratophyllus styx Rothschild, 1900

= Ceratophyllus styx =

Species of flea

Ceratophyllus styx is a species of flea in the family Ceratophyllidae. It was described by Rothschild in 1900.
