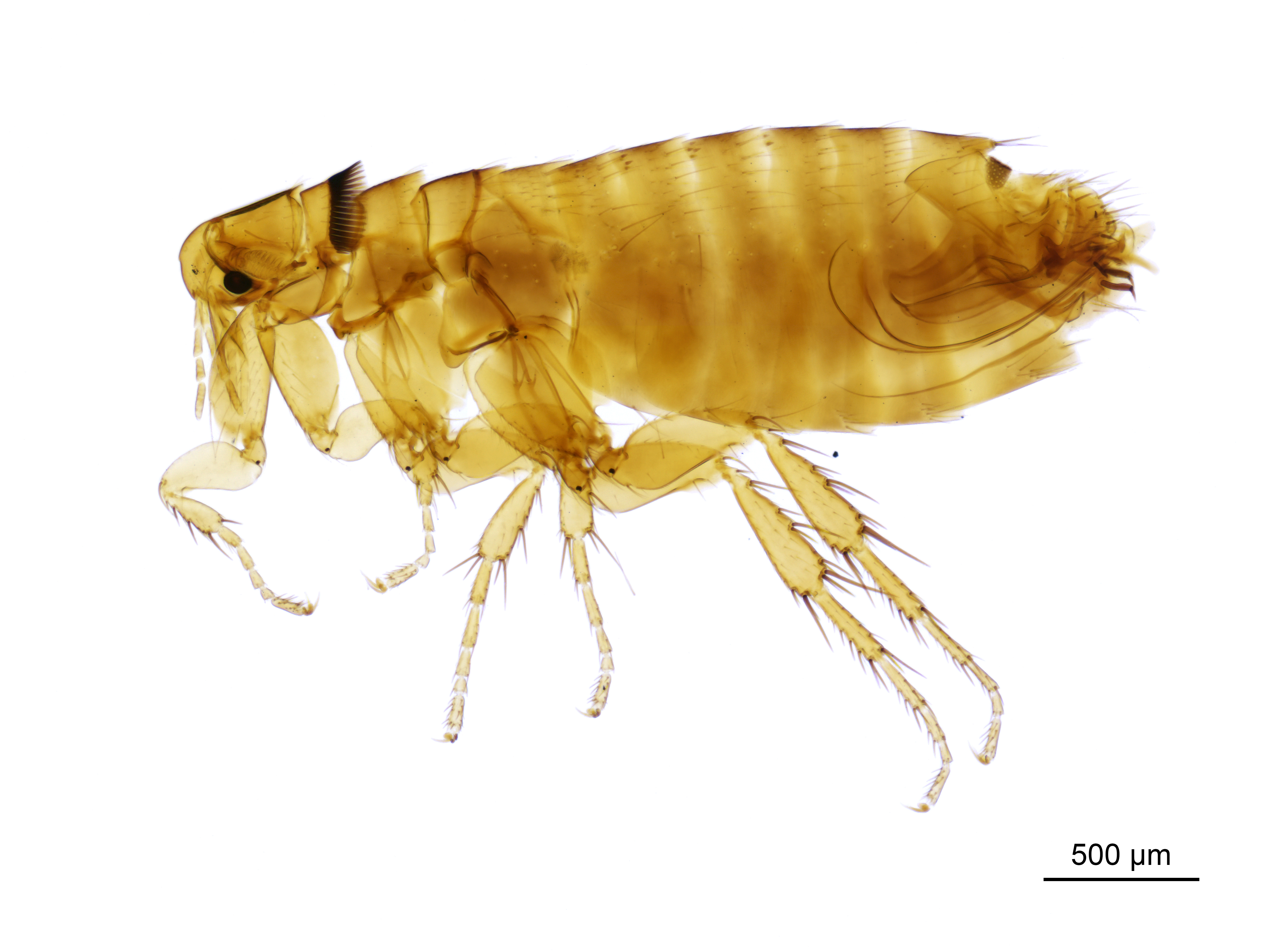
- Male moorhen flea

Scientific classification
- Kingdom: Animalia
- Phylum: Arthropoda
- Clade: Pancrustacea
- Class: Insecta
- Order: Siphonaptera
- Family: Ceratophyllidae
- Genus: Dasypsyllus
- Species: D. gallinulae

Binomial name
- Dasypsyllus gallinulae (Dale, 1878)

= Moorhen flea =

Species of flea

The moorhen flea (Dasypsyllus gallinulae) is a flea originating from South America. It is now globally widespread. It is a large flea, easily identified because the male has two heavy horn-like spines on one of the genital flaps, and the female has a deep "bite" on the seventh sternite.

It is found in bird nests, and is more likely to be found on the bird's body than, say, the chicken flea, which is normally found in the nest. The moorhen flea's many hosts include the common moorhen, Eurasian woodcock, grouse, European robin, goldcrest, willow tit, Eurasian treecreeper and blackbirds.
