= Oropsylla =

Scientific classification
- Kingdom: Animalia
- Phylum: Arthropoda
- Class: Insecta
- Order: Siphonaptera
- Family: Ceratophyllidae
- Subfamily: Ceratophyllinae
- Genus: Oropsylla; Wagner & Ioff, 1926

Genus of fleas

Oropsylla is a genus of fleas, most of which are ectoparasites of rodents and other mammals.

== Species ==
- Oropsylla alaskensis
- Oropsylla arctomys
- Oropsylla bruneri
- Oropsylla eatoni
- Oropsylla hirsuta
- Oropsylla idahoensis
- Oropsylla ilovaiskii
- Oropsylla labis
- Oropsylla montana, this flea is of note for its role in transmitting Yersinia pestis to native rodents.
- Oropsylla oregonensis
- Oropsylla rupestris
- Oropsylla silantiewi
- Oropsylla tapina
- Oropsylla tuberculata
- Oropsylla washingtonensis
