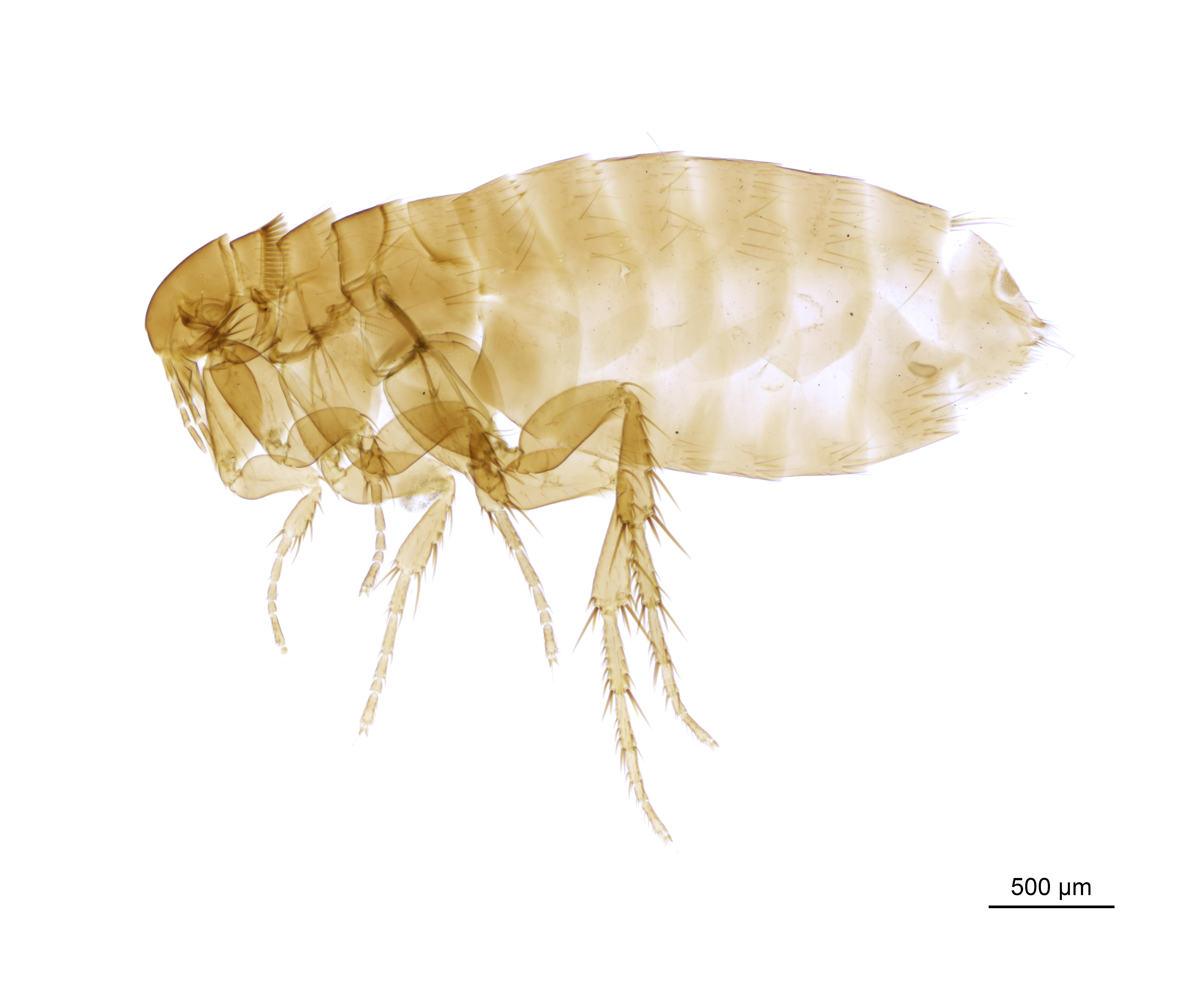
- Female boreal flea

Scientific classification
- Kingdom: Animalia
- Phylum: Arthropoda
- Clade: Pancrustacea
- Class: Insecta
- Order: Siphonaptera
- Family: Ceratophyllidae
- Genus: Ceratophyllus
- Species: C. borealis

Binomial name
- Ceratophyllus borealis Rothschild, 1906

= Ceratophyllus borealis =

Species of flea

Ceratophyllus borealis , also known as the boreal flea, is an ectoparasite of birds. It is a black species found on ground-nesting birds such as pipits, wheatears and wagtails.
