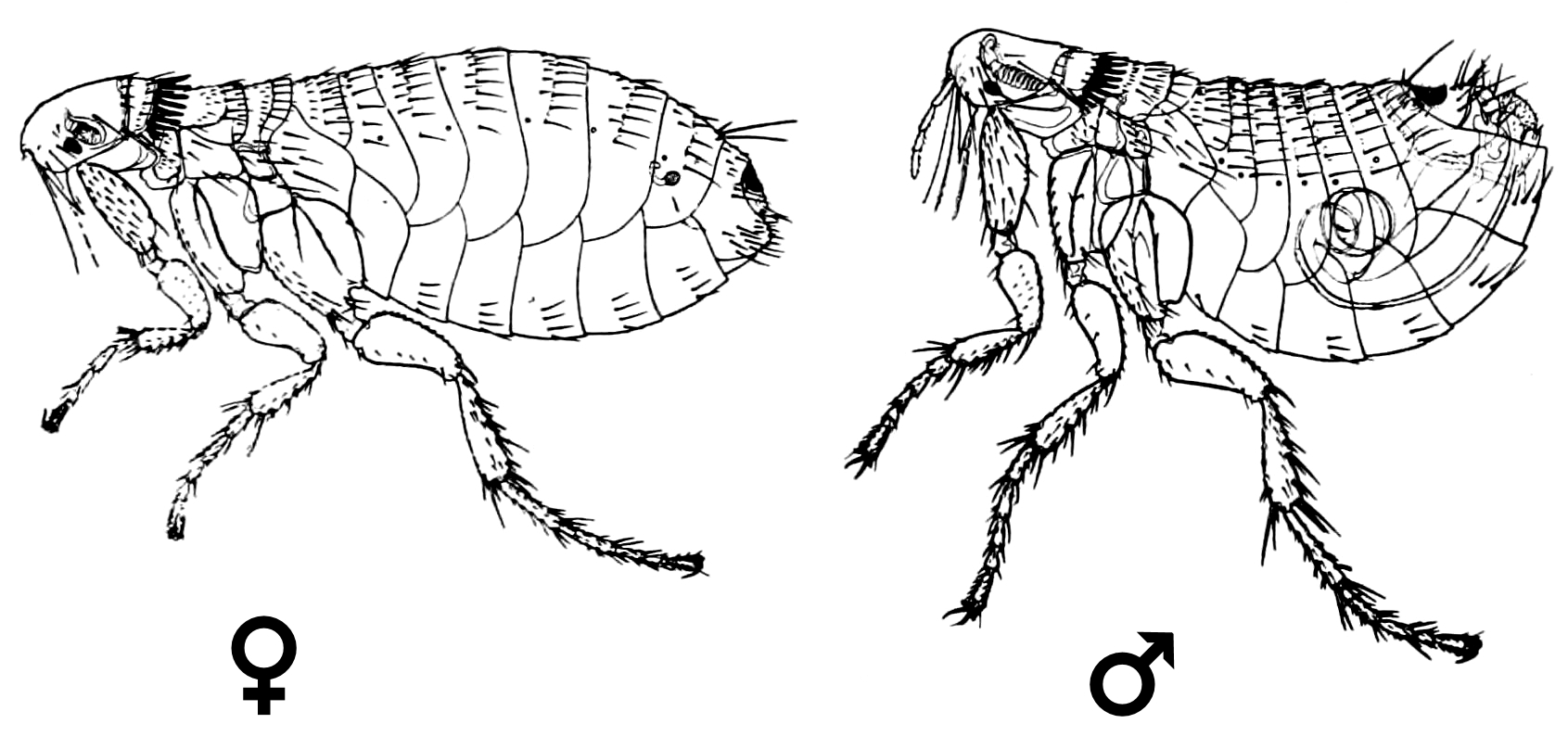
- Nosopsyllus fasciatus

Scientific classification
- Kingdom: Animalia
- Phylum: Arthropoda
- Class: Insecta
- Order: Siphonaptera
- Family: Ceratophyllidae
- Subfamily: Ceratophyllinae
- Genus: Nosopsyllus; Jordan, 1933

= Nosopsyllus =

Genus of fleas

Nosopsyllus is a genus of fleas belonging to the family Ceratophyllidae.

The species of this genus are found in Europe, Australia and Northern America.

Species:

- Nosopsyllus abramovi (Ioff, 1946)
- Nosopsyllus aegaeus Peus, 1978
- Nosopsyllus afghanus Peus, 1957
- Nosopsyllus alladinis (Rothschild, 1904)
- Nosopsyllus angorensis Aktas, 1999
- Nosopsyllus antakyaicus Aktas, 1999
- Nosopsyllus apicoprominus Tsai Liyuen, Wu Wenching & Liu Chiying, 1974
- Nosopsyllus aralis (Argyropulo, 1946)
- Nosopsyllus arcotus (Jordan & Rothschild, 1921)
- Nosopsyllus argutus (Jordan & Rothschild, 1921)
- Nosopsyllus atlantis Jordan, 1937
- Nosopsyllus baltazardi Farhang-Azad, 1970
- Nosopsyllus barbarus (Jordan & Rothschild, 1912)
- Nosopsyllus bunni Hubbard, 1956
- Nosopsyllus ceylonensis Smit, 1953
- Nosopsyllus chayuensis Wang Dunqing & Liu Quan, 1981
- Nosopsyllus consimilis (Wagner, 1898)
- Nosopsyllus durii Hubbard, 1956
- Nosopsyllus elongatus Li Kueichen & Shen Dingying, 1963
- Nosopsyllus eremicus Lewis, 1973
- Nosopsyllus farahae Farhang-Azad, 1973
- Nosopsyllus fasciatus (Bosc, 1800)
- Nosopsyllus fidusv (Jordan & Rothschild, 1915)
- Nosopsyllus garamanticus Beaucournu & Launay, 1988
- Nosopsyllus geneatus Traub, 1963
- Nosopsyllus gerbillophilus Wagner, 1934
- Nosopsyllus henleyi (Rothschild, 1904)
- Nosopsyllus incisus (Jordan & Rothschild, 1913)
- Nosopsyllus iranus Wagner & Argyropulo, 1934
- Nosopsyllus laeviceps (Wagner, 1909)
- Nosopsyllus londiniensis (Rothschild, 1903)
- Nosopsyllus maurus (Jordan & Rothschild, 1912)
- Nosopsyllus medus Jordan, 1938
- Nosopsyllus medus Lewis & Lewis, 1990
- Nosopsyllus mikulini (Kunitsky & Kynitskaya, 1961)
- Nosopsyllus mokrzeckyi (Wagner, 1916)
- Nosopsyllus monstrosus (Wagner, 1928)
- Nosopsyllus nicanus Jordan, 1937
- Nosopsyllus nilgiriensis (Jordan & Rothschild, 1921)
- Nosopsyllus oranus (Jordan, 1931)
- Nosopsyllus philippovi (Zagniborodova & Mikulin, 1957)
- Nosopsyllus pringlei Hubbard, 1956
- Nosopsyllus pumilionis Smit, 1960
- Nosopsyllus punensis (Jordan & Rothschild, 1921)
- Nosopsyllus punjabensis (Jordan & Rothschild, 1921)
- Nosopsyllus sarinus (Jordan & Rothschild, 1921)
- Nosopsyllus simla (Jordan & Rothschild, 1921)
- Nosopsyllus sinaiensis Smit, 1960
- Nosopsyllus sincerus (Jordan & Rothschild, 1921)
- Nosopsyllus tamilanus (Jordan & Rothschild, 1921)
- Nosopsyllus tersus (Jordan & Rothschild, 1915)
- Nosopsyllus turkmenicus (Vlasov & Ioff, 1937)
- Nosopsyllus vauceli Klein, 1963
- Nosopsyllus vlasovi (Vlasov & Ioff, 1937)
- Nosopsyllus wualis Jordan, 1941
- Nosopsyllus ziarus Klein, 1963
