= Amaradix =

Scientific classification
- Kingdom: Animalia
- Phylum: Arthropoda
- Class: Insecta
- Order: Siphonaptera
- Family: Ceratophyllidae
- Subfamily: Ceratophyllinae
- Genus: Amaradix; Smit, 1983

Genus of fleas

Amaradix is a genus of fleas in the family Ceratophyllidae, which comprises two known species.

== Species ==
- Amaradix bitterrootensis (Dunn, 1923)
- Amaradix euphorbi (Rothschild, 1905)
