= Aplin =

Aplin is a surname. Notable people with the surname include:

- Arch "Beaver" Aplin (1958), Founder, CEO Buc-ee's
- Chip Aplin (born 1989), Collegiate swimmer
- Anders Aplin (born 1991), Singapore footballer
- Andrew Aplin (born 1991), American baseball player
- Frank Aplin (1901–1965), New Zealand police officer
- Gabrielle Aplin (born 1992), singer/songwriter from Bath, Somerset
- Greg Aplin (born 1952), Australian politician (Liberal, NSW)
- Henry H. Aplin (1841–1910), American Civil War veteran, businessman, and politician
- Joseph Aplin (c.1740 – 1804), politician in Nova Scotia and Prince Edward Island
- Ken Aplin (1918–2004), umpire in Australian rules football
- Nick Aplin (born 1952), Senior Lecturer at the Physical Education and Sports Science Academic Group at the National Institute of Education
- Oliver Vernon Aplin (1858–1940), British ornithologist
- Peter Aplin (1753–1817), admiral in Britain's Royal Navy
- Theodore Aplin (1927–1991), Australian botanist
- William Aplin (1840–1901), pastoralist, businessman and parliamentarian in Queensland, Australia

== See also ==
- Aplin, West Virginia
- Aplin Islet, off Queensland
- Ross River (Queensland)#Aplin's Weir
