= Tarsopsylla =

Scientific classification
- Kingdom: Animalia
- Phylum: Arthropoda
- Class: Insecta
- Order: Siphonaptera
- Family: Ceratophyllidae
- Genus: Tarsopsylla; Wagner, 1927

Genus of birds

Tarsopsylla is a genus of insects belonging to the family Ceratophyllidae.

The species of this genus are found in Europe.

Species:

- Tarsopsylla octodecimdentata (Kolenati, 1863)
