= Dasypsyllus =

Scientific classification
- Kingdom: Animalia
- Phylum: Arthropoda
- Class: Insecta
- Order: Siphonaptera
- Family: Ceratophyllidae
- Subfamily: Ceratophyllinae
- Genus: Dasypsyllus; Baker, 1905

Genus of fleas

Dasypsyllus is a widespread genus of fleas. Some of its members are found in bird nests, including the moorhen flea, D. gallinulae.

== Species ==
Species include:

- Dasypsyllus aemulus (Jordan, 1933)
- Dasypsyllus araucanus (Jordan et Rothschild, 1920)
- Dasypsyllus comatus (Jordan, 1933)
- Dasypsyllus cteniopus (Jordan et Rothschild, 1920)
- Dasypsyllus gallinulae (Dale, 1878)
- Dasypsyllus lasius (Rothschild, 1909)
- Dasypsyllus plumosissimus (Smit, 1976)
- Dasypsyllus stejnegeri (Jordan, 1929)
