= Theodore Aplin =

Australian botanist

Theodore Ernest Holmes Aplin
- Born: 1927; Burma
- Died: July 3, 1991 (aged 63–64); Perth, Western Australia
- Scientific career
- Fields: Botany

Theodore Ernest Holmes Aplin (1927 – 3 July 1991), known as Ted Aplin, was an Australian botanist who was educated in India and Australia. He spent most of his working life at the Western Australian Herbarium as an identification botanist, also doing administrative work for John Green. Aplin collected more than 6,000 plant specimens for the herbarium, and the genus Taplinia is named in his honour.
