= Alfonso Dampf Tenson =

- Born: 3 December 1884; Hiiumaa (Dagö), Kreis Wiek, Governorate of Estonia, Russian Empire
- Died: 17 March 1948 (aged 63); Mexico City, Mexico
- Occupation: Entomologist
- Spouse: Herminia Torres de Alva

Alfonso Dampf Tenson (3 December 1884 Hiiumaa – 17 March 1948 Mexico City) was an entomologist. As an entomological authority he is cited as Dampf.

== Biography ==
=== Early years ===
Dampf was born on the Estonian island of Hiiumaa, the son of Michael Dampf and Maria Tenson. He obtained his doctorate degree from the University of Königsberg in 1909.

=== Career ===
During his studies Dampf began working as an assistant in the Zoological Museum and Institute of the University of Königsberg until 1912. In 1913 he was appointed as the Government Entomologist of German East Africa, a position he held until 1919. In 1920 he returned work as an assistant in the Zoological Museum and Institute of the University of Königsberg before leaving for Mexico in 1923. Dampf held multiple positions in Mexico and became a Mexican citizen in 1941.

=== Legacy ===
Dampf worked on multiple groups including Tipulidae, Siphonaptera and Simulidae. It is estimated he collected over a million insect specimens during his career.

=== Species described ===
- Ceratophyllus rossittensis
