= Megabothris =

Scientific classification
- Kingdom: Animalia
- Phylum: Arthropoda
- Class: Insecta
- Order: Siphonaptera
- Family: Ceratophyllidae
- Genus: Megabothris; Jordan, 1933

Genus of fleas

Megabothris is a genus of fleas belonging to the family Ceratophyllidae.

The species of this genus are found in Eurasia and Northern America.

Species:

- Megabothris abantis (Rothschild, 1905)
- Megabothris acerbus (Jordan, 1925)
