= Arthur Schütz =

Austrian engineer and writer

- Born: 25 January 1880; Moscow
- Died: 9 February 1960 (aged 80); Vienna
- Other name: Erich Ritter von Winkler
- Occupations: engineer, writer

Arthur Schütz (also under the pen name Erich Ritter von Winkler) (25 January 1880, Moscow – 9 February 1960, Vienna) was an Austrian engineer and writer, most notable for creating a special kind of hoax called "Grubenhund".

== Life ==
Schütz was born as son of the Austrian consul in Moscow. He studied engineering and in 1904 established a company, "Arthur Schütz & Co.", specializing on drive systems and components in Vienna. He later published the magazine Riementechnische Mitteilungen.

== The "Grubenhund" ==
In November 1911, Schütz was dissatisfied with the editorial standards of the Viennese newspaper Neue Freie Presse after they had exaggerated the effects of a recent, rather harmless, earthquake. In order to "educate" them, he wrote a letter that his "Grubenhund" (German for "mining dog") had been uneasy half an hour before the earthquake happened. The journalists of the Neue Freie Presse reprinted the letter in their newspaper shortly afterwards without checking it for facts. They were told afterwards that a "Grubenhund" is the term for an underground freight wagon used for transporting the ore in mines, which was actually common knowledge and could have been easily checked.

Following this incident, "Grubenhund" has been used as a term for a kind of hoax that does not even attempt to fool the reader but that is used to expose journalists who are too careless when deciding what to print in their newspapers. Schütz went on to author several similar Grubenhunds, all of which were printed in various publications. For example, he managed to make the Neue Freie Presse print a letter to the editor in which he complained that the Federal Railway of Austria now used fireproof coal and oval wheels. Schütz devised those hoaxes as a kind of educational training together with friends and co-workers, to set out to prove that any article will be picked up by the media and circulated if it manages merely to seem convincing and legitimately scientifically proven.

== Legacy ==
In 2004, the "Arthur-Schütz-Institut" tried to make German newspapers print a "Grubenhund". The organization, which claimed to be a gene research institute but was actually a group of researchers of the Catholic University of Eichstätt-Ingolstadt, claimed to have found a gene in the human DNA which is responsible for all sexual behavior, even as detailed as the choice of sexual partners. The story was a failure though, with only 3 of 1500 editorial departments contacted accepting it as fact.

== Bibliography ==
- Schütz, Arthur (1931). Der Grubenhund : Experimente mit der Wahrheit.

== See also ==
- Sokal affair – a hoax similar to the "Grubenhund"
