= F.G.A.M. Smit =

Dutch entomologist

Franciscus Gerardus Albertus Maria Smit (in literature usually as F.G.A.M. Smit) (7 June 1920 – 28 January 2000) was a Dutch-born entomologist and specialist on the fleas who worked at the Natural History Museum at Tring where he was in charge of the Rothschild collection of fleas and lice.

Smit was born in Zutphen, Netherlands, and was educated at Nijmegen. Poor health in his teenage years and an interest in natural history led him to study horticulture after which he worked part time for a florist and an estate agent. In 1940, he joined the ministry of agriculture and worked on studies on the apple-blossom weevil (Anthonomus pomorum L.) at Geldermalsen in the north but when the Germans invaded the region in May 1940 he was left without work and earned by gardening and playing or teaching the violin. He then worked at a transport company in Venlo but was allowed time to attend entomology lectures at the University of Wageningen. He had collected beetles from childhood, but in 1941 he suddenly noticed a lack of knowledge on lice and fleas. He spent two week after leaving his work in the Coal Office in Nijmegen where he worked from 1942 as a clerk to examine the collections at the Rothschild flea collection in Tring. He returned to write a popular book in Dutch on fleas and lice (Vlooien en Luizen) (1951). From 1947 he worked at the Phytopathological institute in Wageningen and in 1948 he was invited by Miriam Rothschild for a temporary assistant position to succeed F. Cox who was retiring. On 2 January 1949, he moved to England and when Cox retired in 1950 he became custodian of the Rothschild Collection and worked there until his own retirement in 1980. He described a large number of flea taxa.
