= Charles Rothschild =

English entomologist and environmentalist (1877–1923)

The Honourable Charles Rothschild
- Charles Rothschild
- Born: Nathaniel Charles Rothschild; 9 May 1877; London, England
- Died: 12 October 1923 (aged 46); Ashton Wold, Northamptonshire
- Occupations: Banker, entomologist
- Spouse: Rózsika von Wertheimstein (after 1907)
- Children: Miriam Rothschild; Elizabeth Charlotte Rothschild; Victor Rothschild, 3rd Baron Rothschild; Pannonica Rothschild
- Parent(s): Nathan Rothschild, 1st Baron Rothschild; Emma Louise von Rothschild

Nathaniel Charles Rothschild (9 May 1877 – 12 October 1923) was an English banker and entomologist and a member of the Rothschild family. He is remembered for the Rothschild List, a list he made in 1915 of 284 sites across Britain that he considered suitable for nature reserves.

== Family ==
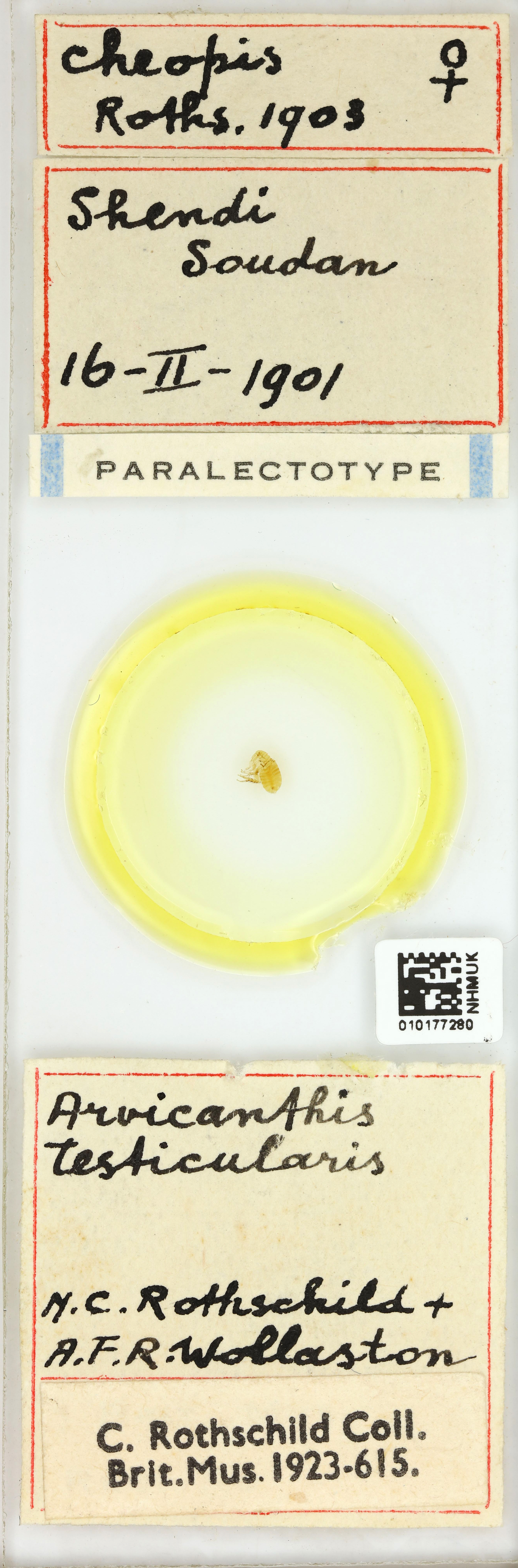
A slide of a plague flea collected and described by Rothschild and his colleague A. F. R. Wollaston

Nathaniel Charles Rothschild was born in London into the Rothschild family, a prominent Jewish family of bankers. His parents, Nathan Rothschild, 1st Baron Rothschild, and Emma Rothschild (née von Rothschild), were cousins. Charles boarded at Harrow School, which he found somewhat traumatising for incidents of bullying on account of his religion.

He worked as a partner in the family bank N M Rothschild & Sons in London. He went to Rothschild's Bank every morning and despite his interest in science and in natural history, he was never absent from work. He was also very interested in the gold refinery operated by Rothschild's and invented a variety of devices for collecting gold and working on gold from a scientific point of view. He also became Chairman of the Alliance Assurance Company.

Charles predeceased his older brother Walter Rothschild, 2nd Baron Rothschild (1868–1937), who died without issue. The peerage therefore passed to Charles's son Victor Rothschild, 3rd Baron Rothschild.

== Career ==
=== Entomology ===
Like his zoologist brother Walter, Charles devoted much of his energies to entomology and natural history collecting. His enormous collection of some 260,000 fleas is now in the Rothschild Collection at the Natural History Museum; he described about 500 new flea species. One of these, which he discovered and named, was the Bubonic plague vector flea, Xenopsylla cheopis, also known as the oriental rat flea, which he collected at Shendi, Sudan, on an expedition in 1901, publishing his finding in 1903.

=== Nature conservation ===
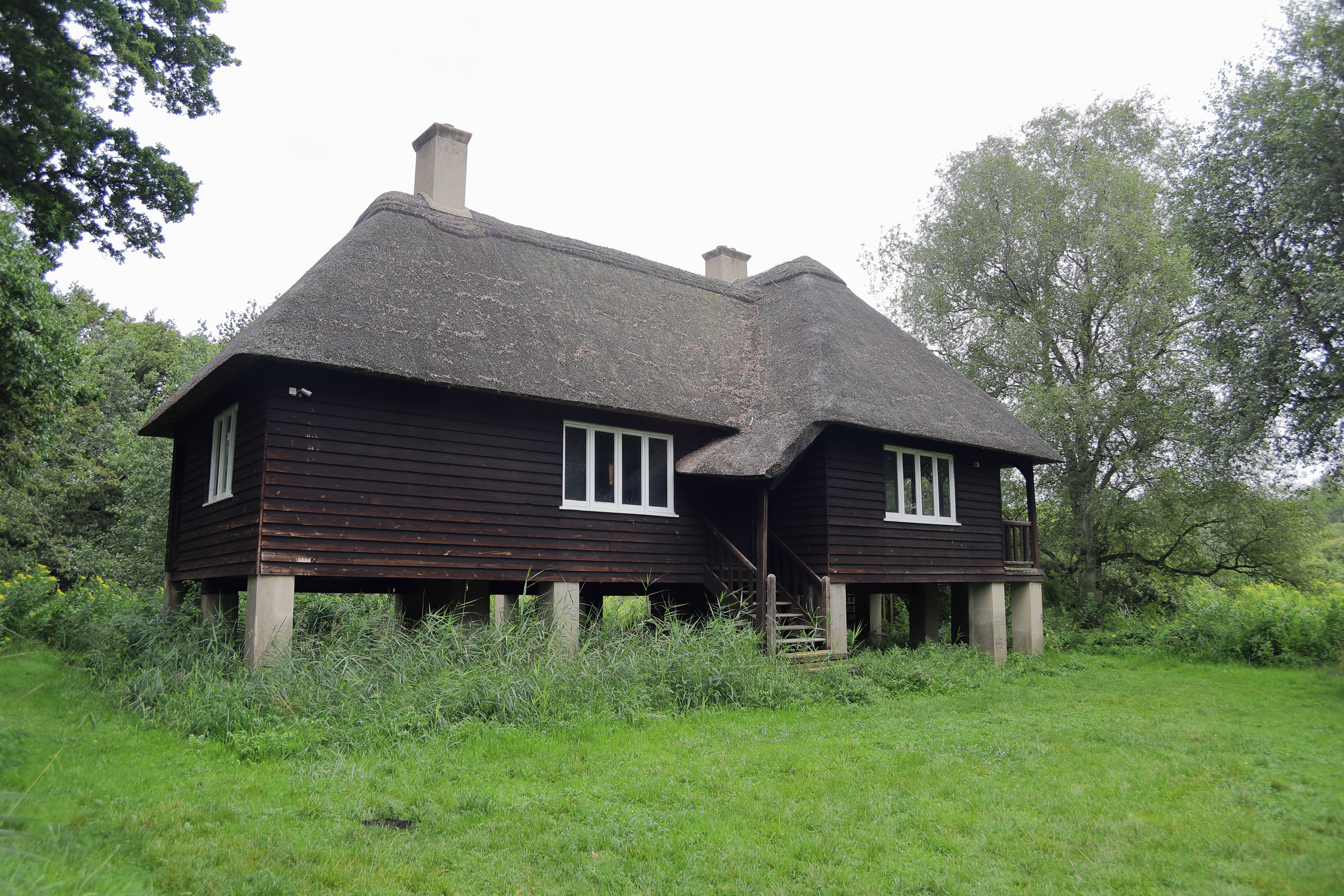
The bungalow in Woodwalton Fen, built by Rothschild in 1911 as a base for field trips

Rothschild is regarded as a pioneer of nature conservation in Britain, and is credited with establishing one of the earliest nature reserves in the UK when (at the age of 22) he bought Wicken Fen, near Ely, in 1899.. Wicken Fen was presented to the National Trust but the Trust declined to take Woodwalton Fen, near Huntingdon, which Rothschild bought in 1910, and this wetland, now a National Nature Reserve, was kept as a private nature reserve. In 1911 Rothschild built a bungalow at Woodwalton Fen as a base for fields trips, which still stands. During his lifetime he built and managed the Ashton Wold estate in Northamptonshire to maximise its suitability for wildlife, especially butterflies.

He was concerned about the loss of wildlife habitats, and in 1912 set up the Society for the Promotion of Nature Reserves, the forerunner of the Wildlife Trusts partnership. He produced 'the Rothschild List', a schedule of the best 284 wildlife sites in the country, some of which were purchased as nature reserves; the list was published in 1915 by the Society for the Promotion of Nature Reserves.

=== Public service ===
As well as a Lieutenant of the City of London, Rothschild became a JP for the county of Northamptonshire in 1902. He served as High Sheriff of Northamptonshire for 1905.

== Personal life ==
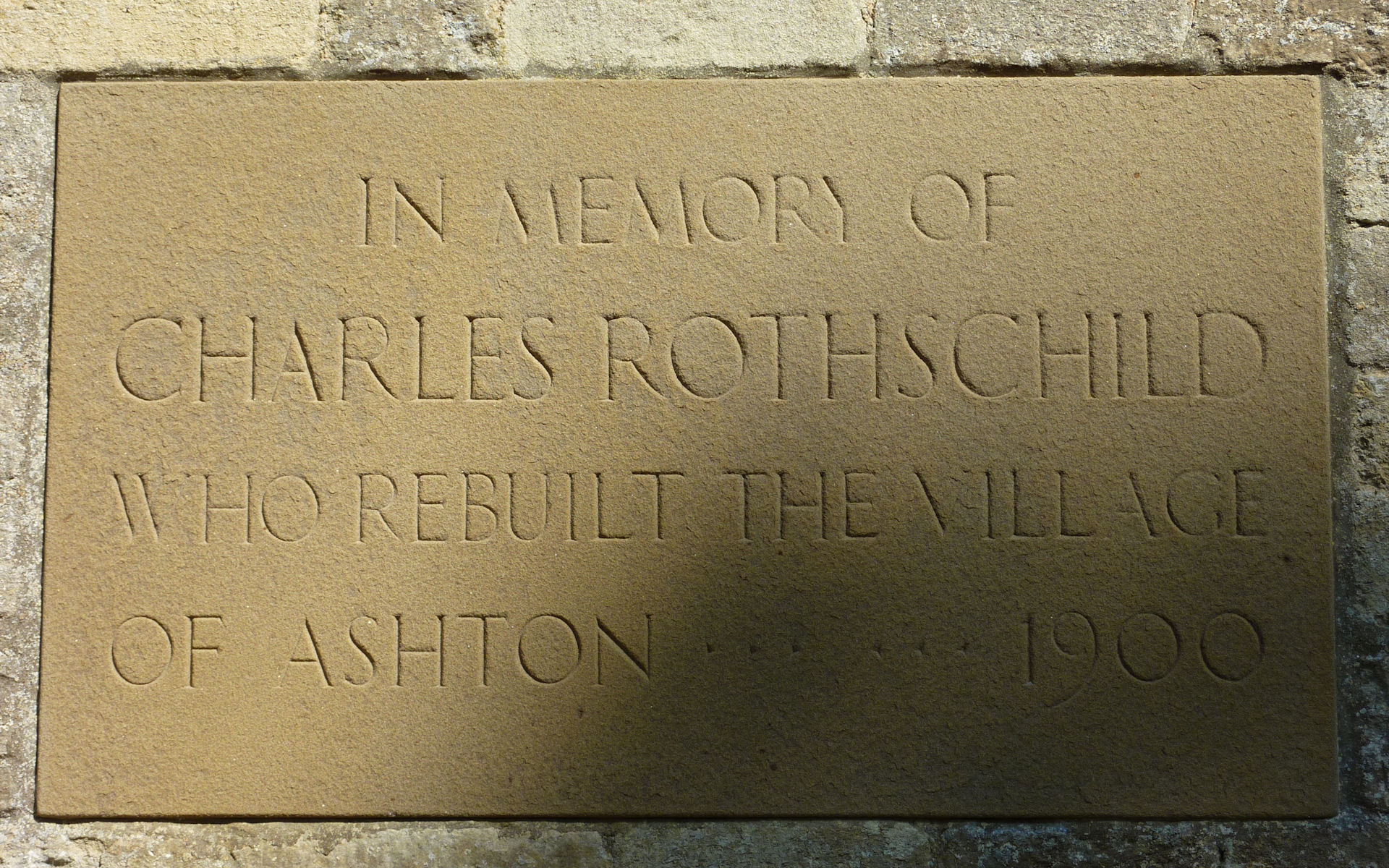
Commemorative stone on the wall of the chapel at Ashton, North Northamptonshire to Charles Rothschild "who rebuilt the village of Ashton 1900"

In 1907, Rothschild married Rózsika Edle von Wertheimstein (1870–1940), a descendant of an old Austrian-Jewish family that was ennobled long before the Rothschilds. She was born in 1870 at Nagyvárad, Hungary (now the Romanian city of Oradea), the daughter of a retired army officer, Baron Alfred Edler von Wertheimstein. Alfred's sister Charlotte was married to Moritz von Königswarter. Rózsika was one of seven children and had been a champion lawn tennis player in Hungary.

After their marriage on 6 February 1907, they lived at Tring and in London. Rothschild, who worked in the family's banking business, was a dedicated naturalist in his spare time: the young couple had met on a butterfly-collecting trip in the Carpathian Mountains. In the evening, they might go together to a concert or a dinner party, but he really preferred to sort out his butterflies. Together, they had four children:

- Miriam Louisa Rothschild (1908–2005), a zoologist
- Elizabeth Charlotte Rothschild (1909–1988), known as "Liberty"
- Nathaniel Mayer Victor Rothschild (1910–1990), known as "Victor", 3rd Baron Rothschild.
- Kathleen Annie Pannonica Rothschild (1913–1988), known as "Nica", a bebop jazz enthusiast and patroness of Thelonious Monk and Charlie Parker

Suffering from encephalitis, in 1923 Rothschild died by suicide. He was found with his throat slit, locked alone inside the bathroom at his home, Ashton Wold. His suicide, when he was 46 years old, was a severe shock to his wife and four children. He is buried at Willesden Jewish Cemetery, North London. Rózsika died on 30 June 1940.

== Ancestry ==
Ancestors of Charles Rothschild

8. Baron Nathan Mayer Rothschild (= 14)
4. Baron Lionel de Rothschild
9. Hannah Barent Cohen (= 15)
2. Nathan Rothschild, 1st Baron Rothschild
10. Baron Carl Mayer von Rothschild (= 12)
5. Baroness Charlotte von Rothschild
11. Adelheid Herz (= 13)
1. Hon. Charles Rothschild
12. Baron Carl Mayer von Rothschild (= 10)
6. Baron Mayer Carl von Rothschild
13. Adelheid Herz (= 11)
3. Baroness Emma von Rothschild
14. Baron Nathan Mayer Rothschild (= 8)
7. Baroness Louise von Rothschild
15. Hannah Barent Cohen (= 9)

== See also ==
- History of the Jews in England
- Rothschild banking family of England
