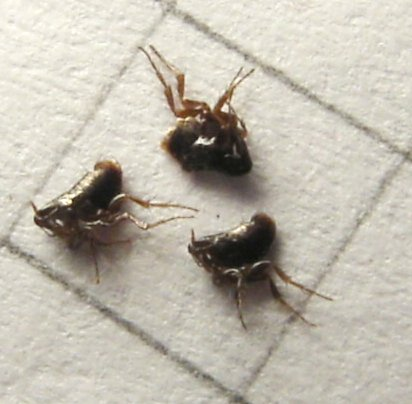
- Ceratophyllidae fleas, likely Ceratophyllus sp. or Dasypsyllus gallinulae

Scientific classification
- Kingdom: Animalia
- Phylum: Arthropoda
- Clade: Pancrustacea
- Class: Insecta
- Order: Siphonaptera
- Infraorder: Ceratophyllomorpha
- Superfamily: Ceratophylloidea
- Family: Ceratophyllidae; Dampf, 1908

Genera
- About 45, see text

Synonyms
- Dolichopsyllidae

= Ceratophyllidae =

Family of fleas

Ceratophyllidae is a family of fleas. Its members are parasites of mainly rodents and birds. It contains two subfamilies, one containing over 40 genera, and the other just three.

Subfamily Ceratophyllinae

- Aenigmopsylla
- Aetheca
- Amalaraeus
- Amaradix
- Amphalius
- Baculomeris
- Brevictenidia
- Callopsylla
- Ceratophyllus
- Citellophilus
- Dasypsyllus
- Eumolpianus
- Glaciopsyllus
- Hollandipsylla
- Igioffius
- Jellisonia
- Kohlsia
- Libyastus
- Macrostylophora
- Malaraeus
- Margopsylla
- Megabothris
- Megathoracipsylla

Subfamily Ceratophyllinae (continued)

- Mioctenopsylla
- Myoxopsylla
- Nosopsyllus
- Opisodasys
- Orchopeas
- Oropsylla
- Paraceras
- Paramonopsyllus
- Pleochaetis
- Plusaetis
- Rostropsylla
- Rowleyella
- Smitipsylla
- Spuropsylla
- Syngenopsyllus
- Tarsopsylla
- Thrassis
- Traubella
- Psittopsylla

Subfamily Dactylopsyllinae

- Dactylopsylla
- Foxella
- Spicata
