= Koenigswarter =

Koenigswarter is a surname, derived from the Bohemian town of Königswart. Members of the ennobled Königswarter family include:

- Baron Jules de Koenigswarter
- Baroness Nica de Koenigswarter, known as the "Jazz Baroness"
- Baron Louis de Koenigswarter

== See also ==
- Palais Königswarter
