= History of the Jews in Hanover =

History of Jewish community in Germany

The history of the Jews in Hanover began in the 13th century. As of 2009, Hanover's four Jewish congregations comprised about 6,200 people.

== Early history ==
Jews were already living in Hanover in the 14th century. They constituted a minority within the city and adhered to their traditional, ritually prescribed ways of life (such as the Sabbath commandment and observance of dietary laws). As Schutzjuden, they had a special legal status, required explicit permission from the authorities and did not have the rights of the other inhabitants.

After anti-Jewish sermons by Protestant clergymen led to violent riots, the Hanover City Council banned trade between Christians and Jews in 1588. Deprived of their livelihood, the Jews left Hanover's old town and moved to the then still independent Calenberger Neustadt. Until the 19th century, no Jews lived in the Hanoverian old town.

In Calenberg's Neustadt, where the Jews built the New Synagogue (destroyed in the Reichspogromnacht of 1938) in the 19th century, they were also suppressed after fleeing the old town. Already in 1593 their "temple" was "destroyed and abolished" by order of Duke Heinrich Julius. The Jews themselves were expelled from the new town, their property was "graciously assigned to the church" by the duke. In 1608 they were allowed to return and in 1609 they completed their new place of worship. However, ecclesiastical dignitaries of the Calenberg region were outraged that the Jews had once again built a synagogue on the "Neustadt vor Hannover". The Protestant superintendent of Ronnenberg, Wichmann Schulrabe, to whose district the Neustadt vor Hannover belonged, finally complained in writing to the consistory in Wolfenbüttel on February 1, 1613. As a consequence, the Grand Bailiff of Calenberg ordered the demolition of this second Jewish house of worship in the new town of Calenberg in the same year. Therefore, the Jews of the new town of Calenberg had "for a long time no place in which they could worship together". In 1688 they were allowed to build a small synagogue in the house of their headman Levin Goldschmidt. In 1703, the court and chamber agent of the Hanoverian Guelph dukes, Leffmann Behrens, succeeded in obtaining permission to build a new synagogue on the site where the synagogue demolished in 1613 had stood. The independent Jewish culture was maintained in this seclusion - on a place in a backyard not visible to the public.

The first printed address book of the city of Hanover from 1798 listed individual Jews at the end of the book in a directory of Jews engaged in trade and commerce in the Calenberger Neustadt area.

== 19th and early 20th century ==
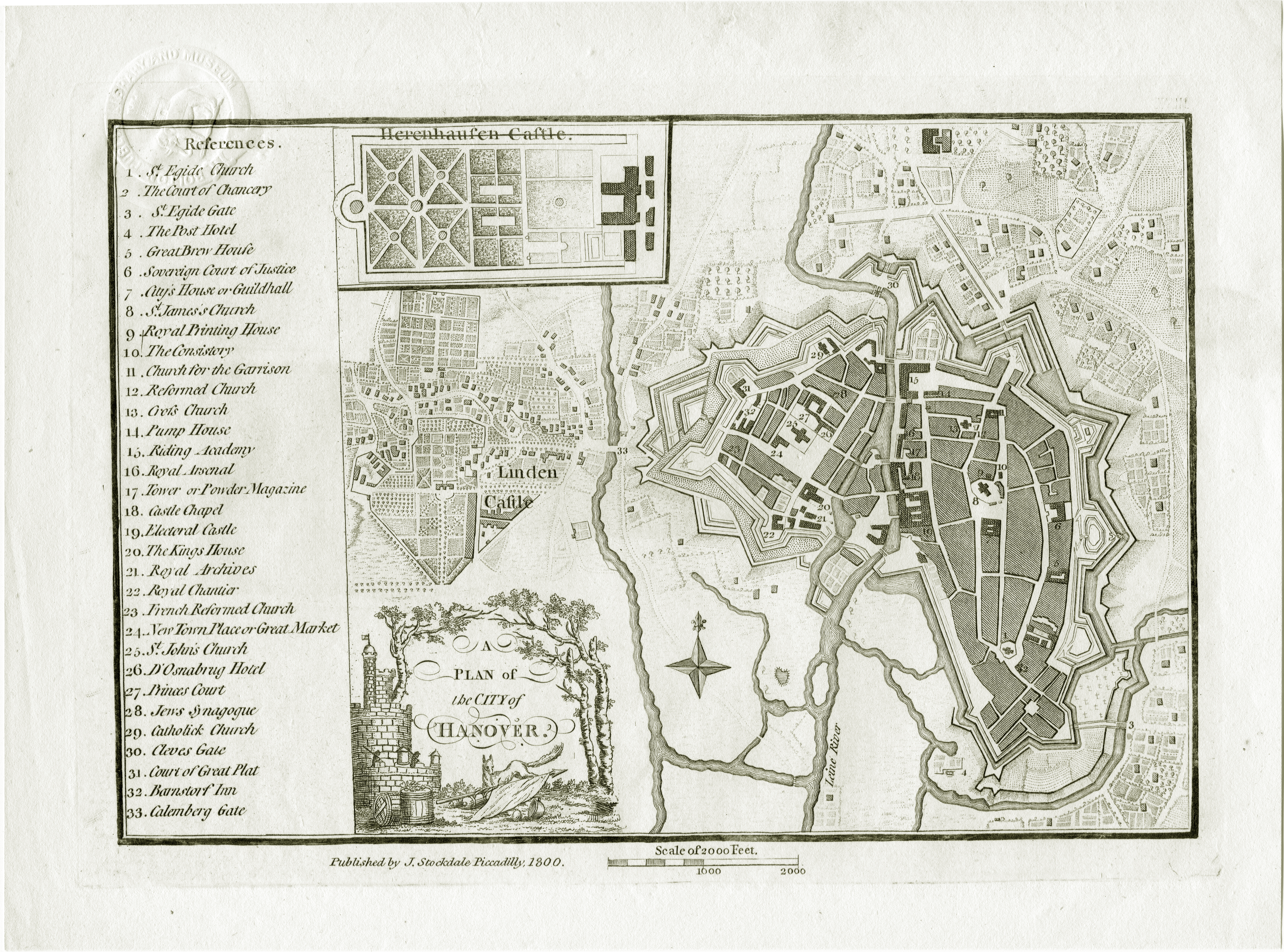
Around 1800: Synagogue as number 28 in John Stockdale's town plan with Hanover, Calenberger Neustadt, Linden and Great Garden

For a short period of time - until 1814 - equal rights were granted to Jewish men in the French-ruled Kingdom of Westphalia.

Mainly active in commercial and financial professions, the Jewish minority existed on the fringes of society until the middle of the 19th century. Their number gradually increased to about 500 people by the beginning of the 19th century.

In the Kingdom of Hanover, the right of exemption was abolished in 1842, and Jews became equal to other citizens by law. In the middle of the 19th century, Israel Simon was considered Hanover's first banker.

As the Jewish population in Hanover grew in the course of the 19th century, the Old Synagogue became too small. From 1864 to 1870, after the demolition of older buildings in Bergstraße (today Rote Reihe) in Calenberger Neustadt, the New Synagogue was built. It was located in the neighborhood of Hanover's main churches. The building, designed by Edwin Oppler in the style of historicism, was a symbol of self-confidence and recognition of the Jews and had a style-defining effect on the construction of synagogues in the German Empire.

In 1893, Alexander Moritz Simon founded the Israelite Educational Institution in Ahlem, which was renamed the Israelite Horticultural School Ahlem in 1919.

At the beginning of the 20th century, about 5000 Jews lived in Hanover. The years leading up to the National Socialists' "seizure of power" in 1933 brought a social rise of Jewry in bourgeois society. But secularly oriented Jews, such as the KPD politicians Werner Scholem and Iwan Katz, also became involved in the Hanoverian labor movement. At the same time, a new anti-Semitism developed in the form of anti-liberal and anti-democratic movements, which became state doctrine with the seizure of power in 1933. As a result of new persecutions, the number of Hanoverian Jews dropped to about 4800 people in 1936.

== Nazi era (1933-1945) ==
In the time of National Socialism from 1933 on, the Jews were persecuted. By 1938 about 4800 Jews still remained in Hanover. Under city building councilor Karl Elkart there were aryanizations, plunder, expulsions, deportations and murder, which destroyed the Jewish community of Hanover.

=== Poland Action and November Pogroms ===
On October 28, 1938, 484 Jews of Polish nationality were rounded up in Hanover as part of the Polish Action, collected in the hall of the "Rusthaus" (Burgstraße 30), and deported across the Polish border from the main train station.

Among those expelled was the Grünspan family from Burgstraße 36. The second oldest son of the family, Herschel Grünspan, was in Paris at the time. When he learned of the expulsion of his family, he bought a revolver on November 7, 1938, drove to the German embassy in Paris and shot five times at Legationsrat Ernst Eduard vom Rath, who died on November 9. This was used by the National Socialists as a pretext for the long-planned November pogroms of 1938, which were staged as "spontaneous actions of popular anger." All over the German Reich, synagogues were set on fire the following night, including the New Synagogue in Hanover on Bergstraße. In Hanover, 94 Jewish businesses and 27 homes were destroyed, and 334 Jews from Hanover and the surrounding area were arrested and deported to Buchenwald concentration camp.

On June 25, 1939, another smaller group of Jews was deported.

=== So-called "Jewish houses" ===
At the beginning of the Second World War, there were still around 2000 Jews living in Hanover. On September 3 and 4, 1941, the "Aktion Lauterbacher" ghettoized Jewish families. Around 1200 Jews had to leave their houses and apartments and were crammed into 15 so-called "Judenhäuser" under catastrophic living conditions. These included:

- The Alte Synagogue (old synagogue), at Bergstraße 8, in the Calenberger Neustadt district
- A school building at Lützowstraße 3, in the Mitte district
- An administrative building (now the site of a Berufsschulzentrum (vocational school)), at Ohestraße 8/9, in the Calenberger Neustadt district
- Jewish hospital and retirement home, at Ellernstraße 16, in the Zooviertel district
- A retirement home at Auf dem Emmerberge 31, in the Südstadt district
- The Jewish women's retirement home Heinemanhof, in the Kirchrode district
- Prayer hall of the new Jewish cemetery, in the Nordstadt district
- Israelitische Gartenbauschule (Israelite horticultural school), in the Ahlem district
- Residential building at Dieterichsstraße 28, in the Warmbüchenviertel district
- Residential building at Herschelstraße 31, in the Mitte district
- Residential building at Josephstraße 22 (now Otto-Brenner-Straße), in the Mitte district
- Residential building at Knochenhauerstraße 61, in the Altstadt (old town) district
- Residential building at Körnerstraße 24, in the Mitte district
- Residential building at Scholvinstraße 12, in the Mitte district
- Residential building at Wunstorfer Straße 16a, in the Limmer district

=== Deportations ===
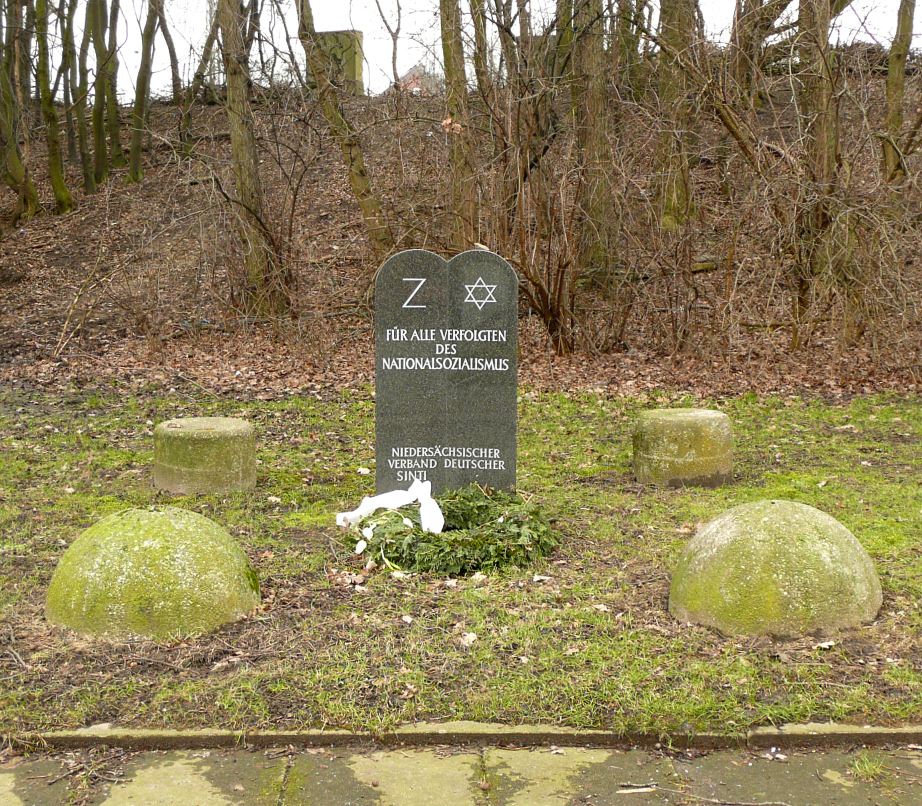
Memorial at the Fischerhof train station **

Expulsion from homes preceded the deportation of Jews from Germany, which began a short time later. At the end of 1941 and even before the Wannsee Conference in February 1942, many Jews living in Hanover were forcibly taken to the designated collection camp, the Israelitische Gartenbauschule (Israelite horticultural school) in Ahlem. From there, 1001 people were transported to the Fischerhof train station in Linden on 15th December 1941, and deported to the Riga ghetto after luggage checks and body searches. A further six transports departed from this station between 1941 and 1944, taking victims to concentration camps and ghettos in Auschwitz, Theresienstadt and Warsaw. An eighth transport from Hanover took place in 1945 from another station.

A total of around 2400 people from the city and southern Lower Saxony were deported from Hanover, very few of whom survived the Shoah. From the first transport in 1941 with 1001 people it is known that 68 survived the Second World War.

On the 70th anniversary of the first deportation, the city of Hannover commemorated the event on December 15, 2011, with memorial events attended by five survivors. This included a light action on Trammplatz. Schoolchildren lit a candle for each of the 1001 deported people, which when lined up formed a Star of David. The other program included an exhibition in the New Town Hall and a symposium.

== Concentration Camps ==
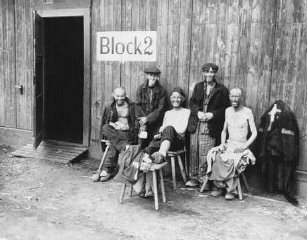
Concentration camp prisoners in front of barrack 2 in Hanover-Ahlem concentration camp after liberation by the U.S. Army

In the present-day city area of Hanover, seven subcamps were established in 1943 and 1944 at the end of World War II, which were assigned to the Neuengamme concentration camp. The satellite camps were affiliated with industrial plants in which the concentration camp prisoners – including many Jews – were forced to perform labour under inhumane conditions.

- Subcamp Hanover-Ahlem
- Subcamp Hanover-Langenhagen
- Subcamp Hanover-Limmer
- Subcamp Hanover-Misburg
- Subcamp Hanover-Mühlenberg
- Subcamp Hanover-Stöcken
- Subcamp Hanover-Stöcken

Subcamp Hanover-Stöcken was established in early 1944 and held around 1,500 Jewish male prisoners, who were forced to work for the Continental Gummi-Werke (today's Continental) under brutal conditions. In the 2010s, Continental commissioned an independent historian to explore this history, which exposed the company's then-deep integration into the Nazi war economy and its use of forced labour from concentrating camp prisoners under inhumane conditions.

== Postwar ==
By the time American troops occupied Hanover on 10th April 1945, only about 100 Jews remained in the city. After World War II, Jews returning from the concentration camps were in need of medical treatment, financial assistance and psychological support.

On 10th August 1945, the British occupation authorities granted permission to establish a Jewish congregation, with Norbert Prager becoming its first chairman. A second Jewish congregation, the Jewish Committee, was initially critical of Prager.

Jewish organisation and the newly-established Lower Saxony state government helped ensure social support for community members. As new arrivals settled in the city, Jewish life slowly began to re-emerge.

In the months following the liberation of Bergen-Belsen concentration camp, a number of Jewish survivors left the Bergen-Belsen camp and also settled in Hanover. Once the community of Jewish survivors in Hanover had grown large enough to appoint a rabbi, Rabbi Shlomo Zev Zweigenhaft recommended his friend, Rabbi Chaim Pinchas Lubinsky, to the Emergency Religious Council of the British Chief Rabbi for the role of Chief Rabbi. This took place in January 1946. The congregation grew and more rabbis were needed; Rabbi Shlomo Zev Zweigenhaft became the second rabbi in Hannover. In 1949, the Jewish community in Hanover elected Zweigenhaft as its sole rabbi. Thereafter, many smaller Jewish communities in Lower Saxony also appointed rabbis, and Zweigenhaft became Chief Rabbi of Hanover and Lower Saxony.

== Present ==
=== Memorials ===
Since 1994, the Memorial to the Murdered Jews of Hanover on Opernplatz has commemorated the persecution of Jews in Hanover. The memory of Jewish citizens is also served by Stolpersteine, laid in the pavement at their former residences. By 2015, 330 stones had been laid in the city. A central memorial for the Hanover region was established at the former site of the Hanover-Ahlem subcamp.

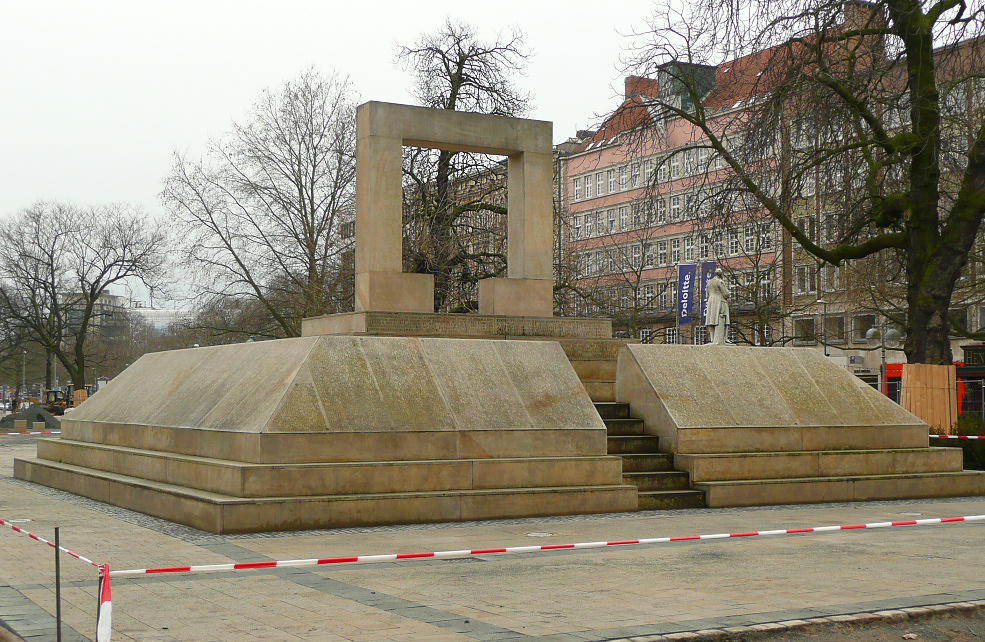
Memorial to the murdered Jews of Hanover at Opernplatz

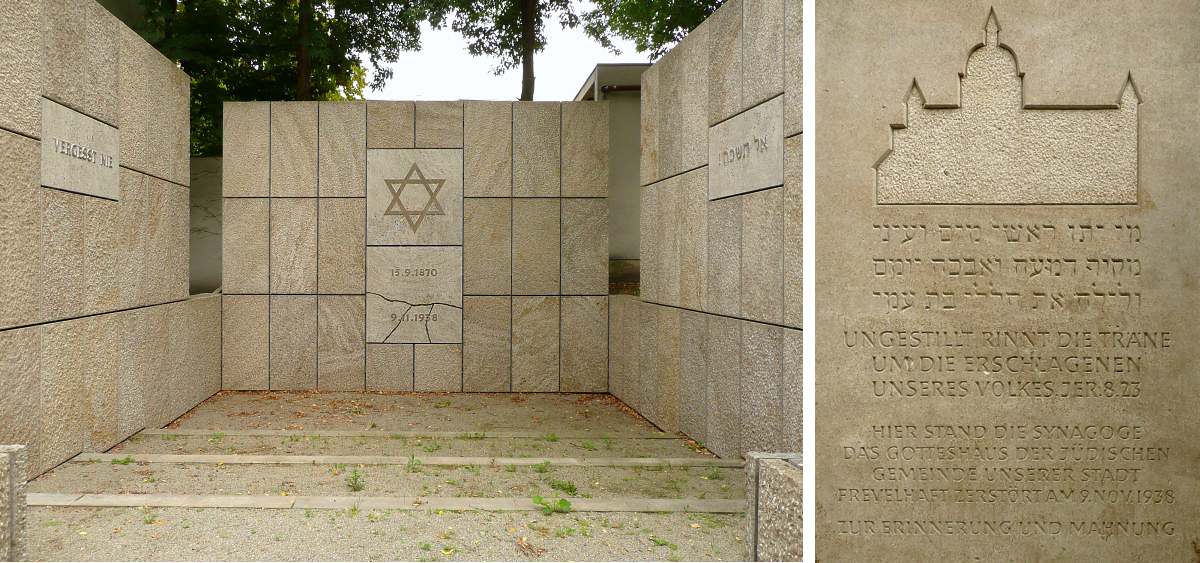
Memorial site near the former Neue Synagigue (new synagogue), which was destroyed during the November pogroms in 1938

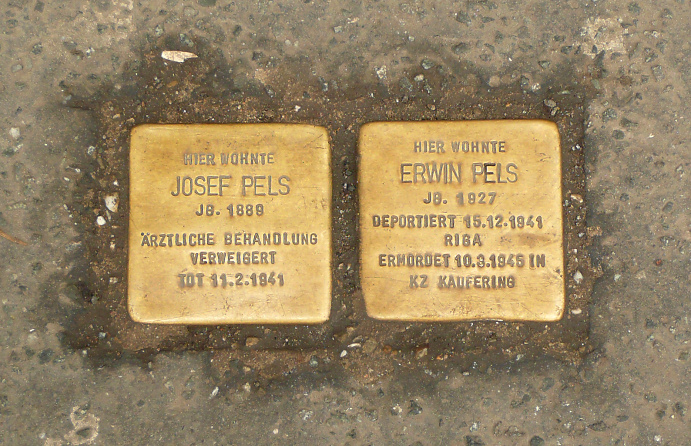
Stolpersteine commemorating Jewish residents, here at Goetheplatz

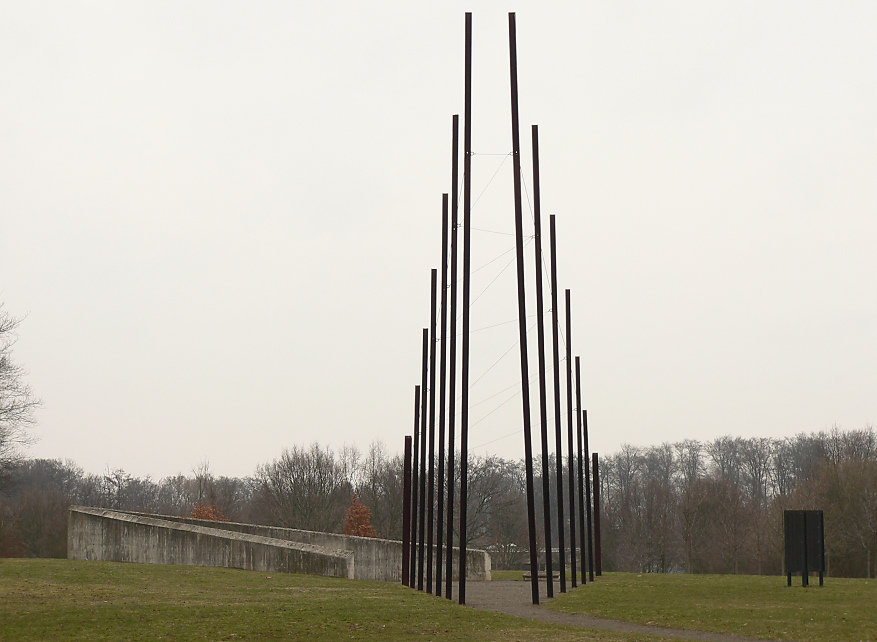
Memorial to the Hanover-Ahlem subcamp

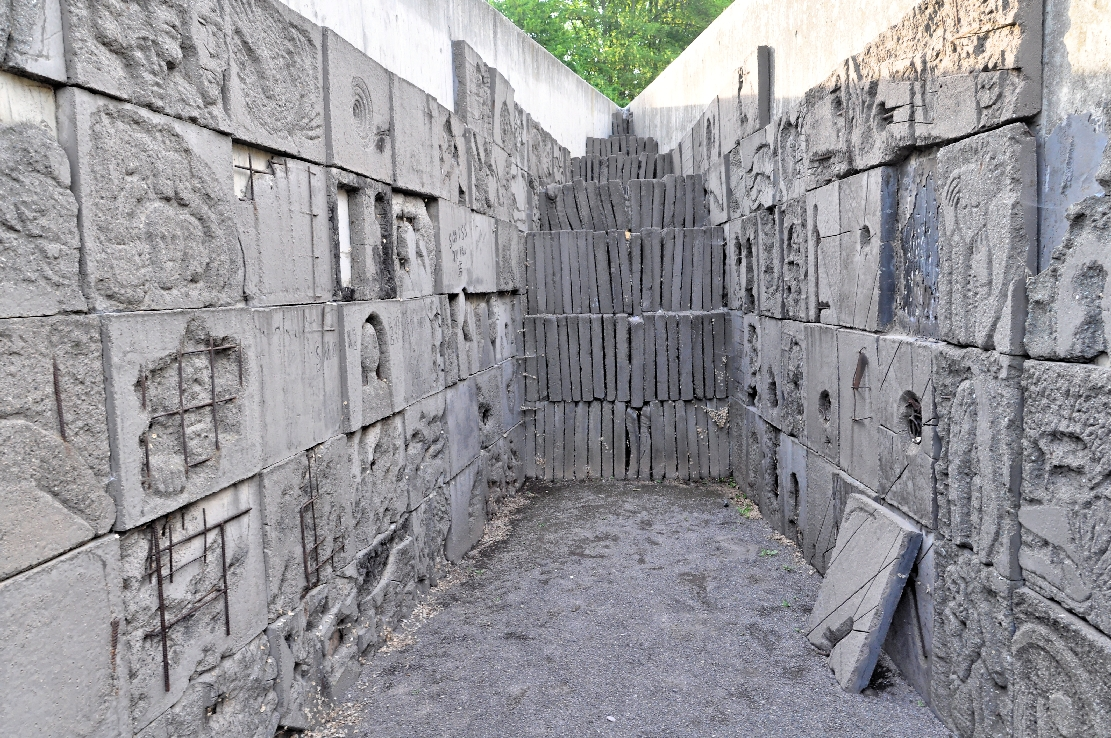
Interior of the Hanover-Ahlem Asphaltschacht memorial

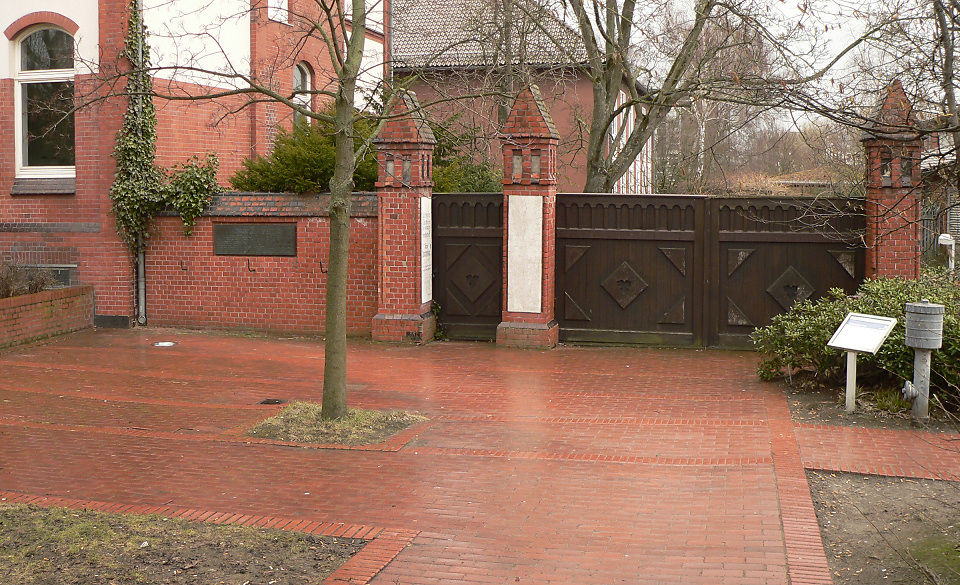
Memorial to the Israelitische Gartenbauschule Ahlem (Israelite horticultural school in Ahlem district)

=== Communities ===
As of 2025, Hanover has four Jewish congregations, three orthodox and one liberal.

==== The Central Jewish Community ====
Jüdische Gemeinde Hannover K.d.ö.R. (Jewish Congregation Hanover) comprising around 3,800 members in 2023. Chairmans are Michael Fürst, Dan Litvan and Juri Gurewich. the Rabbi is Shimon Kutnovsky-Liak.

In 1953, a Jewish retirement home was inaugurated at Haeckelstraße 6 in the Bult district. In the course of the following years, further Jews residing in Hanover were accepted as members of the congregation. Beginning in 1957, regular religious instruction was again held for Jewish children. The next steps were the construction of a new Jewish community center at Haeckelstraße 10 with a high-rise residential building, a hall for cultural purposes, school rooms, a community office and club rooms. In 1963, the new synagogue on Haeckelstraße was built and inaugurated on November 10, 1963. After 1990, community life was considerably expanded, especially in the areas of youth, cultural, social and senior citizen work. The membership of the Jewish Community of Hanover increased from originally 900 to about 5000 in 2009 under the management of Arkady Litvan.

==== Liberal Jewish Community ====
The Liberal Jewish Community Hannover K.d.Ö.R. has about 700 members. The chairwoman is Rebecca Seidler.

In September 1995, after internal conflicts, 79 members broke away from the Jewish Community and founded a New Jewish Community of Hanover. In 1997, it was a founding member of the Union of Progressive Jews in Germany Austria and Switzerland and soon renamed itself the Liberal Jewish Community of Hanover. It opened its synagogue "Etz Chaim" in Leinhausen in January 2009. The building was previously the Protestant Gustav Adolf Church (church construction: 1965-71, Fritz Eggeling, reconstruction: 2007-09, Prof. Gesche Grabenhorst and Roger Ahrens), which was converted into a Jewish community center. The community center is also the office of the Landesverband der israelitischen Kultusgemeinden von Niedersachsen K.d.ö.R. (State Association of Jewish Communities in Lower Saxony).)

==== Jewish Bukharian Sephardic Center Germany ====
(Jüdisch-bucharisch-sefardisches Zentrum Deutschland) In September 2009, a community of Bukharian Jews opened its synagogue in Ricklingen. It has about 300 members, the chairman is Juhanu Motaev. the Rabbi is Yohanan Yakobov.

==== Chabad Lubavitch Hannover ====
The local Hasidic Orthodox movement of Chabad Lubavitch maintains its own educational center in Kleefeld. It has around 400 under the leadership of rebbetzin Sterni Wolf members.

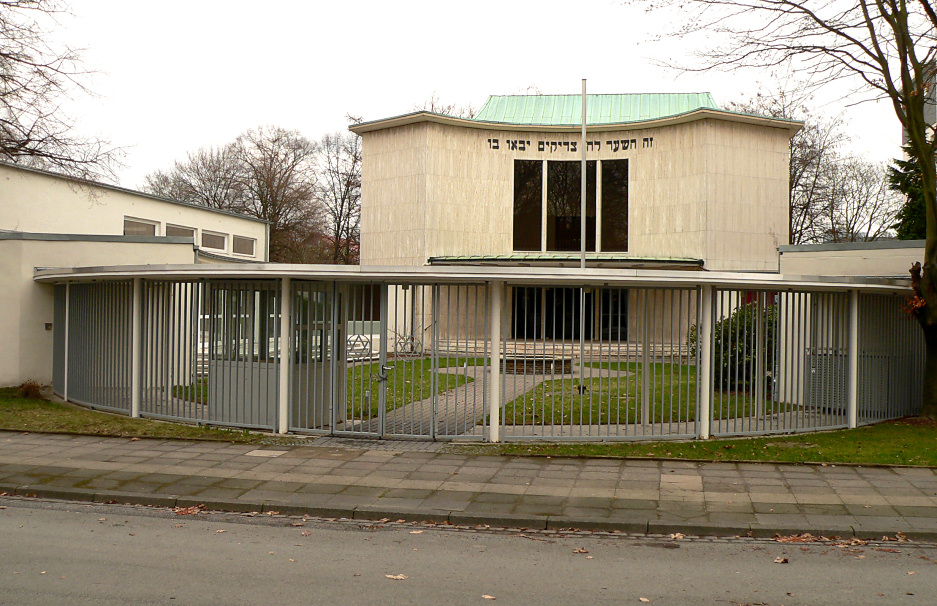
Synagoge der Jüdischen Gemeinde Hannover an der Haeckelstraße im Stadtteil Bult

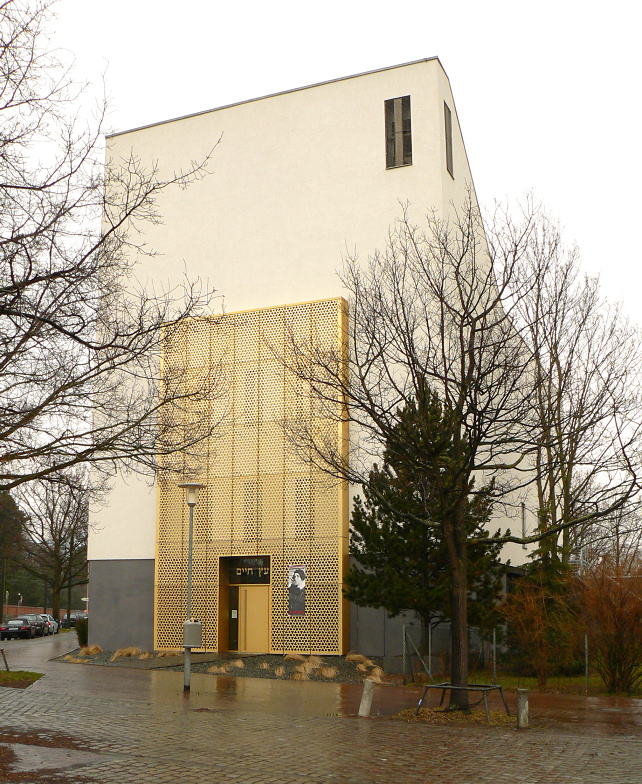
Synagoge der Liberalen Jüdischen Gemeinde Hannover in Leinhausen

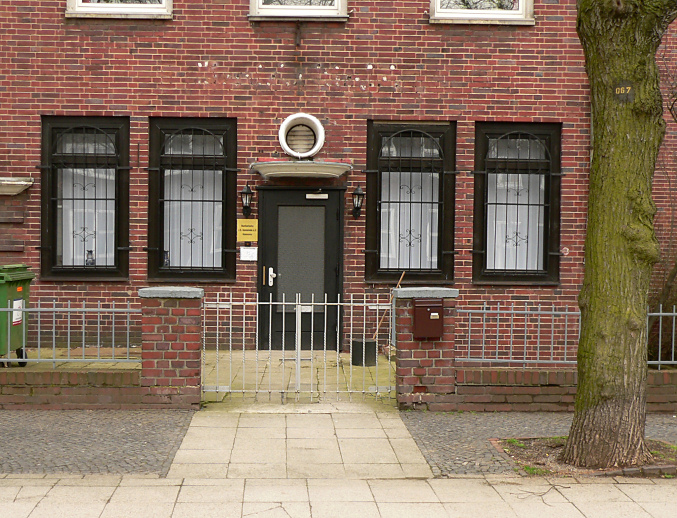
Jüdisch-Sefardisch-Bucharische Gemeinde in Ricklingen

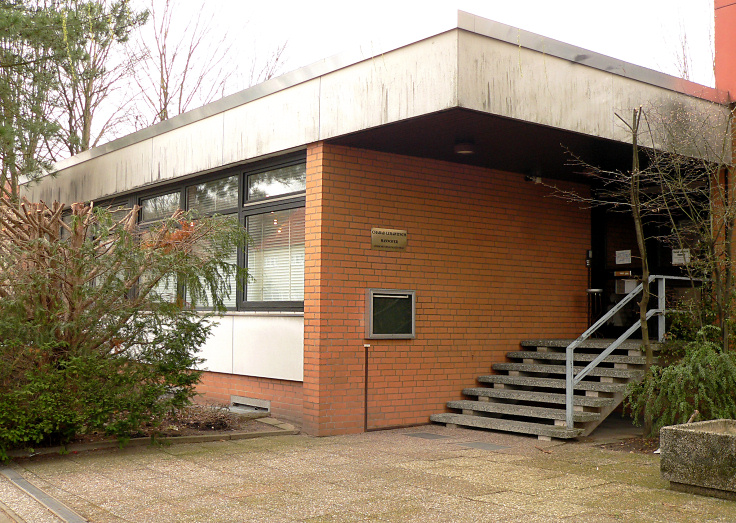
Bildungszentrum von Chabad Lubavitch in Kleefeld

== Cemeteries ==
- Alter Jüdischer Friedhof an der Oberstraße, Mitte des 16. Jahrhunderts bis 1864
- Jüdischer Friedhof An der Strangriede, 1864–1924
- Jüdischer Friedhof Bothfeld, seit 1924
- Friedhof der Liberalen Jüdischen Gemeinde Hannover, 2001–2017 Abteilung des Stadtfriedhofs Lahe, seit 2017 eigenständig
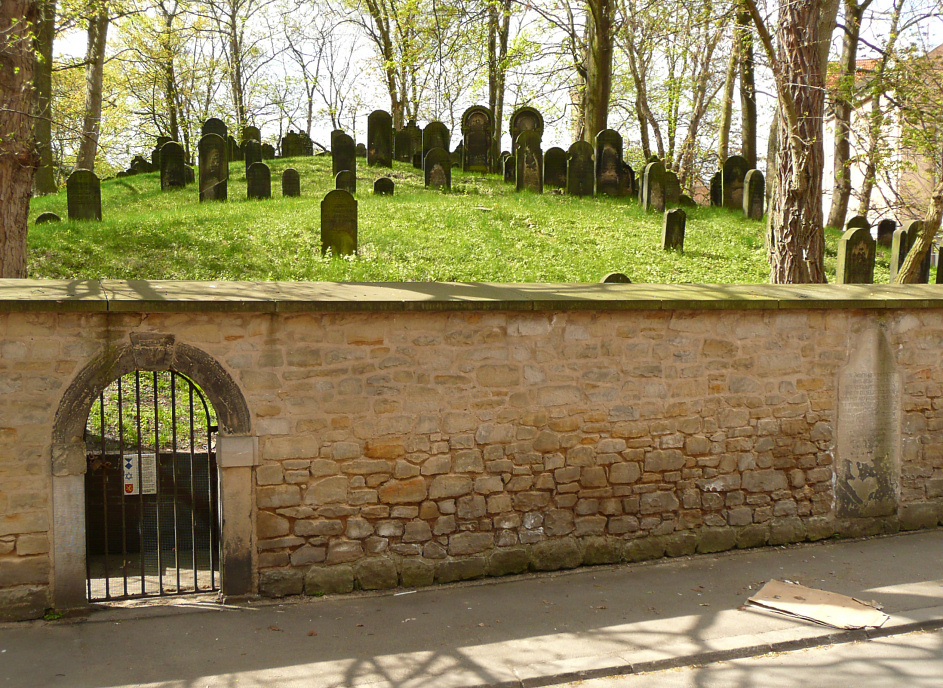
Alter Friedhof an der Oberstraße

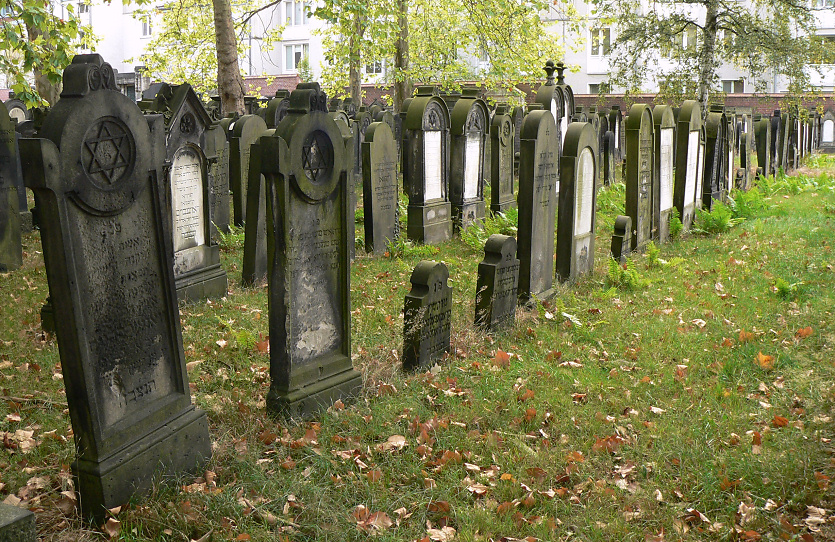
Friedhof an der Strangriede

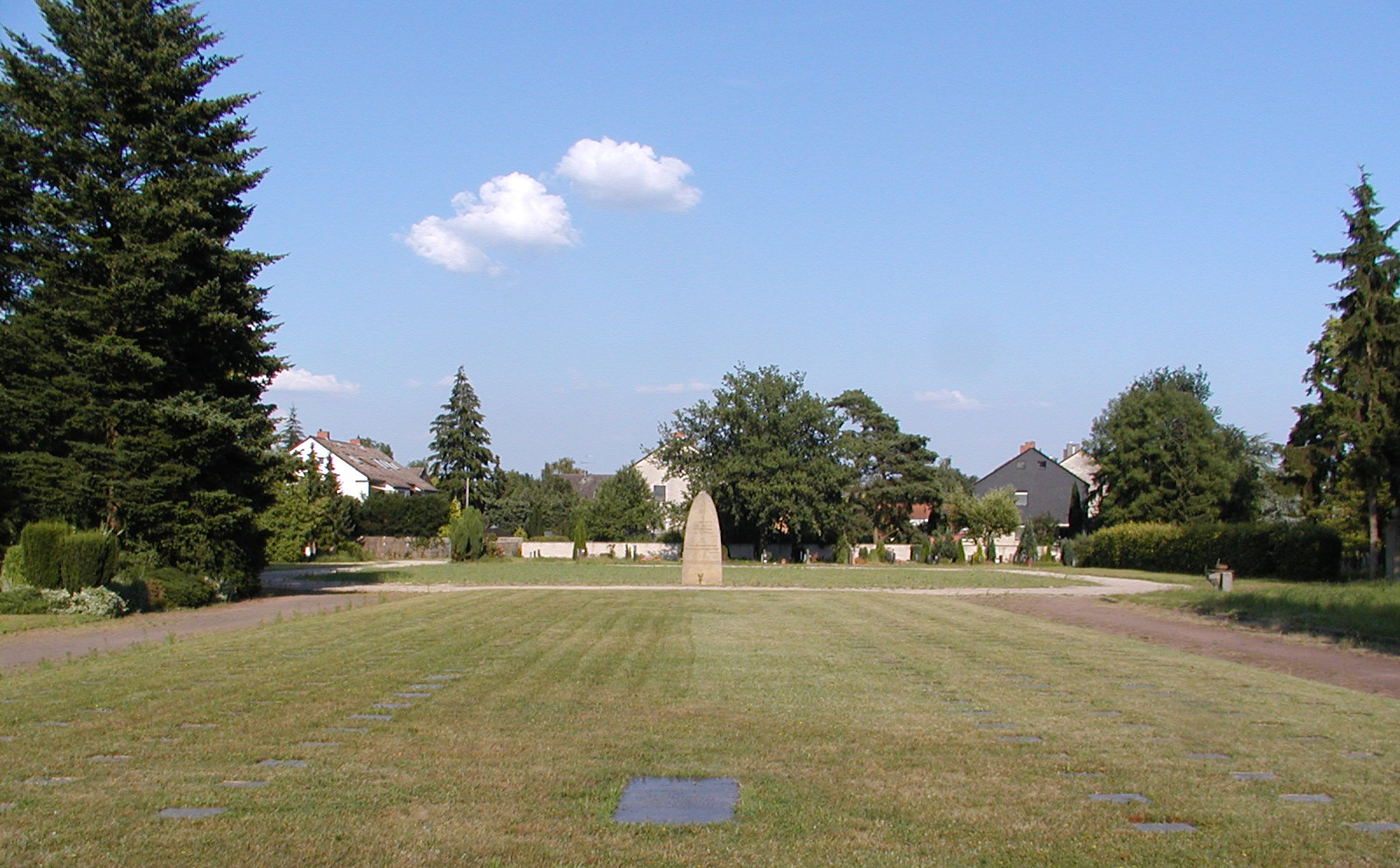
Friedhof in Bothfeld

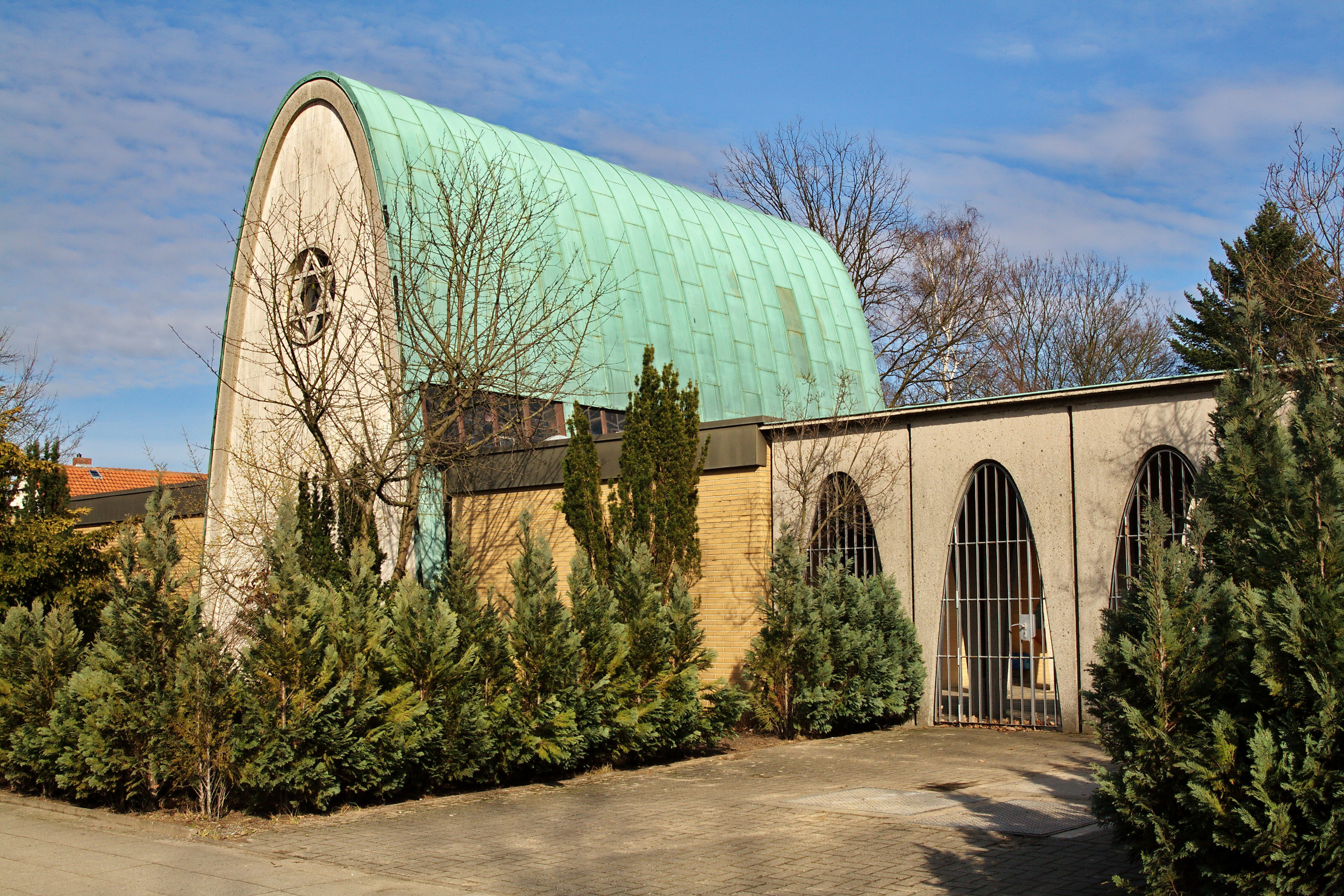
Trauerhalle am Friedhof in Bothfeld

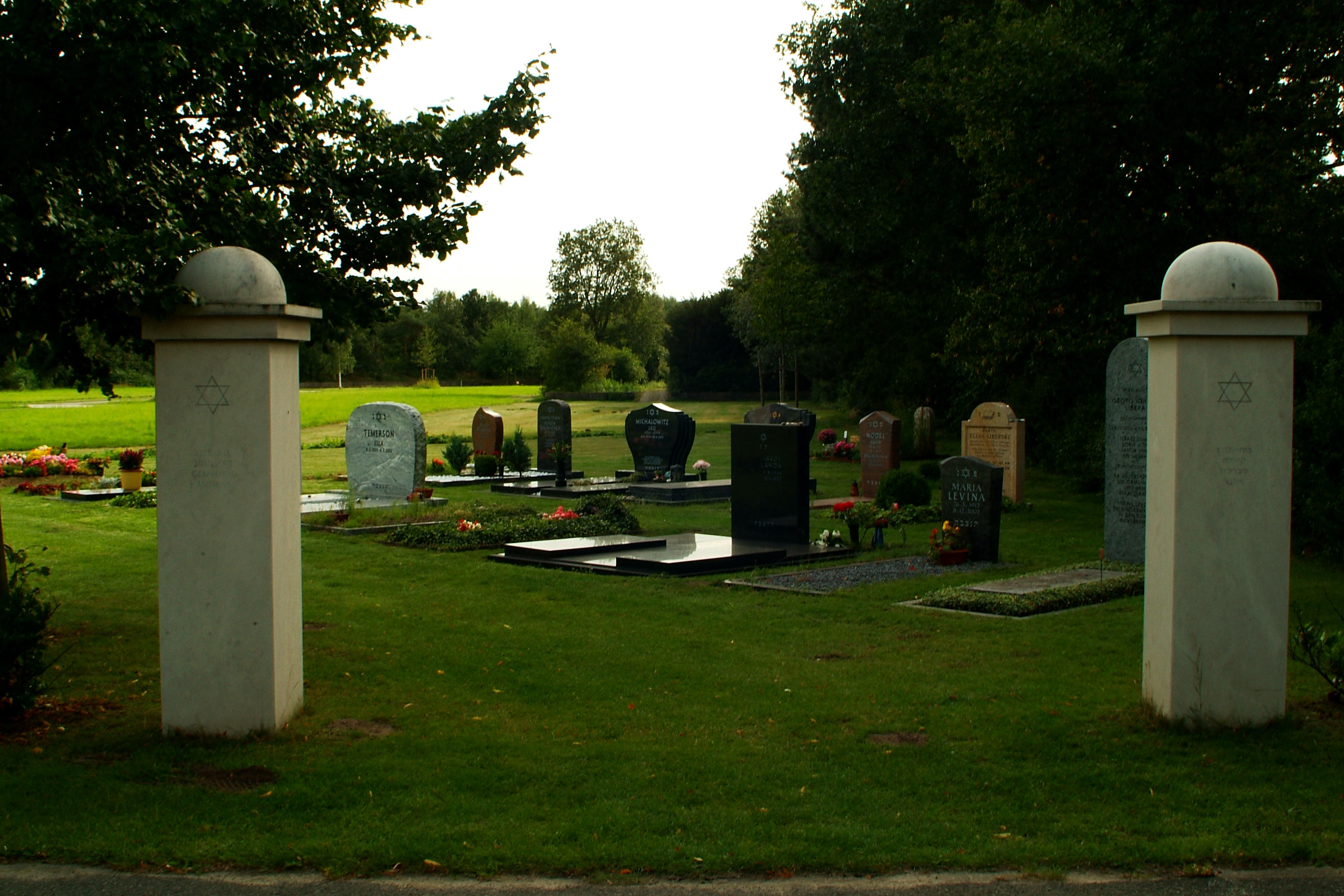
Friedhof der Liberalen Gemeinde

== Key people ==
- Julius Benfey (1836–1900), Bankdirektor und Gemeindevorsteher
- Emil Berliner (1851–1929), Erfinder der Schallplatte und Fabrikant
- Joseph Berliner (1858–1938), Fabrikant
- Samuel Freund (1868–1939), Rabbiner
- Selig Gronemann (1843–1918), Rabbiner
- Kurt Harald Isenstein (1898–1980), Bildhauer, Maler, Kunst- und Musikpädagoge, Schriftsteller
- Andor Izsák (* 6. Juli 1944 in Budapest), Musiker, Gründer des Europäischen Zentrums für jüdische Musik in Hannover
- Iwan Katz (1889–1956), KPD-Politiker
- Werner Kraft (1896–1991), Bibliothekar, Essayist, Schriftsteller, emigrierte 1933/34 aus Hannover nach Jerusalem
- Theodor Lessing (1872–1933), Philosoph und Publizist
- Louis Ephraim Meyer (1821–1894), Bankier, unter anderem Mitbegründer der Braunschweig-Hannoverschen Hypothekenbank und der Hannoverschen Immobilien Gesellschaft
- Erwin Panofsky (1892–1968), Kunsthistoriker, emigrierte 1934 in die USA
- Norbert Prager (1891–1965), war als Überlebender des Holocaust der erste Vorsitzende der jüdischen Gemeinde in Hannover. Er war unter anderem einer der Initiatoren der Gesellschaft für Christlich-Jüdische Zusammenarbeit
- Werner Scholem (1895–1940), 1919 Bürgervorsteher in Hannover-Linden, in der Weimarer Republik Reichstagsabgeordneter für die KPD
- Henry Seligmann (1880–1933), Münzhändler, Mitbegründer der Jüdischen Turnerschaft, Mitglied des Schulvorstandes, Vorsteher des Wohltätigkeitsvereins
- Siegmund Seligmann (1853–1925), erster Generaldirektor der Gummiwerke Continental AG in Hannover
- Ferdinand Sichel (1859–1930), Fabrikant und Gründer der Sichelwerke (Malerleim und Kleister)
- Alexander Moritz Simon (1837–1905), Bankier und Gründer der Israelitischen Gartenbauschule Ahlem
- Eduard Simon (1805–1867), Obergerichtsrat, Mitglied der Advokatenkammer und Erbauer der Villa Simon
- Israel Simon (1807–1883), Bankier und Finanzier des hannoverschen Königs
- Ingrid Wettberg, Vorsitzende der Liberale Jüdische Gemeinde Hannover seit 1999; größte liberale Gemeinde Deutschlands mit erstem Synagogenneubau seit 1945
- Solomon Wolf Zweigenhaft (1915–2005), Rabbiner

== See also ==
- Gedenkbuch – Opfer der Verfolgung der Juden unter der nationalsozialistischen Gewaltherrschaft 1933–1945
- Evangelisch-lutherischer Zentralverein für Begegnung von Christen und Juden e.V.
- Liste der Stolpersteine in Hannover
- Geschichte der Muslime in Hannover

== Literature ==
General

- Selig Gronemann: Genealogische Studien über die alten jüdischen Familien Hannovers. 2 Bände, Lamm, Berlin 1913. Band 1: Genealogie der Familien. urn:nbn:de:hebis:30:1-110833, Band 2: Grabschriften und Gedächtnisworte. urn:nbn:de:hebis:30:1-110826.
- Lesser Knoller: Jahresbericht über die Religions-Schulen I und II der Synagogen-Gemeinde und über den jüdischen Religions-Unterricht an den königlichen und städtischen höheren Knabenschulen zu Hannover. Darin: Mendel Zuckermann: Zur Verwaltungsgeschichte des Hannoverschen Landrabbinats. Riemschneider, Hannover 1910; herunterladbar als PDF-Dokument der Universitätsbibliothek Johann Christian Senckenberg der Johann Wolfgang Goethe-Universität Frankfurt am Main.
- Wilh. Riemschneider: Allgemeine Synagogen-Ordnung für das Königreich Hannover (vom 31. Dezember 1860) nebst der Vollzugs-Ordnung für die Synagogen-Gemeinde zu Hannover (vom Mai 1861 bzw. Juli 1910) und den Vorschriften zur Ausführung der Synagogen- und Vollzugs-Ordnung (vom September 1870). (39 Seiten), Wilh. Riemschneider, Hannover 1916.
- Wolfgang Marienfeld: Jüdische Lehrerbildung in Hannover 1848–1923. In: Hannoversche Geschichtsblätter. Neue Folge Band 36, Heft 1–2, S. 1–107.
- Peter Schulze: Beiträge zur Geschichte der Juden in Hannover. Hannover 1998, ISBN 3-7752-4956-7.
- Peter Schulze: Hannover. In: Herbert Obenaus, David Bankier, Daniel Fraenkel (Hrsg.): Historisches Handbuch der jüdischen Gemeinden in Niedersachsen und Bremen. Band 1, Wallstein-Verlag, Göttingen 2005, ISBN 3-89244-753-5, S. 726–796.
- Peter Schulze: Juden. In: Stadtlexikon Hannover. S. 326ff.
- Waldemar R. Röhrbein (Hrsg.), Hugo Thielen (Bearb.): Jüdische Persönlichkeiten in Hannovers Geschichte. Vollständig überarbeitete, erweiterte und aktualisierte Neuauflage. Lutherisches Verlagshaus, Hannover 2013, ISBN 978-3-7859-1163-1.

Special Themes

- TM: Spurensuche. Was geschah mit der jüdischen Bevölkerung Hannovers nach der Machtergreifung 1933? In: Stadtkind hannovermagazin. Ausgabe 9/2013, September 2013, S. 44–47.
- Julia Berlit-Jackstien, Karljosef Kreter (Hrsg.): Abgeschoben in den Tod. Die Deportation von 1001 Hannoveranerinnen und Hannoveranern am 15. Dezember 1941 nach Riga. Ausstellungskatalog zur gleichnamigen Ausstellung vom 15. Dezember 2011 bis 27. Januar 2012 im Neuen Rathaus. (Reihe Schriften zur Erinnerungskultur in Hannover, Bd. 1). Hannover 2011, ISBN 978-3-7752-6200-2.
- Marlis Buchholz: Die hannoverschen Judenhäuser: Zur Situation der Juden in der Zeit der Ghettoisierung und Verfolgung 1941 bis 1945. Hildesheim 1987, ISBN 3-7848-3501-5.
- Marlis Buchholz: Die Versteigerung des Besitzes deportierter Juden 1941/42. In: Niedersächsisches Jahrbuch für Landesgeschichte. Bd. 73, Hannover 2001, ISSN 0078-0561, S. 409–418.
- Die Frage der Judenmission. In: Dirk Riesener: Volksmission – Zwischen Volkskirche und Republik. 75 Jahre Haus kirchlicher Dienste – früher Amt für Gemeindedienst –– der Evangelisch-lutherischen Landeskirche Hannovers. Lutherisches Verlagshaus, Hannover 2012, ISBN 978-3-7859-1080-1, S. 494–499.
- Peter Hertel: Die Juden von Ronnenberg. Teil 1: 1700-1933, Hrsg.: Stadt Ronnenberg, Schriften zur Stadtentwicklung, Bd. 4, Ronnenberg 2012.
- Peter Hertel und Christiane Buddenberg-Hertel: Kirche und Synagoge, in: Die Juden von Ronnenberg – Eine Stadt bekennt sich zu ihrer Vergangenheit, Hrsg.: Region Hannover (Mahn- und Gedenkstätte Ahlem). Hannover 2016, ISBN 978-3-7752-4903-4, S. 22–24.
- Landeshauptstadt Hannover, Presseamt, Jüdische Gemeinde Hannover (Hrsg.): Leben und Schicksal. Zur Einweihung der Synagoge in Hannover. Hannover 1963, DNB-IDN 452735483.
- Netzwerk Erinnerung und Zukunft in der Region Hannover (Hrsg.): Orte der Erinnerung: Wegweiser zu Stätten der Verfolgung und des Widerstands während der NS-Herrschaft in der Region Hannover. Hannover 2007, DNB-IDN 986937738.
- Hans Otte: Vergesst nie! Hannovers zerstörte Synagoge und ihre Gedenkstätte in der Roten Reihe. Veränderte Neuaufl. Informations- und Pressestelle der Evang.-luth. Landeskirche Hannovers, Hannover 2003, OCLC 249351171.
- Anke Quast: Nach der Befreiung. Jüdische Gemeinden in Niedersachsen seit 1945 – das Beispiel Hannover (= Veröffentlichungen des Arbeitskreises Geschichte des Landes Niedersachsen (nach 1945). Bd. 17). Wallstein, Göttingen 2001, ISBN 978-3-89244-447-3 (Vorschau).
- Mirjam Reisner: Jüdische Friedhöfe in Hannover in: Ohlsdorf – Zeitschrift für Trauerkultur (Online)
- Rotraut Ries: Jüdisches Leben in Niedersachsen im 15. und 16. Jahrhundert (= Veröffentlichungen der Historischen Kommission für Niedersachsen und Bremen. Band 35; Quellen und Untersuchungen zur allgemeinen Geschichte Niedersachsens in der Neuzeit. Band 13). Hrsg. von der Historischen Kommission für Niedersachsen und Bremen. Hahn, Hannover 1994, ISBN 3-7752-5894-9, zugleich Dissertation, Universität Münster.
- Peter Schulze: Deportationen von Juden. In: Klaus Mlynek, Waldemar R. Röhrbein (Hrsg.) u. a.: Stadtlexikon Hannover. Von den Anfängen bis in die Gegenwart. Schlütersche, Hannover 2009, ISBN 978-3-89993-662-9, S. 124.
- M.[eir] Wiener: Liepmann Cohen und seine Söhne, Kammeragenten zu Hannover, in: Monatsschrift für Geschichte und Wissenschaft des Judenthums, Hrsg.: Oberrabbiner Z.[acharias] Frankel, Jahrgang 13, Heft 5, Breslau 1864, S. 161–184.
