= Château du Tertre =

Winery in the Bordeaux region of France

Coordinates: 45.00593°N 0.68090°W

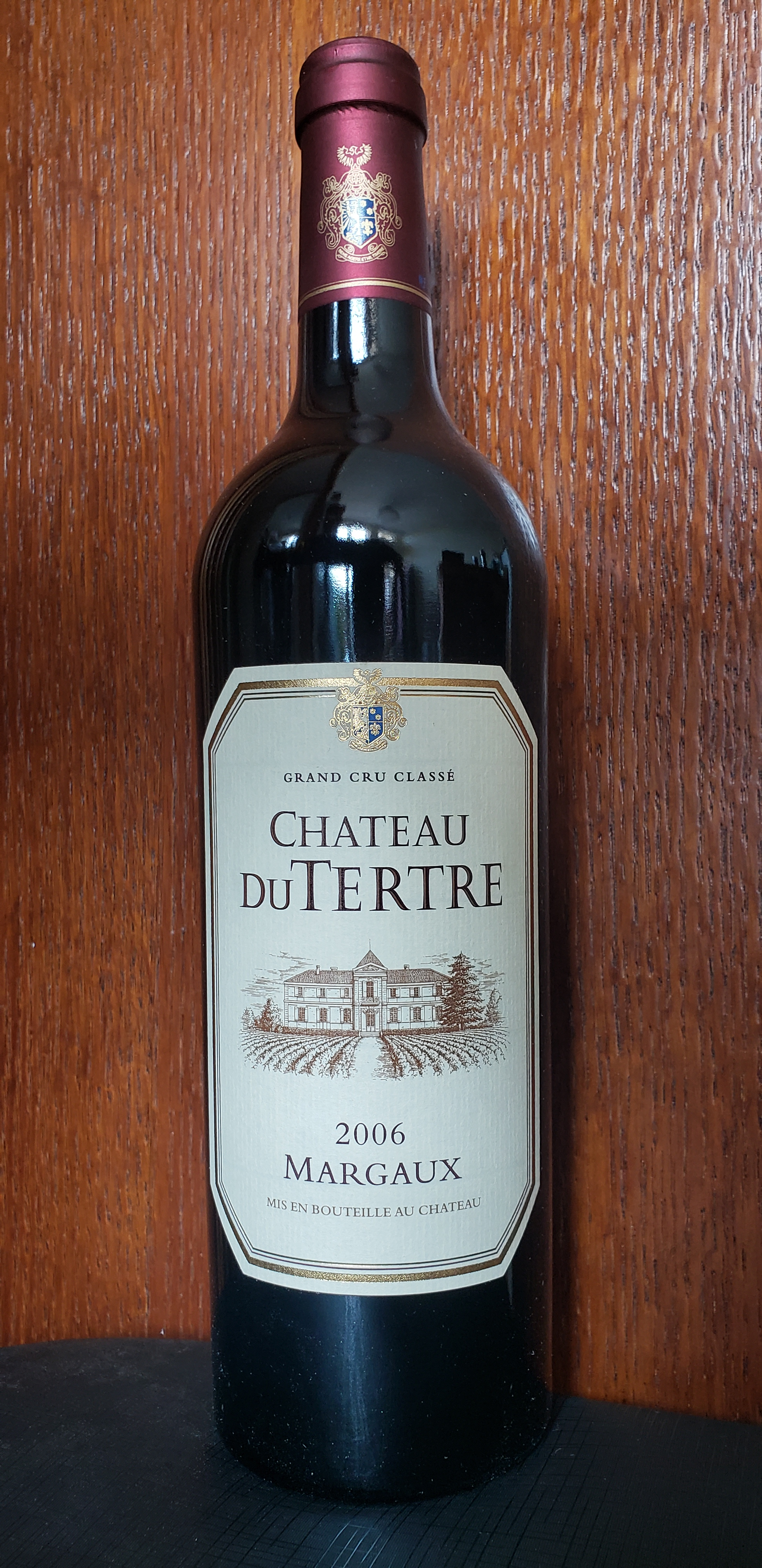
Grand vin of 2006

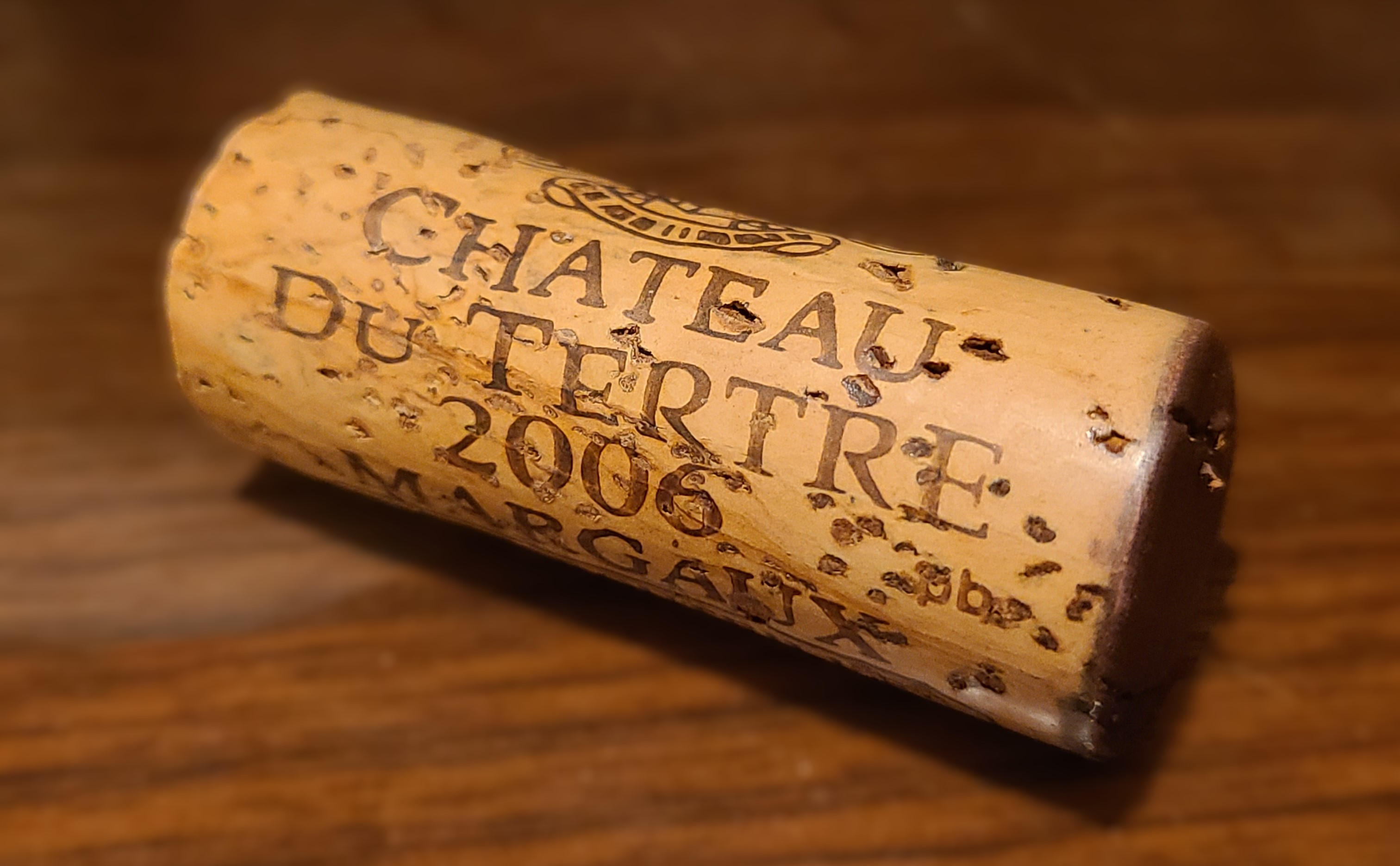

Château du Tertre, or Le Tertre, is a winery in the Margaux appellation of the Bordeaux region of France, in the commune of Arsac. The wine produced here was classified as one of eighteen Cinquièmes Crus (Fifth Growths) in the Bordeaux Wine Official Classification of 1855.

== History ==
Located on the tertre (French for "hillock" or "rising ground") from which it takes its name, the ancient origins of Château du Tertre are traced back to the Seigneurie d'Arsac documented as early as 1143 whose descendants owned the estate in the 16th century. Le Tertre passed through the ownership of the Arrérac family and Marquis de Ségur until the 1855 classification. When the estate was owned by Charles Henri, Le Tertre hold a good reputation and was in demand on the Dutch market. It was sold to Jonas von Königswarter of Vienna in 1870 see Königswarter family under whose son Henri de Koenigswarter's ownership Le Tertre's reputation increased further.

By World War II the reputation and production had diminished, but in 1961 Château du Tertre was acquired by Philippe Gasqueton, who restored the vineyards and château with the backing of Belgian business partners. Following Gasqueton's death in 1995 his widow sold the property to Eric and Louise Albada Jelgersma, owners of the neighbouring estate Château Giscours. In 1997, Eric Albada Jelgersma bought the estate and invested in the large-scale overall restructuring, thus returning its former noble personality to the Chateau du Tertre.

== Production ==
From an 80 hectare estate, the vineyard area extends approximately 50 hectares consisting of the grape varieties of 40% Cabernet Sauvignon, 35% Merlot, 20% Cabernet Franc and 5% Petit Verdot, with vines averaging about 35 years.

The estate also makes a second wine, "Les Hauts du Tertre".
