= Isaac Gastfreund =

19th century Galician rabbi and scholar

Isaac Gastfreund (c. 1845 - after 1880, Vienna) was a Galician rabbinical scholar.

He was the author of Toldot Rabbi Akiva, a biography of the Tanna Rabbi Akiva (Lemberg, 1871; see Ha-Shaḥar, ii.399-400), and of the German work Mohamed nach Talmud und Midrash (issued in parts, Berlin, 1875; Vienna, 1877–80; see Sprenger in Z.D.M.G. xxix.654-659).

He also wrote in Hebrew a biography of the Königswarter family entitled Toledot Bet Königswarter (Vienna, 1877); Anshe Shem, biographies of Jonathan Eybeschütz and Solomon Munk (Lyck, 1879); and Toledot Yellineḳ, a biography of Adolph Jellinek (Brody, 1880).
