= Katharina Schratt =

Austrian actress

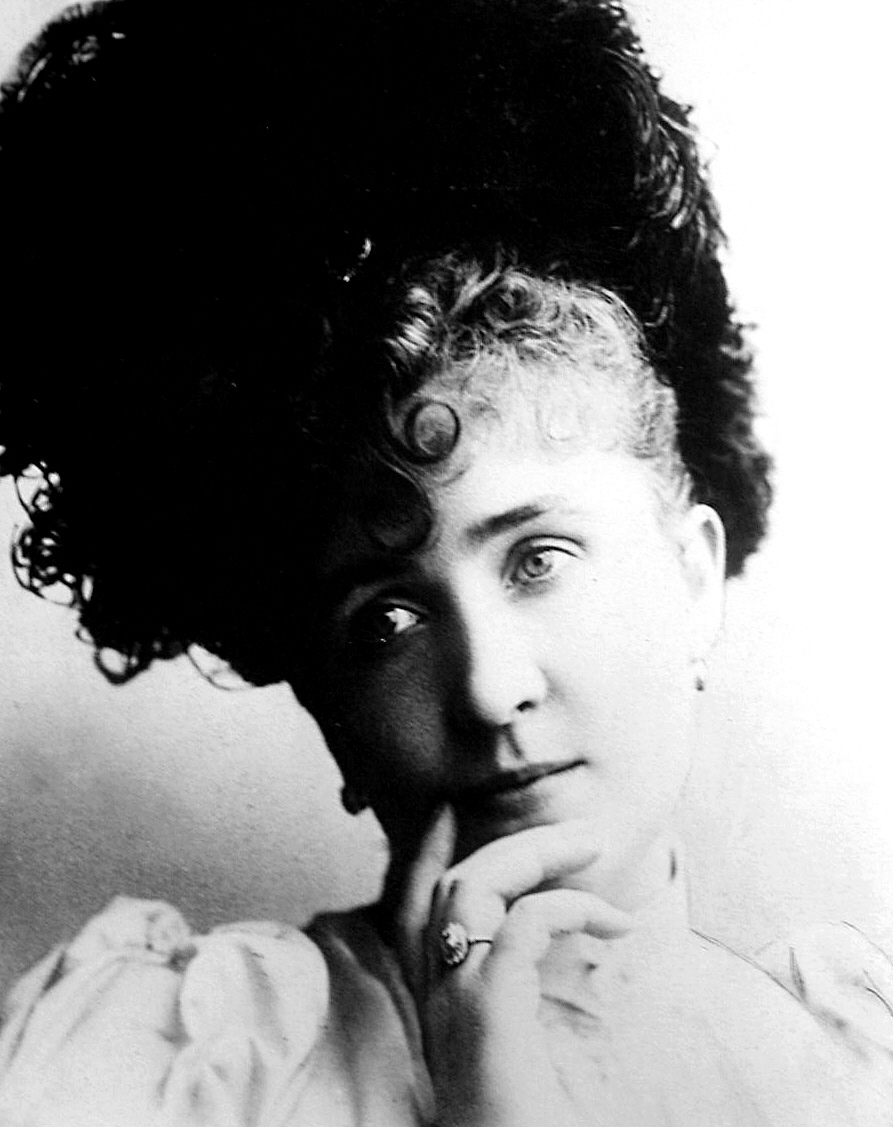
- Born: 11 September 1853; Baden bei Wien, Austrian Empire
- Died: 17 April 1940 (aged 86); Vienna, Nazi Germany
- Occupation: Actress
- Years active: 1871–1900
- Spouse: Nikolaus Kiss de Ittebe (m. 1879; died 1909)

Katharina Schratt, Baroness Kiss von Ittebe (11 September 1853 – 17 April 1940) was an Austrian actress who became "the uncrowned Empress of Austria" as a confidante of Emperor Franz Joseph.

== Life ==
Katharina Schratt was born in Baden bei Wien, the only daughter of stationery dealer Anton Schratt (1804–1883); she had two brothers. From the age of six, she took an interest in theatre. Her parents tried to discourage her from becoming an actress and sent her to a boarding school in Cologne, however, this only increased her ambition. She finally was allowed to take acting lessons in Vienna and made her debut at the age of 17 in her hometown.

=== Acting career ===
In 1872, she joined the ensemble of the Royal Court Theatre in Berlin, achieving considerable success in a short time. Schratt left Germany after only a few months, following the call of the Viennese to join their City Theatre. Her performance made her a leading lady of the Viennese stage.

Schratt toured overseas, and appeared in New York City, after which she returned permanently to Vienna's Hofburgtheater. She was one of Austria's most popular actresses until she retired in 1900, following disagreement with theatre director Paul Schlenther.

=== Marriage and issue ===
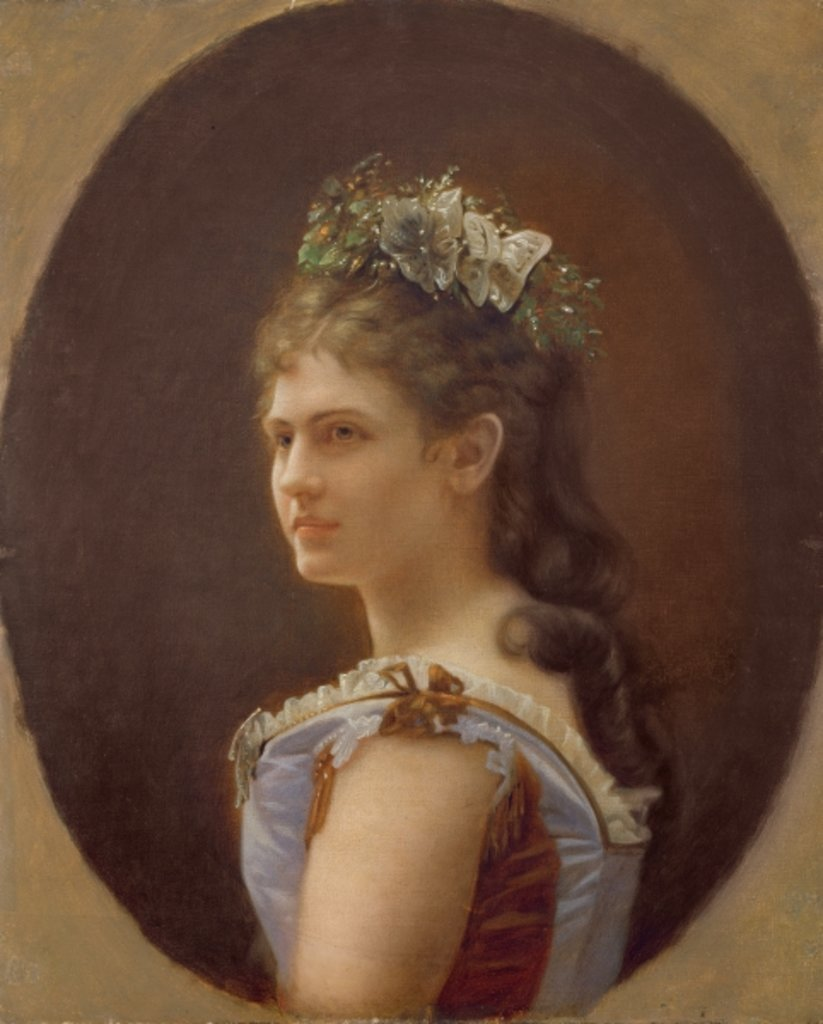
Katharina Schratt (Schauspielerin) (around 1870–1875) by an Unknown artist

In 1879 she married the Hungarian magnate and consular officer Nikolaus, Baron Kiss von Ittebe (1852–1909), and gave birth to a son, Anton Kiss von Ittebe (1880–1970). Soon after, Schratt and her husband separated due to incompatibility.

=== Royal friend and confidante ===
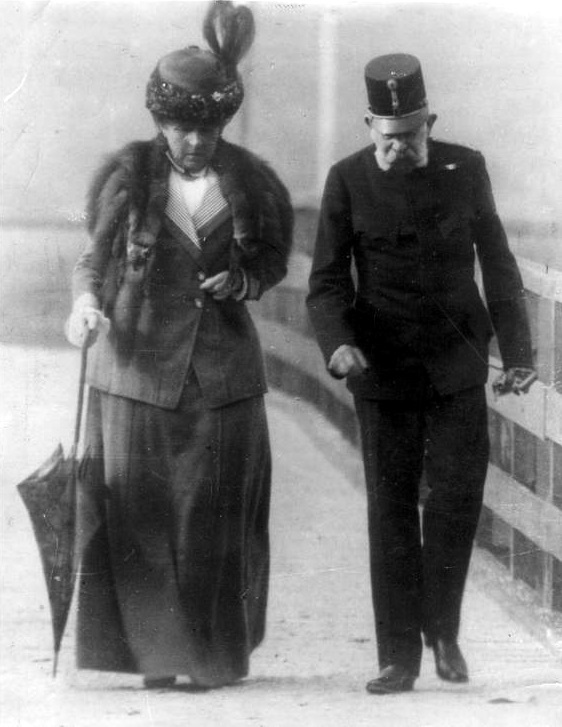
Schratt with Emperor Franz Joseph, about 1910

Schratt's appearances and performances in the early 1880s at Hofburgtheater captivated Franz Joseph, and she was invited to perform for visiting Czar Alexander III of Russia at Kremsier Castle. She soon became Franz Joseph's companion but there is no solid evidence that it was anything but platonic. It is said that Franz Joseph's wife Empress Elisabeth actually encouraged the relationship between the actress and the Emperor, including the commissioning of a portrait of Schratt.

After Elisabeth's assassination in 1898, their relationship continued, with one interruption (1900/01, due to a difference in opinions), until the emperor's death in November 1916. She was rewarded with a generous lifestyle including a mansion on Vienna's Gloriettegasse 9, near Schönbrunn Palace and a mansion in Bad Ischl. In addition, her gambling debts were paid by him. Upon her husband's death in 1909, she also inherited Palais Königswarter, a three-story palace on Vienna's Kärntner Ring boulevard, just across from the State Opera.

Schratt was a friend of notable men such as Count Johann Nepomuk von Wilczek or Prince Ferdinand I of Bulgaria. Schratt became the Emperor's close companion and confidante for 34 years, but whether their relationship was sexual remains disputed.

She denied insinuations she was his mistress. In the 1930s, journalists bothered her to talk about her relationship with the late Emperor. Book companies asked her to write her memoirs, however Schratt would always say, "I am an actress not a writer and I have nothing to say, for I was never a Pompadour, still less a Maintenon."

=== Later years and death ===
After the death of Franz Joseph, she lived completely withdrawn in her palace on the Kärntner Ring. In her later years, Schratt became deeply religious. She visited Emperor Franz Joseph's and Empress Elisabeth's tomb in the Kapuzinergruft daily. The former actress also loved animals and donated money to animal shelters. She died in 1940 at the age of 86. She was buried at Hietzing Cemetery in Vienna.

== Filmography ==
- The War of the Oxen (1920)
