= Jules de Koenigswarter =

French soldier and diplomat of Jewish descent

French Ambassador to Peru
- In office April 1961 – 1966

French Ambassador to Indonesia
- In office July 1957 – 1959

Personal details
- Born: Jules Adolphe de Kœnigswarter; 7 March 1904 Paris, France
- Died: 15 February 1995 (aged 90) Málaga, Spain
- Spouses: Nadine Lise Raphäel (m. 1930; died 1932) Pannonica Rothschild (m. 1935; div. 1956) Madeleine Le Forestier (after 1956)
- Parent(s): Louis de Koenigswarter; Jeanne Thècle Kauffmann
- Education: École des Mines de Paris
- Occupation: Civil engineer, diplomat
- Awards: Croix de Guerre; Order of Liberation; Légion d'honneur

Baron Jules Adolphe de Kœnigswarter (also Königswarter) (7 March 1904 – 15 February 1995), was a French soldier and diplomat of Jewish descent.

== Early life ==
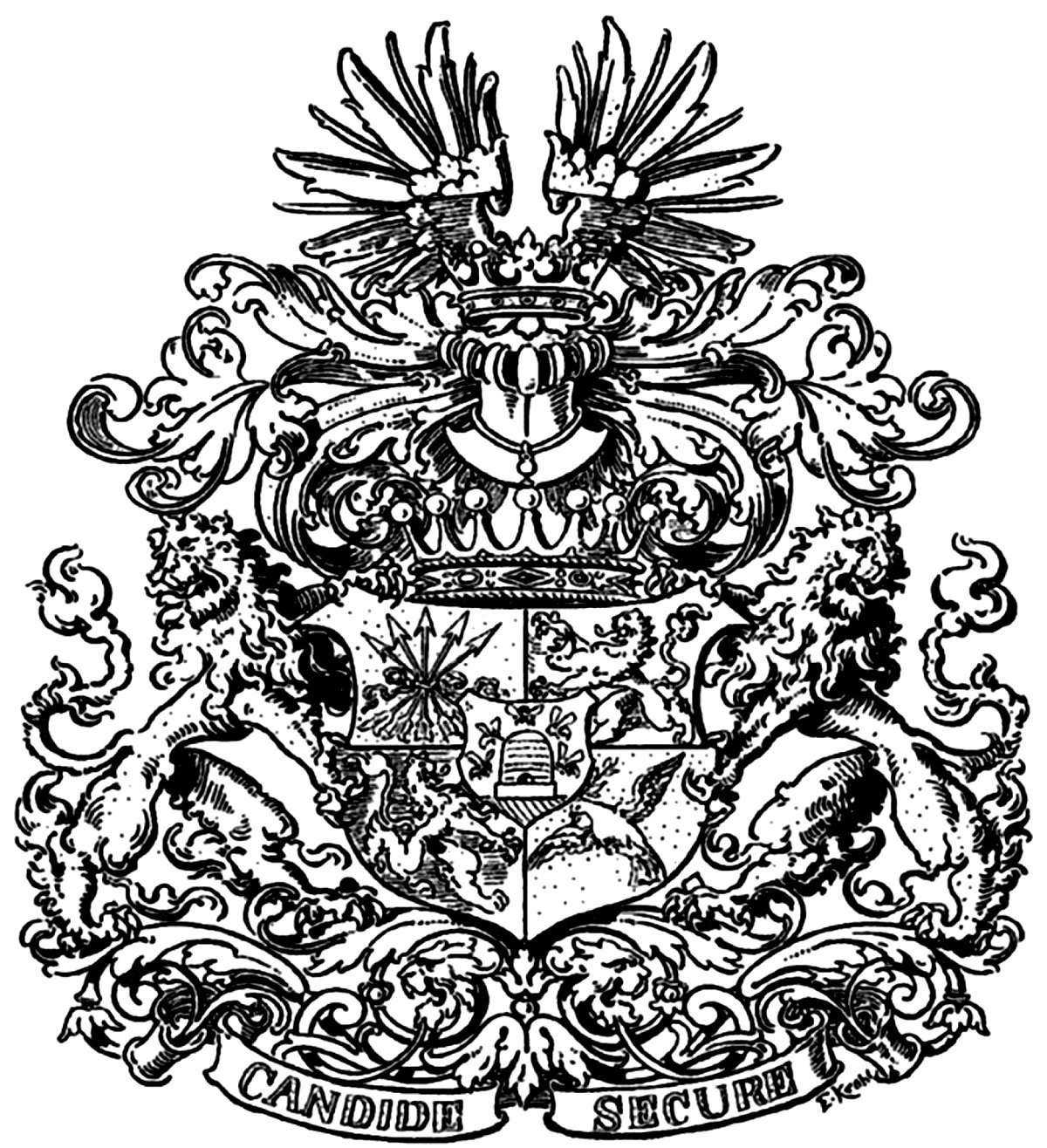
Coat of arms of the Königswarter family

Koenigswarter was born on 7 March 1904 at 22 Rue Galilée in Paris into a large and prominent Königswarter family. He was the son of French banker Baron Louis de Koenigswarter (1870–1931) and Jeanne Thècle (née Kauffmann) de Koenigswarter. His younger sister, Marguerite de Koenigswarter, was married to André Gustave Bicart-Sée.

The Koenigswarter barony had been created in 1870 by Emperor Napoleon III for his great-grandfather, Louis-Jean Koenigswarter, Deputy for the Seine. His paternal grandparents were Jules Louis Maximilien Koenigswarter (son of Louis Jean Kœnigswarter) and Angelica Lea (née Franchetti) Koenigswarter, who was born in Livorno, Italy. One aunt, Alice de Kœnigswarter, was married to composer Fernand Halphen, and another aunt, Hélène Joséphine Koenigswarter, was married to publisher Gaston Calmann-Lévy and, after their divorce, Marie Charles Arnaud Reynard Gilbert, Comte de Choiseul-Praslin. His cousin, Robert Calmann-Lévy, also married into the Rothschild family when he married Jacqueline de Rothschild in July 1930.

== Career ==
He studied at the École des Mines de Paris, becoming a civil engineer. At the outbreak of World War II, Koenigswarter joined the Free French Forces, and led troops in Africa and Europe. During the war, his children Patrick and Janka stayed with the Guggenheim family on Long Island. Much of his extended family perished in the Holocaust, including his mother, who dismissed his entreaties and instructions to escape and was murdered at Auschwitz. For his efforts during the war, he was awarded the Croix de Guerre, the Companion of the Liberation, and was made a Commandeur de la Légion d'honneur.

After the war, he entered the French diplomatic service, first settling with his wife and children in Norway and then in Mexico City (where he was counselor of the French Embassy), before coming to the United States in 1953 as agent general of the French government tourist office in North America. They separated in 1951 and, from 1953 to 1957, he held the position of French Minister Plenipotentiary to the United States and to Canada. In 1957, he became the French Ambassador to Indonesia, followed by the Ambassador to Peru from 1961 to 1966.

Koenigswarter later returned to Paris and a position in the Ministry of Foreign Affairs. Upon his retirement, he moved to Spain where he died in 1995.

== Personal life ==
On 20 October 1930, Koenigswarter was married to Nadine Lise Raphäel (1911–1932), a daughter of Jenny (née Cahn) Raphäel and Maurice Raphäel, a Chevalier de la Légion d'honneur. Through her aunt Flora Raphäel, (the wife of banker David David-Weill, who was chairman of Lazard Frères), she was a first cousin of Pierre David-Weill and Jean David-Weill. They were the parents of one child before Nadine died on 13 May 1932, just twenty years old.

On 15 October 1935, he was married to Kathleen Annie Pannonica "Nica" Rothschild, the youngest child of the late Charles Rothschild (a son of the 1st Baron Rothschild) and Rózsika Edle (née von Wertheimstein) Rothschild. In 1937, they bought and moved to the Château d'Abondant, a 17th century Château in north-west France they acquired from the family of American banker Henry Herman Harjes (who had acquired the château in 1920 from the Duchesse de Vallombrosa). Together, they were the parents of:

- Baron Patrick de Koenigswarter (1936–2017), a businessman and photographer who married socialite Eva Abesamis and lived in the Philippines, where he became a friend and collector of Benedicto Cabrera.
- Janka de Koenigswarter (b. 1938), who became the mother of Steven de Koenigswarter.
- Berit de Koenigswarter (b. 1946)
- Shaun de Koenigswarter (b. 1948)
- Kari de Koenigswarter (b. 1950)

Jules and Nica separated in 1951 and after saxophonist Charlie Parker died at her apartment in the Stanhope Hotel in 1955, Koenigswarter filed for divorce, which was granted in 1956 along with custody of their three minor children. Nica continued to live on her own in New York City, where she was a patroness of the Bebop jazz community.

On 15 March 1956, Baron de Koenigswarter was married to Madeleine Adrienne Emma Le Forestier in New York City. His second wife died in 1988. Baron de Koenigswarter died on 15 February 1995 in Málaga, Spain.
