= Adolph Meyer (banker) =

German banker and industrialist

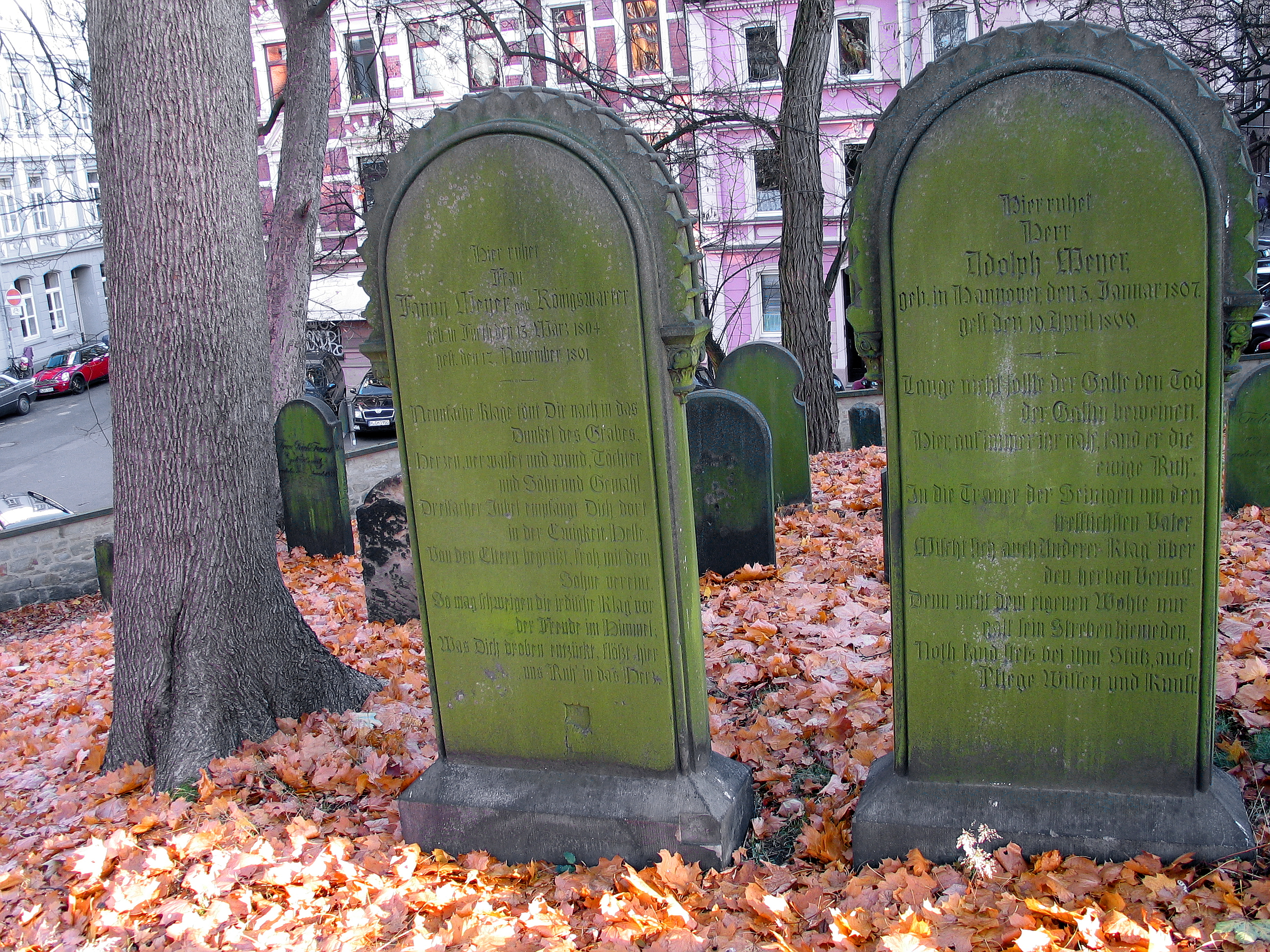
Gravestone of Adolph Meyer and wife Fanny at the Old Jewish Cemetery on Oberstrasse

Adolph Meyer (5 January 1807 – 10 April 1866) was a banker and industrialist in Hannover, Germany.

== Life ==
=== Family ===
Adolph Meyer came from the important Jewish banking family around Simon Meyer from Hanover. His grandfather was Meyer Joseph Schwerin (died in Hannover, 17 December 1796) from Schwerin in Mecklenburg.

Adolph married Fanny Königswarter (13 March 1804 – 12 November 1861; sister of Wilhelm Königswarter and daughter of Fürth banker Simon Königswarter (1774-1854) and Lisette Lämelsfeld (c. 1778–1814), daughter of Lämel Tuschkau and sister of Simon von Lämel). Their children are:

- Lisette (born 1830)
- Bertha (1832–1885)
- Wilhelm (born 1836)
- Charlotte (born 1837)
- Sigmund Meyer (6 February 1840 – 14 July 1911)
- Emil (19 April 1841 – 26 March 1899)
- Friederike (born 1842)
- Albert (born 1844)

== Career and businesses ==
Adolph expanded his father Simon's business and renamed it "Bankhaus Adolph Meyer". The bank, which was built according to his own plans from 1845 to 1848 at Schillerstraße 32, was one of the first commercial buildings in the emerging Bahnhofsviertel (Ernst-August-Stadt). Directed by his son Sigmund from 1866, Bankhaus Adolph Meyer existed until 1938.

In 1828, Meyer established a weaving mill in Linden, which he expanded in 1837 with Alexander Abraham Cohen (brother of Philipp Abraham Cohen), Carl Domeyer and Georg Wessel (1791–1873). In 1831/32 they formed the Mechanische Weberei Linden an der Ihme, the first mechanical cotton spinning mill in the Kingdom of Hanover. After paying off the two business partners in 1853, the company was transformed into a joint stock company in 1858. It produced the well-known "Lindener Samt" (the Ihme Center stands on the site today). Meyer and Cohen retained one-sixth as their own share.

Meyer financed the first Hanoverian factory of Roman cement opened in Hameln in the summer of 1833. In 1845, he bought the brass works in Reher (near Aerzen) and founded a cement factory and a machine factory on the site. Subsequently, he founded a twisting factory, a weaving mill, a bleaching plant and a wool spinning mill there.

In 1848 Meyer acquired Hanoverian citizenship and was elected captain of the Hanoverian Citizen Guard.

From 1853, he and Cohen built the Hannoversche Baumwollspinnerei und -weberei in Linden next to the Mechanische Weberei on the site of today's Linden combined heat and power plant.

In 1854, Meyer had Heinrich Ludwig Debo build the Fannystraße workers' colony not far from the spinning mill, named after the banker's wife.

In 1860, he moved the agricultural machinery factory to Aerzen and founded the Aerzener Maschinenfabrik there in 1864.

== Art collecting and philanthropy ==
Meyer was a patron of the Hanover Art Association and of general and Jewish charities. He was a member of the board of the Jewish community and—as a member of the building commission—promoted the construction of the new synagogue on Bergstraße (which was destroyed by the National Socialists in 1938).

The oldest known amateur photograph of Hanover (as a calotype, print on salt paper in the possession of the Hanover Historical Museum) was taken by Meyer. He photographed Versman's house in Schmiedestraße shortly before its demolition and signed the photo in the negative.

Adolf Meyer and his wife Fanny are buried in the Old Jewish Cemetery on Oberstraßen.

== Literature ==
- Selig Gronemann: Genealogische Studien über die alten jüdischen Familien Hannovers: im Auftrage der Direktion des Wohltätigkeitsvereins (Chewra kadischa) der Synagogengemeinde Hannover an der Hand der Inschriften des alten Friedhofes. Hrsg. Louis Lamm. Berlin 1913, S. 146.
- Ludwig Hoerner (mit einem Beitrag von Franz Rudolf Zankl): Hannover in frühen Photographien 1848–1910. Schirmer-Mosel, München 1979, ISBN 3-921375-44-4, S. 68f.
- Das Buch der alten Firmen der Stadt Hannover im Jahr 1927. Leipzig o. J. (1927), S. 152.
- Albert Lefèvre: Der Beitrag der hannoverschen Industrie zum technischen Fortschritt. In: Hannoversche Geschichtsblätter. Neue Folge 24, 1970, S. 269f.
- Walter Buschmann: Linden. Geschichte einer Industriestadt im 19. Jahrhundert. In: Quellen und Darstellungen zur Geschichte Niedersachsen. Band 75. Hildesheim 1981.
