= Bankhaus Adolph Meyer =

Historic private bank

Coordinates: 52.376104°N 9.738446°E

Bankhaus Adolph Meyer was a private bank, and the oldest in Hanover, Germany. It played a prominent role in the industrialization of Lower Saxony, particularly in the cotton, coal and steel industries, especially since the time of the Kingdom of Hanover. During the Nazi era, it was "Aryanized". It is now located on Schillerstraße at the corner of Rosenstraße in Hanover's Mitte district.

== History ==
=== Since the Middle Ages ===
The origins of the bank date back to the Middle Ages and passed into the hands of the David family in the 17th century. In 1792, Simon Meyer, at that time authorized signatory of the then Bankhaus Meyer Michael David, took over the company, eventually leaving it to his son Adolph Meyer. The bank, then located in an old patrician house along Langestraße in Calenberger Neustadt, was soon renamed Bankhaus Adolph Meyer by Adolph Meyer with his own name.

As the business grew, Adolph Meyer had a new bank building constructed according to his own architectural plans from 1845 to 1850 outside Hanover's former city fortifications on an open field in Ernst-August-Stadt.

In the 1850s and 1960s, the bank played a significant role in the founding of numerous companies under Adolph Meyer, especially after the Kingdom of Hanover joined the German Customs Union.

After Meyer's death, the bank was directed by his sons Emil Meyer and in particular by the Prussian Kommerzienrat Sigmund Meyer, one of the first promoters of the potash salt industry in the province of Hanover. During his lifetime, his son Heinrich Meyer joined the company as co-owner, as did the authorized signatory Ludwig Silberberg.

=== Bank "Aryanizations" in Hanover ===
After Nazis came to power in Germany in 1933, Jewish-owned banks were "Aryanized", that is, transferred to non-Jewish owners. Hanover's oldest private bank suffered a similar fate to the three other Jewish-owned private banks:

- November 1936: Gau economic advisor Julius Albert Maier took over "the customer base and the 'non-Jewish' employees of Bankhaus A. Spiegelberg, which had opened in 1854" - and moved the business premises of his Maier banking firm to Spiegelberg's more prestigious premises in the city centre
- May 1937: seizure of the Bankhaus Hallbaum & Co. and "sämtliche Geschäftsverbindungen und Immobilien von Wilhelm Lilienfeld & Co"
- July 1937: wickelte die Lister Bank Lücke & Co. KG two months later the Bankhaus D. Peretz ab – "und verlegte ihren Firmensitz in dessen ehemalige Geschäftsräume"
- 1938: Gauwirtschaftsberater Julius Maier took over the business of Bankhaus Adolph Meyer

== See also ==
- Aryanization
- The Holocaust
- Anti-Jewish legislation in pre-war Nazi Germany

== Sources ==
- Siedentopf, Paul [in German] (1927). "Bankhaus Adolph Meyer". Das Buch der alten Firmen der Stadt Hannover im Jahr 1927 (in German). Leipzig: Jubiläums-Verlag Walter Gerlach. p. 152.

== General references ==
- Zeitschrift des Gewerbevereins für das Königreich Hannover, Neujahrsnummer 1862
- Albert Lefèvre: Der Beitrag der hannoverschen Industrie zum technischen Fortschritt. In: Hannoversche Geschichtsblätter, Neue Folge 24 (1970), S. 269f.
- Rainer Slotta: Technische Denkmäler in der Bundesrepublik Deutschland, Teil 3 (fälschlicherweise als Nr. 17 bezeichnet): Die Kali- und Steinsalzindustrie, in der Reihe Veröffentlichungen aus dem Deutschen Bergbau-Museum Bochum, hrsg. vom Deutschen Bergbau-Museum, Bochum, Bochum: Deutsches Bergbau-Museum, 1980, ISBN 3-921533-16-3, S. 276
- Walter Buschmann: Linden. Geschichte einer Industriestadt im 19. Jahrhundert, zugleich Dissertation 1979 an der Universität Hannover, in der Reihe Quellen und Darstellungen zur Geschichte Niedersachsens, Bd. 92, Hildesheim: Lax, 1981, ISBN 3-7848-3492-2, S. 80–83 u.ö.
- Mlynek, Klaus; Röhrbein, Waldemar R., eds. (2009). Hannover City Lexicon. From the beginnings into the present (in German). Hanover: Schlütersche Verlagsgesellschaft. ISBN 978-3-89993-662-9. OCLC 458691668. OL 45212542M. Wikidata Q2327579.
  - Schulze, Peter (2009). "Bankhaus Adolph Meyer". In Mlynek & Röhrbein (2009), p. 47.
