= Alexander Moritz Simon =

German-Jewish philanthropist (1837–1905)

Alexander Moritz Simon (originally Moses Simon; November 27, 1837, in Hanover – January 29, 1905, in Hanover) was a German-Jewish philanthropist, a banker and American vice consul. He founded the Israelite horticultural school in Ahlem near Hannover to improve the living conditions of its Jewish citizens.

== Life ==
Moritz Simon was born on November 27, 1837, in Hanover as the son of a major Jewish collector. He was a very diligent student. Following his school career, he completed an apprenticeship as a bank merchant in the bank building of the Hanoverian court banker, Ezechiel Simon.

After his education, Simon went to New York, arriving on July 20, 1858, with the American ship North Star at New York harbor. For several years he worked at the city, in a bank. In 1863 Simon returned to Hanover, after applying on 29 April to the city council for civil rights, listed as a banker, on July 16, 1863, he and his father founded the "Banking, Money Exchange and Debt Collection Business".

On August 7, 1871, he was appointed Vice - Consul at Brunswick. In March 2. 1886 as Consular Agent at Hanover. He retired on December 22, 1890, and was appointed Vice and Deputy Consul at Hanover on October 5, 1893.

Simon was a well-known Jewish philanthropist, seeing the need, he became a vigorous advocate of a new and path-breaking idea, promoted the training of Jewish boys in agriculture and handicrafts. Later, he used his own funds to establish a school based on these principles in Ahlem near Hannover, and gave of his own land for this purpose. The 'Israelitische,' later called 'Jüdische' Gartenbauschule was founded in 1883.
