= Jonas von Königswarter =

Austrian Jewish banker and railway entrepreneur

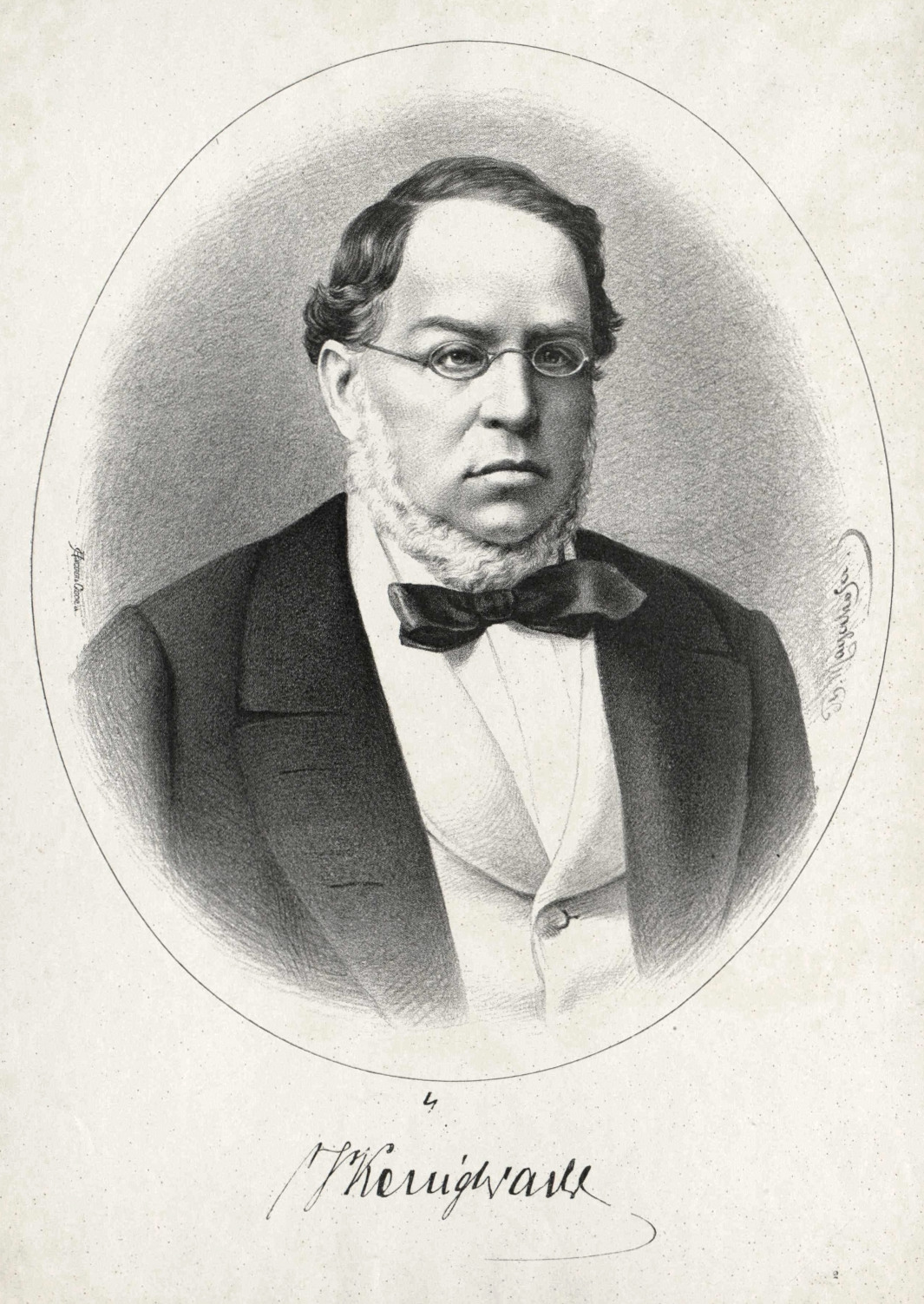
- Born: 10 August 1807; Frankfurt, Confederation of the Rhine
- Died: 23 December 1871 (aged 64); Vienna, Austria-Hungary
- Occupation: Banker
- Spouse: Josefine Pessel
- Children: Moritz von Königswarter (b. 1837)

Jonas Marcus von Königswarter (10 August 1807 – 23 December 1871) was an Austrian Jewish banker and railway entrepreneur. He was a member of the Königswarter family.

Born in Frankfurt shortly after the Napoleon invasion of Germany, Jonas von Königswarter decided to settle in Vienna, where he became the head of the banking-house founded by his uncle Hermann Königswarter, who had left no son. His business prospered; and the bank came to be ranked among the leading institutions of Austria. As a natural consequence, Königswarter was called upon to fill high public offices. In 1838 he became examiner of Austria's central bank Oesterreichische Nationalbank, and in 1850 director of that institution. Later he was elected to a directorship in the Oesterreichische Creditgesellschaft, the Emperor Ferdinand Northern Railway, the Süd-Norddeutsche Verbindungsbahn, and the Böhmische Westbahn, and he served as president of the last-named railroad for many years. He was also a member of the advisory committee of the Wiener Börse, and president of the Jewish congregation of the city.

In recognition of his public services, Königswarter was decorated with the Order of the Iron Crown of the third class, and elevated to an hereditary knighthood; and in 1870 he received the decoration of the second class of the same order, and was raised to the rank of a baron. Königswarter, however, rated far more highly than these distinctions the warm personal esteem with which Emperor Francis Joseph I regarded him.

Königswarter was president of the Jewish community of Vienna in the years 1868 and 1871 as a traditional conservative; he was an early supporter of the Alliance Israélite Universelle.

He and another Ringstrasse patron, Gustav von Epstein were buried in the Wahring Jewish Cemetery.

== Extrernal links ==
Media related to Jonas von Königswarter at Wikimedia Commons
