= Rózsika Rothschild =

Hungarian tennis player and member of the prominent Rothschild family

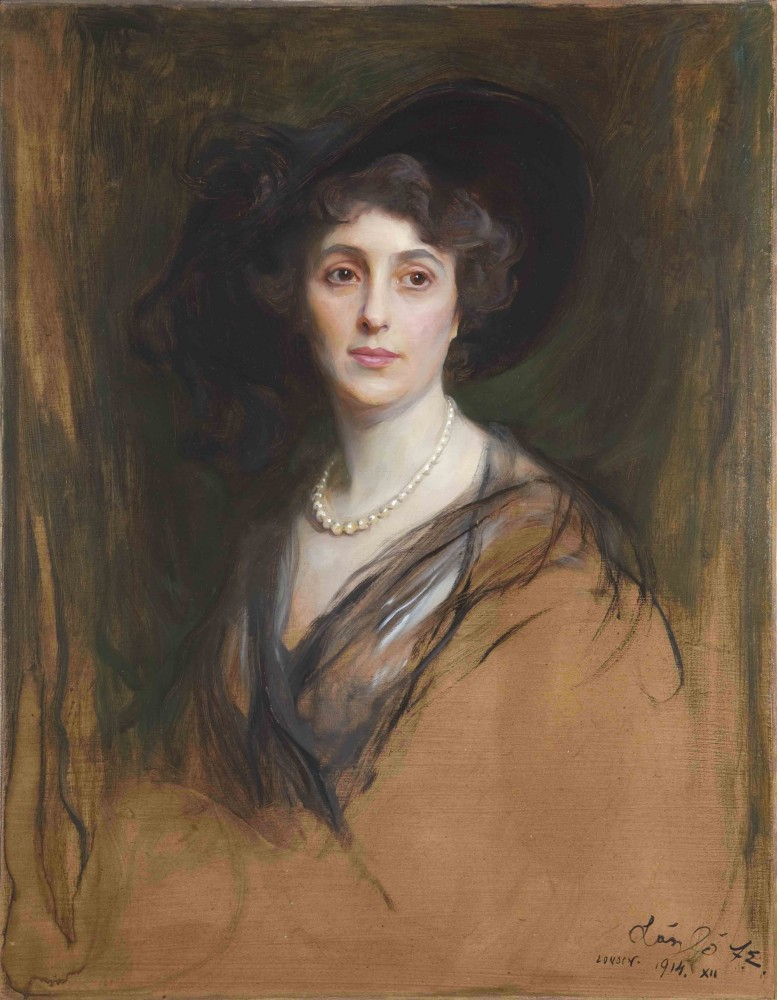
- 1914 portrait
- Born: Rózsika Edle von Wertheimstein; 15 October 1870; Nagyvárad, Austria-Hungary
- Died: 30 June 1940 (aged 69)
- Spouse: Charles Rothschild (1907–1923; his death)
- Children: Elizabeth Charlotte Rothschild "Liberty"; Miriam Rothschild; Elizabeth Charlotte Rothschild; Victor Rothschild, 3rd Baron Rothschild; Pannonica Rothschild

Rózsika Rothschild (born Rózsika Edle von Wertheimstein; 15 October 1870 in Nagyvárad, Austria-Hungary – 30 June 1940 in London) was a tennis player and the wife of the banker and entomologist Charles Rothschild.

== Life ==
She was born as Rózsika Edle von Wertheimstein in Nagyvárad (now Oradea, Romania) in the Austro-Hungarian Empire. She grew up as one of seven children of an officer of the Austro-Hungarian Army, Alfred Edler von Wertheimstein. The Wertheimstein family was very wealthy and one of the first Jewish families in Europe to be ennobled without having previously converted to Christianity.

The multilingual Rózsika was regarded as very interested in politics. Miklós Bánffy, Hungary's foreign minister following World War I, later praised Wertheimstein's intellect, influence and efforts to support Hungary as it struggled to preserve its territories, which he detailed in his memoir The Phoenix Land :

“Her help was invaluable as for many years she had held a unique position in London… as a result of her husband’s illness, she was running the affairs of the Rothschild Bank herself. Then, and later, we could always depend on her help in any matter concerning Hungary.”

She was married in Vienna on 6 February 1907 to Charles Rothschild, son of Nathan Mayer Rothschild, 1st Baron Rothschild from the English branch of the very wealthy banking family Rothschild, whom she had met during a butterfly excursion in the Carpathians (other sources indicate that it was a tennis court in Karlsbad). The couple lived on his estate in Tring, Hertfordshire.

Rózsika Rothschild was the one who drove the relationship between Chaim Weizmann and the Rothschilds. She was struck by the young chemist [and Zionist leader] Weizmann and wrote in one of her essays: “I love fanatics and idealists. I find them highly attractive. Chaim Weizmann is both.” She saw the potential in him and supported his cause. She was the one who brought it to her husband Charles, and his brother Lord Walter Rothschild. In 1917 the Balfour Declaration stating Britain’s support for a ″Jewish homeland″ in Palestine was addressed to Lord Walter Rothschild and she played critical role in bringing about the declaration.

After the early death of her husband in 1923, she raised her four children.

== Children ==
- Elizabeth Charlotte Rothschild "Liberty" (1909–1988), who suffered from schizophrenia
- Miriam Louisa Rothschild (1908–2005), zoologist
- Victor Nathaniel Mayer Victor Rothschild (1910–1990), biologist, intelligence officer during World War II, cricket player and Labour Party member
- Kathleen Annie Pannonica Rothschild (1913–1988), named Nica, and after her marriage Baroness Pannonica de Koenigswarter, worked as a codebreaker for Gaullist intelligence, jazz patron
