= Palais Königswarter =

Building in Vienna, Austria

Coordinates: 48.2018°N 16.3703°E

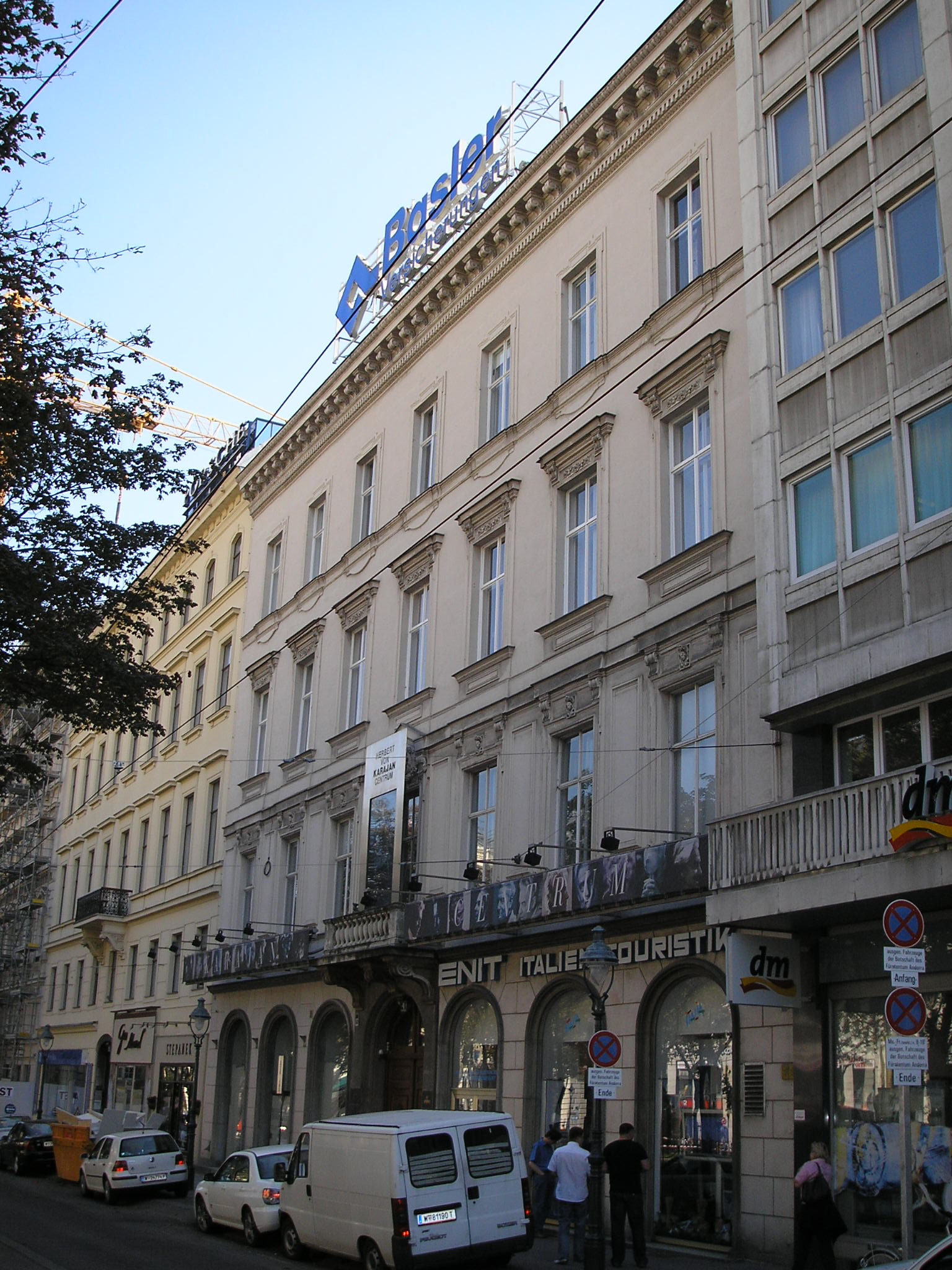
Palais Königswarter.

Palais Königswarter is a Ringstraßenpalais in Vienna, Austria. It was built for the aristocratic Königswarter family.
