= Königswarter family =

Bohemian Jewish noble family

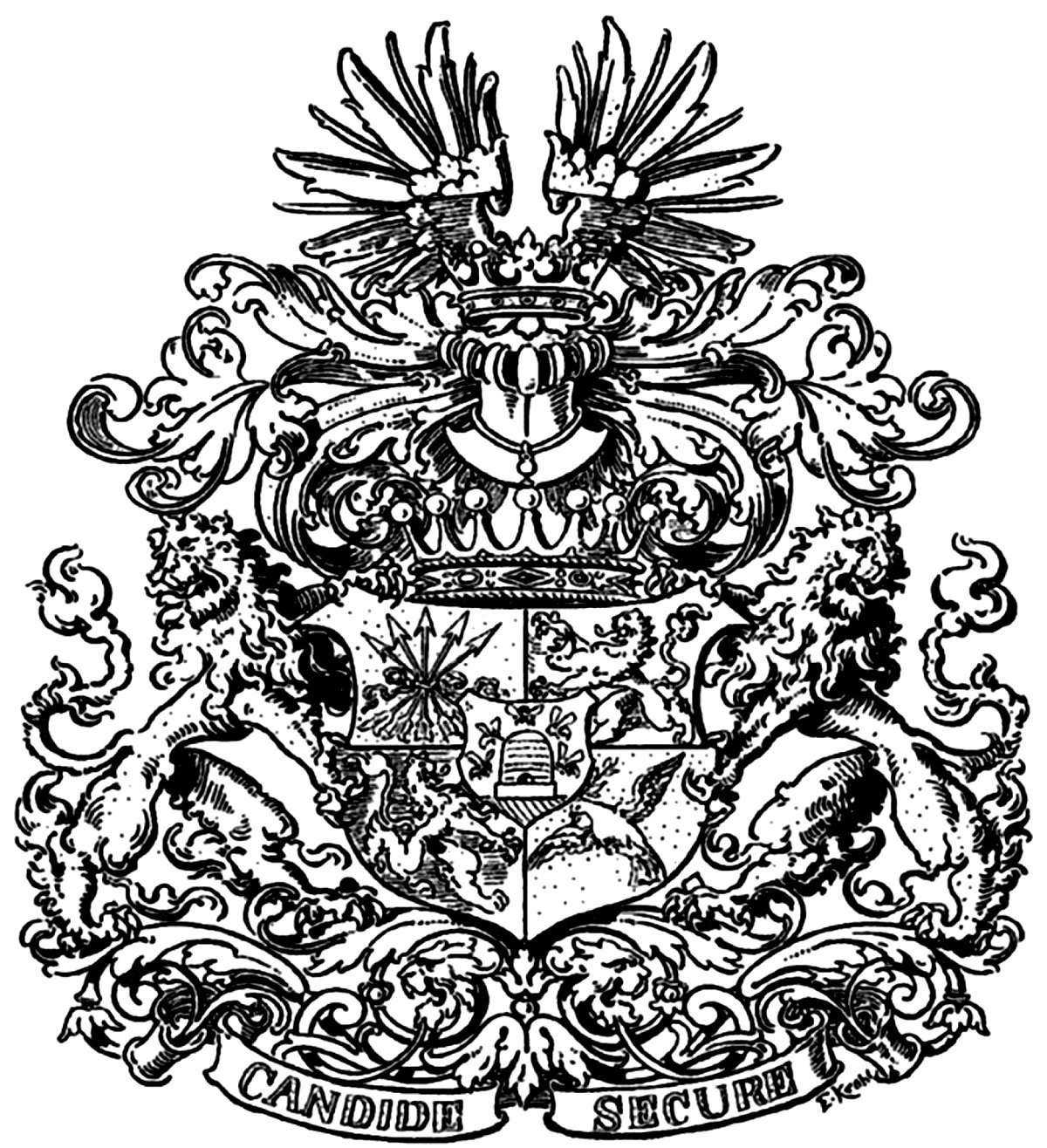
Coat of arms of the Königswarter family

The Königswarter family (French: Kœnigswarter) is a Jewish Austrian-Hungarian noble family originating from Königswart, Bohemia. In the middle of the eighteenth century, their ancestor Jonas Hirsch Königswarter emigrated to Fürth, Bavaria, where he established a business that made him wealthy. At his death (1805) he left five sons, who founded banking houses successively in Frankfurt, Vienna, Amsterdam, and Hamburg.

== Family tree ==
- Jonas Hirsch Königswarter (c. 1740–1805)
  - Hermann Hirsch Königswarter (1767–1847)
  - Markus Königswarter (1770–1850)
    - Jonas von Königswarter (1807–1871)
      - Fanny von Königswarter (1830–1852)
      - Moritz von Königswarter (1837–1893), married to Charlotte Edle von Wertheimstein (1841–1929)
        - Heinrich Königswarter (1861–1931)
        - Hermann Königswarter (1864–1915)
        - Wilhelm Königswarter (1866–1927)
    - Zacharias Markus Königswarter (1812–1872)
    - Isaac Löw Königswarter (1818–1877)
  - Simon Königswarter (1778–1854), married to Lisette Lämelsfeld von Lämel (c. 1778–1814), sister of Simon von Lämel (1766–1845)
    - Fanny Königswarter (1804–1861), married to Adolph Meyer (1807–1866)
    - Wilhelm Königswarter (1809–1887)
  - Moritz Königswarter (1780–1829)
    - Josefine Königswarter (1811–1861), married to her cousin Jonas von Königswarter
  - Julius Jonas Königswarter (1783–1845)
    - Louis Jean Kœnigswarter (1814–1878)
      - Jules Kœnigswarter (1844–1919)
        - Louis de Kœnigswarter (1870–1931)
          - Jules de Kœnigswarter (1904–1995), married to Pannonica Rothschild (1913–1988)
        - Hélène Joséphine Kœnigswarter (1873–1922), married to Gaston Calmann-Lévy (1864–1948)
        - Alice de Kœnigswarter (1878–1963), married to Fernand Halphen (1872–1917)
    - Wilhelm Königswarter (1816–1857)
      - Julius von Königswarter (1854–1918)
        - Wilhelm Königswarter (1890–1966)
    - Maximilien-Jules de Kœnigswarter (1817–1878)
      - Maurice de Kœnigswarter (1858–1938)
    - Henri Kœnigswarter (1819–1876)
      - Jules Kœnigswarter (1848–1882)
