= Old Jewish Cemetery, Hanover =

Jewish cemetery in Hanover, Germany

Coordinates: 52°22′54″N 9°43′22″E

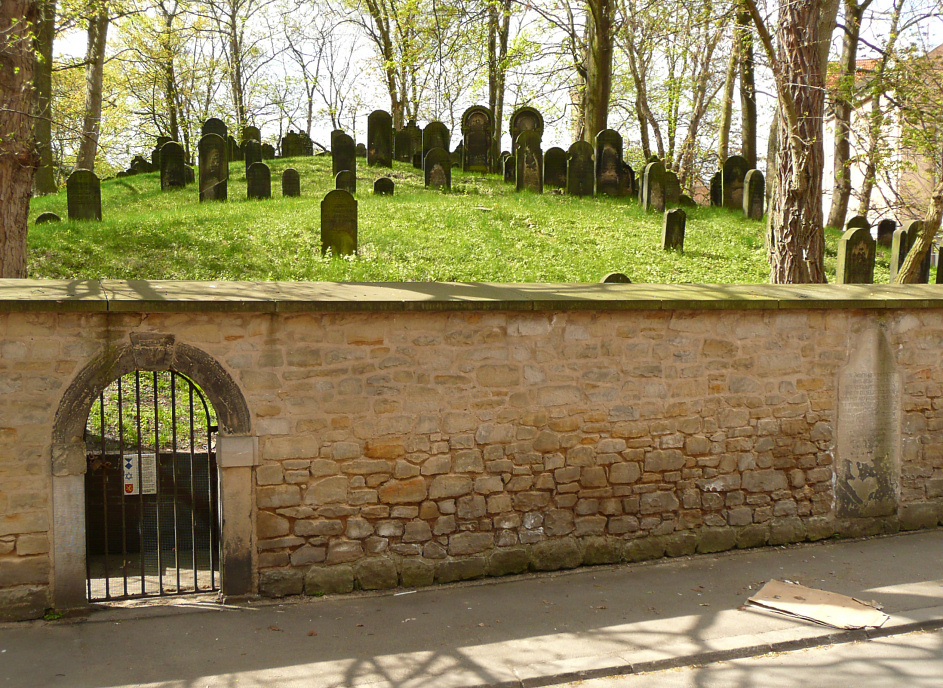
Cemetery as seen from the entrance.

The Old Jewish Cemetery on the Oberstrasse (German: Alter Jüdischer Friedhof an der Oberstraße) is a Jewish cemetery in Hanover. Located on a hill in the city's Nordstadt district, it is the oldest extant Jewish cemetery in Northern Germany. The cemetery contains about 700 graves and was in use from circa 1550 until 1864.
