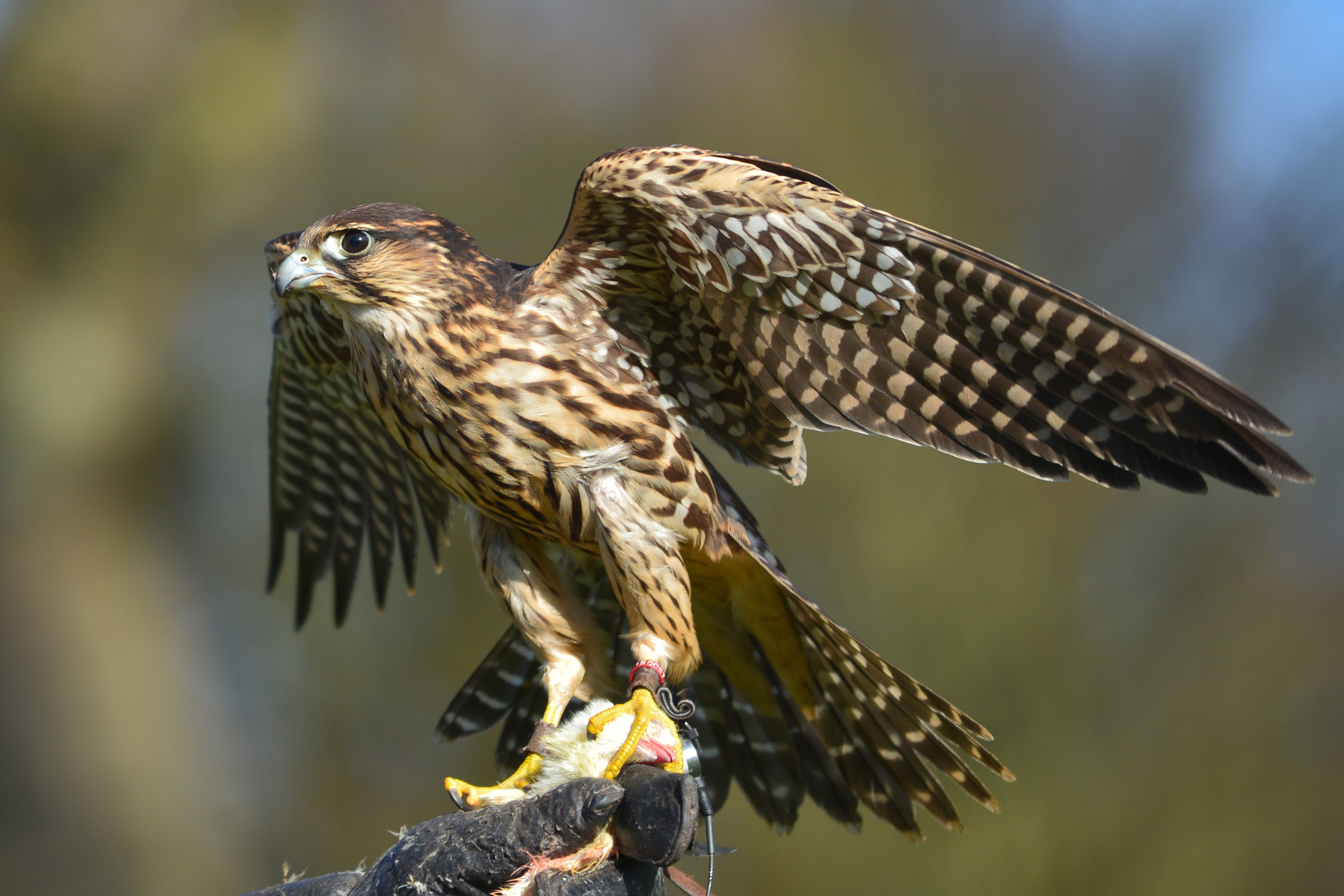
- Young perlin after a falconry training session

Scientific classification
- Domain: Eukaryota
- Kingdom: Animalia
- Phylum: Chordata
- Class: Aves
- Order: Falconiformes
- Family: Falconidae
- Subfamily: Falconinae
- Genus: Falco
- Species: F. peregrinus × F. columbarius

= Perlin (falconry) =

Falconer's term for a hybrid of a peregrine falcon and a merlin

The word perlin is a falconer's term for a hybrid of a peregrine falcon and a merlin. It is much bigger and faster than a merlin, but is not as big as a peregrine, so the quarry it takes varies from larger songbirds to small game birds such as hen pheasants. It is less likely to fly as high as a peregrine and usually rings close to the falconer. As a rule, the peregrine is the father and the merlin is the mother.

Other hybrids may occur, such as 3/4 perlins, where there are three parts peregrine to one part merlin. Hybrids' percentages can be as varied as 50/50 to 7/8 and 15/16 perlins.

== See also ==
- Perilanner
