= Perilanner =

Scientific classification
- Kingdom: Animalia
- Phylum: Chordata
- Class: Aves
- Order: Falconiformes
- Family: Falconidae
- Subfamily: Falconinae
- Genus: Falco
- Species: F. peregrinus × F. biarmicus

Hybrid falcon

The word perilanner is a falconer's term for a hybrid between a peregrine falcon and a lanner falcon. It is larger and faster than a lanner, but does not fly as far as a peregrine and thus is less likely to fly far away and become lost. As a rule, the peregrine is the father and the lanner is the mother. Perilanners are a popular choice for modern falconers.

Their flying range is between that of a lanner and that of a peregrine and makes them useful in keeping an airport clear of wild birds to prevent birdstrike.

== See also ==
- Perlin
