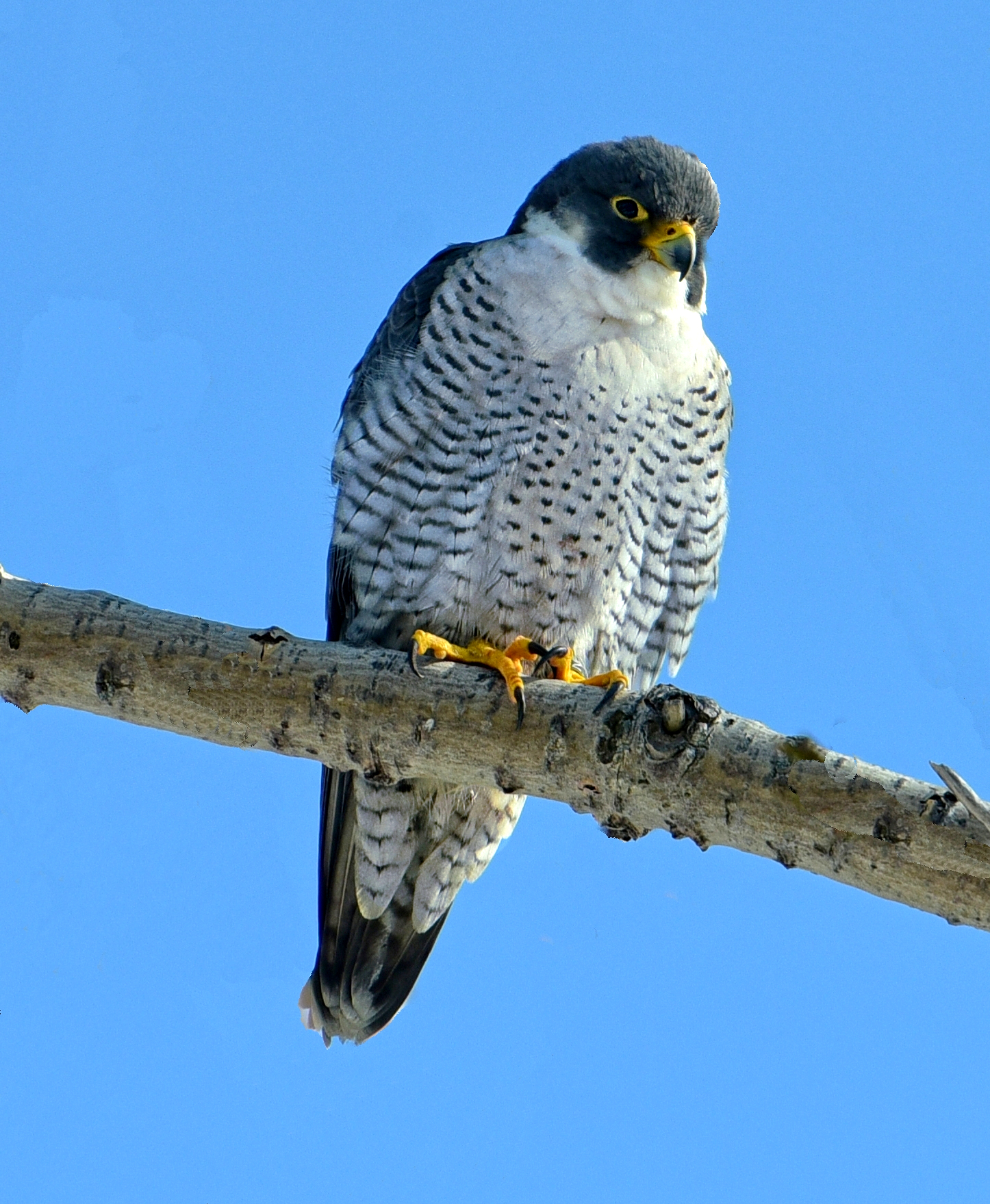
- Male in Toronto, Ontario

Conservation status
- Least Concern (IUCN 3.1)
- CITES Appendix I

Scientific classification
- Kingdom: Animalia
- Phylum: Chordata
- Class: Aves
- Order: Falconiformes
- Family: Falconidae
- Genus: Falco
- Species: F. peregrinus

Binomial name
- Falco peregrinus Tunstall, 1771

Subspecies
- 18–19, see text
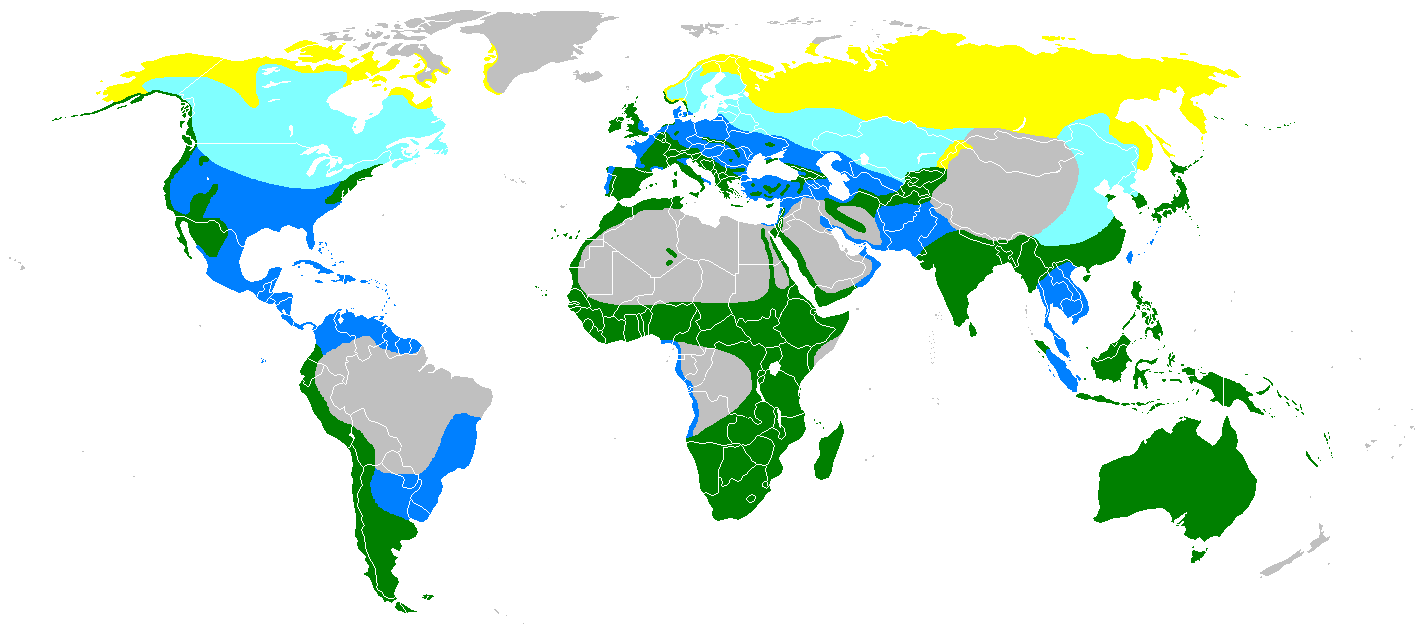
- Global range of F. peregrinus Breeding summer visitor Breeding resident Winter visitor Passage visitor

Synonyms
- Falco atriceps Hume; Falco kreyenborgi Kleinschmidt, 1929; Falco pelegrinoides madens Ripley & Watson, 1963; Rhynchodon peregrinus Tunstall, 1771

= Peregrine falcon =

Fastest known animal and common bird of prey

The peregrine falcon (Falco peregrinus), sometimes referred to simply as the peregrine, is a bird of prey (raptor) in the family Falconidae known for its speed. A large, crow-sized falcon, it has a blue-grey back, barred white underparts and a black head. As is typical for bird-eating (avivore) raptors, peregrine falcons are sexually dimorphic, with females being considerably larger than males. Historically, the bird has also been known as the "black-cheeked falcon" in Australia and the "duck hawk" in North America.

The breeding range includes land regions from the Arctic tundra to the tropics. It can be found nearly everywhere on Earth, except extreme polar regions, very high mountains, and most tropical rainforests. The only major ice-free landmasses from which it is entirely absent are the islands of New Zealand, making it the world's most widespread raptor and one of the most widely found wild bird species. In fact, the only land-based bird species found over a larger geographic area, domestic and feral pigeons, owe their success to human-led introduction. Both are domesticated forms of the rock dove, and are a major prey species for peregrine populations. Due to their greater abundance in cities than most other birds, feral pigeons support many peregrine populations as a staple food source, especially in urban settings.

The peregrine is a highly successful example of urban wildlife in much of its range, taking advantage of tall buildings as nest sites, and an abundance of prey such as pigeons and ducks. Both the English and scientific names of the species mean "wandering falcon", referring to the migratory habits of many northern populations. A total of 18 or 19 regional subspecies are accepted, which vary in appearance. Disagreement existed in the past over whether the distinctive Barbary falcon was represented by two subspecies of Falco peregrinus or was a separate species, F. pelegrinoides, and several of the other subspecies were originally described as species. However, the difference in their appearance is very small, as is their genetic difference, being only about 0.6–0.8% genetically differentiated. That indicates the divergence is relatively recent, occurring during the Last Ice Age, and all major ornithological authorities now treat the Barbary falcon as a subspecies.

Although its diet consists almost exclusively of medium-sized birds, the peregrine will sometimes hunt small mammals, small reptiles, or even insects. Reaching sexual maturity at one year, it mates for life and nests in a scrape, normally on cliff edges or, in recent times, on tall human-made structures. The peregrine falcon became an endangered species in many areas because of the widespread use of various pesticides, especially DDT. Since the ban on DDT from the early 1970s, populations have recovered, supported by large-scale protection of nesting places and releases to the wild.

The peregrine falcon is a well-respected falconry bird due to its strong hunting ability, high trainability, versatility, and availability via captive breeding. It is effective on most game bird species, from small to large. It has also been used as a religious, royal, or national symbol across many eras and civilizations.

== Description ==
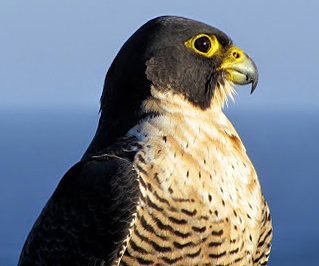
Falco peregrinus. Royal National Park, New South Wales, Australia

The peregrine falcon has a body length of 34 to 58 cm (13–23 in) and a wingspan from 74 to 120 cm (29–47 in). The male and female have similar markings and plumage but, as with many birds of prey, the peregrine falcon displays marked sexual dimorphism in size, with the female measuring up to 30% larger than the male. Males weigh 330 to 1,000 g (12–35 oz) and the noticeably larger females weigh 700 to 1,500 g (25–53 oz). In most subspecies, males weigh less than 700 g (25 oz) and females weigh more than 800 g (28 oz), and cases of females weighing about 50% more than their male breeding mates are not uncommon. The standard linear measurements of peregrines are: the wing chord measures 26.5 to 39 cm (10.4–15.4 in), the tail measures 13 to 19 cm (5.1–7.5 in) and the tarsus measures 4.5 to 5.6 cm (1.8–2.2 in).

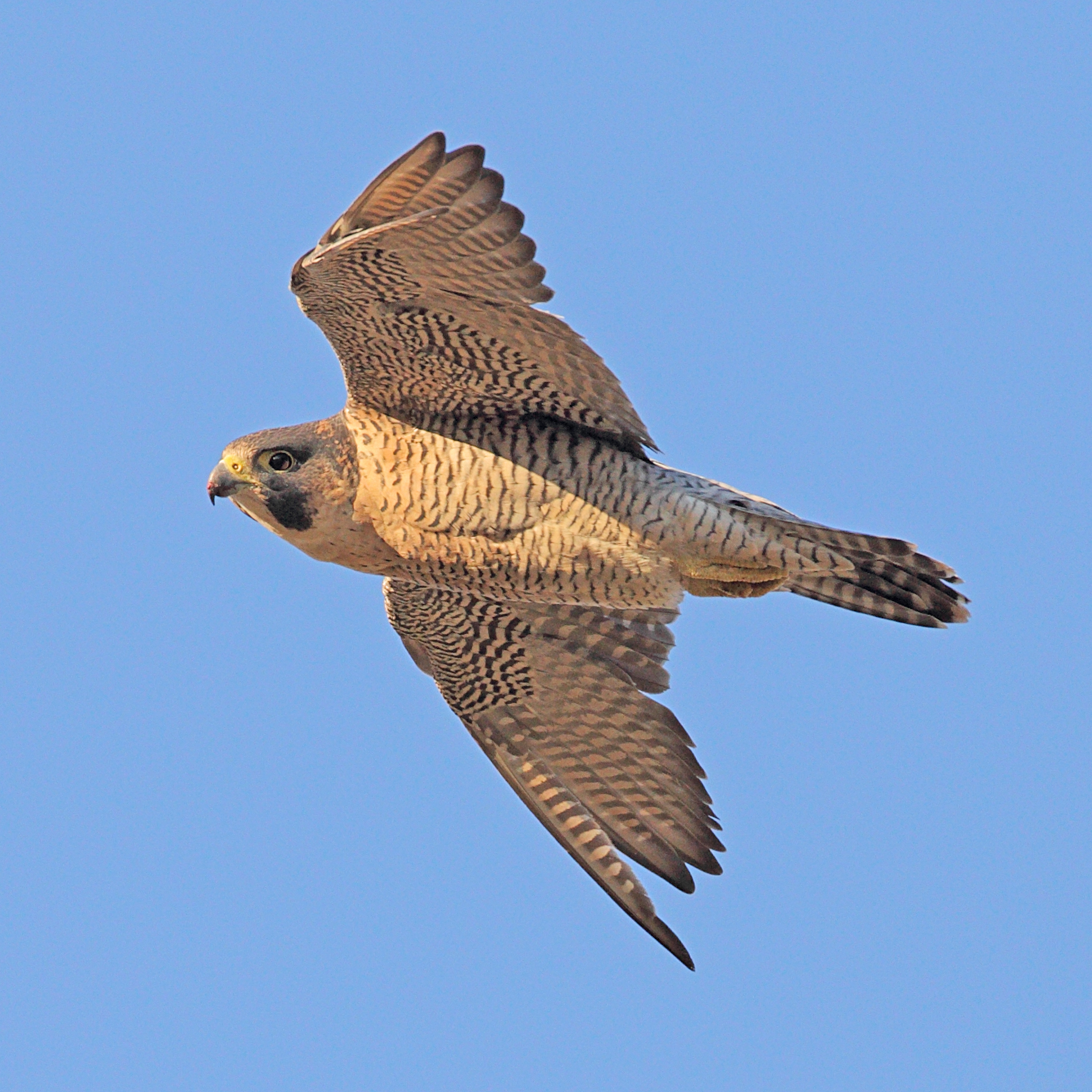
The appearance of a peregrine falcon in flight

The back and the long pointed wings of the adult are usually bluish black to slate grey with indistinct darker barring (see "Subspecies" below); the wingtips are black. The white to rusty underparts are barred with thin clean bands of dark brown or black. The tail, coloured like the back but with thin clean bars, is long, narrow, and rounded at the end with a black tip and a white band at the very end. The top of the head and a "moustache" along the cheeks are black, contrasting sharply with the pale sides of the neck and white throat. The cere is yellow, as are the feet, and the beak and claws are black. The upper beak is notched near the tip, an adaptation which enables falcons to kill prey by severing the spinal column at the neck. An immature bird is much browner, with streaked, rather than barred, underparts, and has a pale bluish cere and orbital ring.

The patch of black feathers below the falcon's eyes is called the malar stripe. A 2021 study of photos from around the world showed that the malar stripe is larger in areas that receive more sunlight, and concluded that the stripe serves to improve the falcon's vision by reducing glare.

== Taxonomy and systematics ==
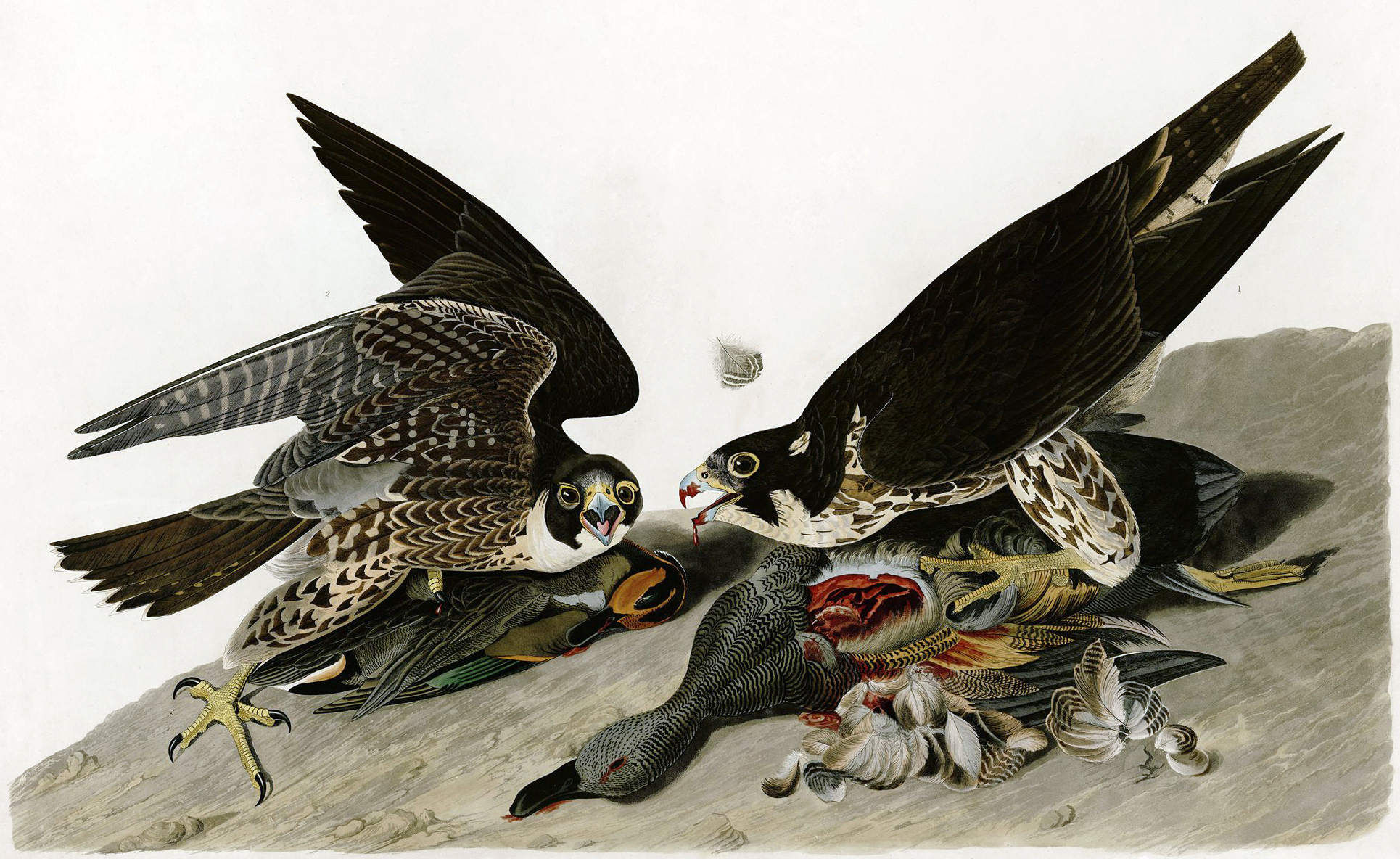
A pair of peregrines eating ducks. Illustration by John James Audubon

Falco peregrinus was first described under its current binomial name by English ornithologist Marmaduke Tunstall in his 1771 work Ornithologia Britannica. The scientific name Falco peregrinus is a Medieval Latin phrase that was used by Albertus Magnus in 1225. Peregrinus is Latin, meaning "one from abroad" or "coming from foreign parts". It is likely the name was used as juvenile birds were taken while journeying to their breeding location (rather than from the nest), as falcon nests are often difficult to get at. The Latin term for falcon, falco, is related to falx, meaning "sickle", in reference to the silhouette of the falcon's long, pointed wings in flight.

The peregrine falcon belongs to a genus whose lineage includes the hierofalcons (Note: Contra Helbig et al. 1994, Wink et al. 1998. The supposed basal position of the hierofalcons was due to them having a cytochrome b numt: see Wink & Sauer-Gürth 2000) and the prairie falcon (F. mexicanus). This lineage probably diverged from other falcons towards the end of the Late Miocene or in the Late Pliocene, about 3–8 million years ago (mya). As the peregrine-hierofalcon group includes both Old World and North American species, it is likely that the lineage originated in western Eurasia or Africa. Its relationship to other falcons is not clear, as the issue is complicated by widespread hybridization confounding mtDNA sequence analyses. One genetic lineage of the saker falcon (F. cherrug) is known to have originated from a male saker ancestor producing fertile young with a female peregrine ancestor, and the descendants further breeding with sakers.

=== Subspecies ===
Numerous subspecies of Falco peregrinus have been described, with 18 accepted by the IOC World Bird List, and 19 accepted by the 1994 Handbook of the Birds of the World, which considers the Barbary falcon of the Canary Islands and coastal North Africa to be two subspecies (F. p. pelegrinoides and F. p. babylonicus) of Falco peregrinus, rather than a distinct species, F. pelegrinoides. The following map shows the general ranges of these 19 subspecies.

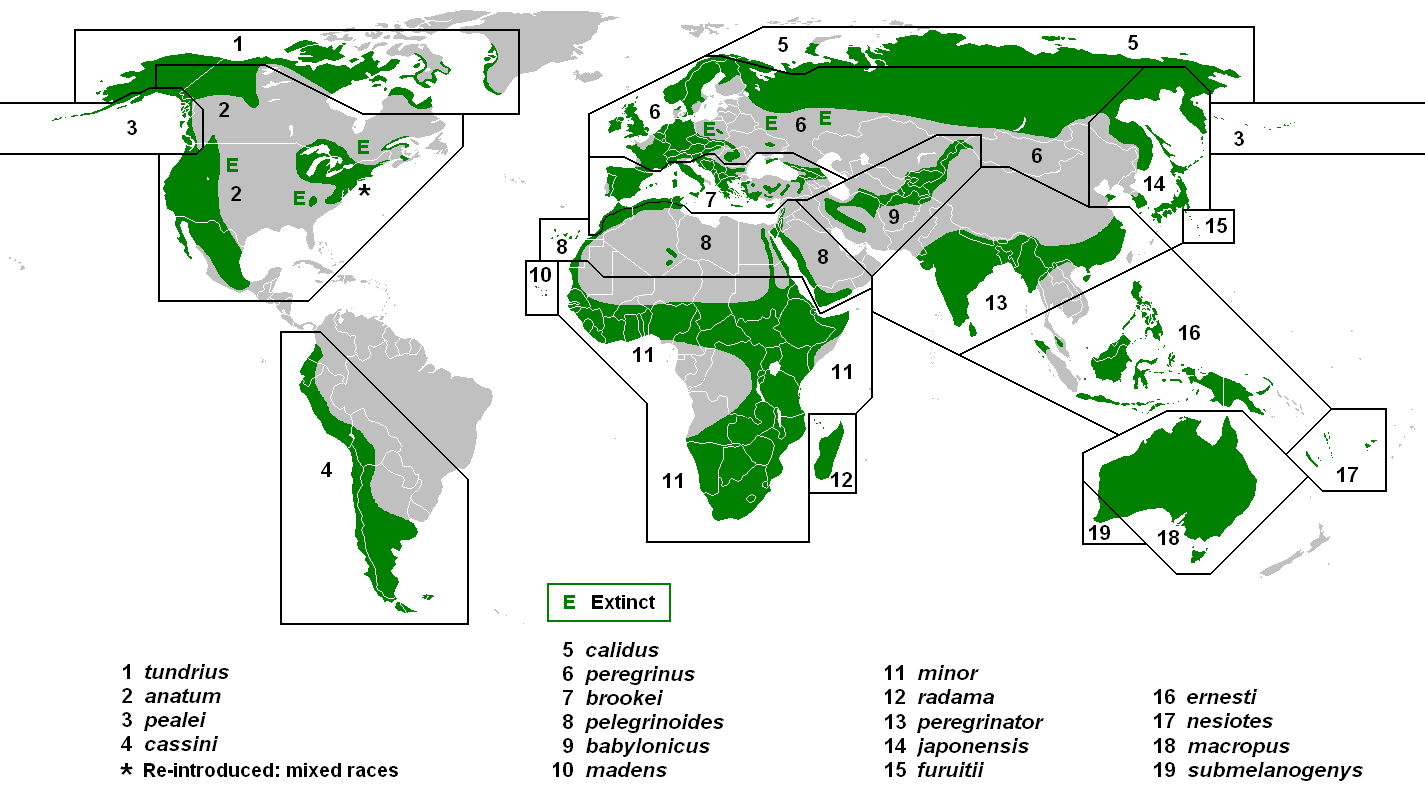
Breeding ranges of the 19 subspecies

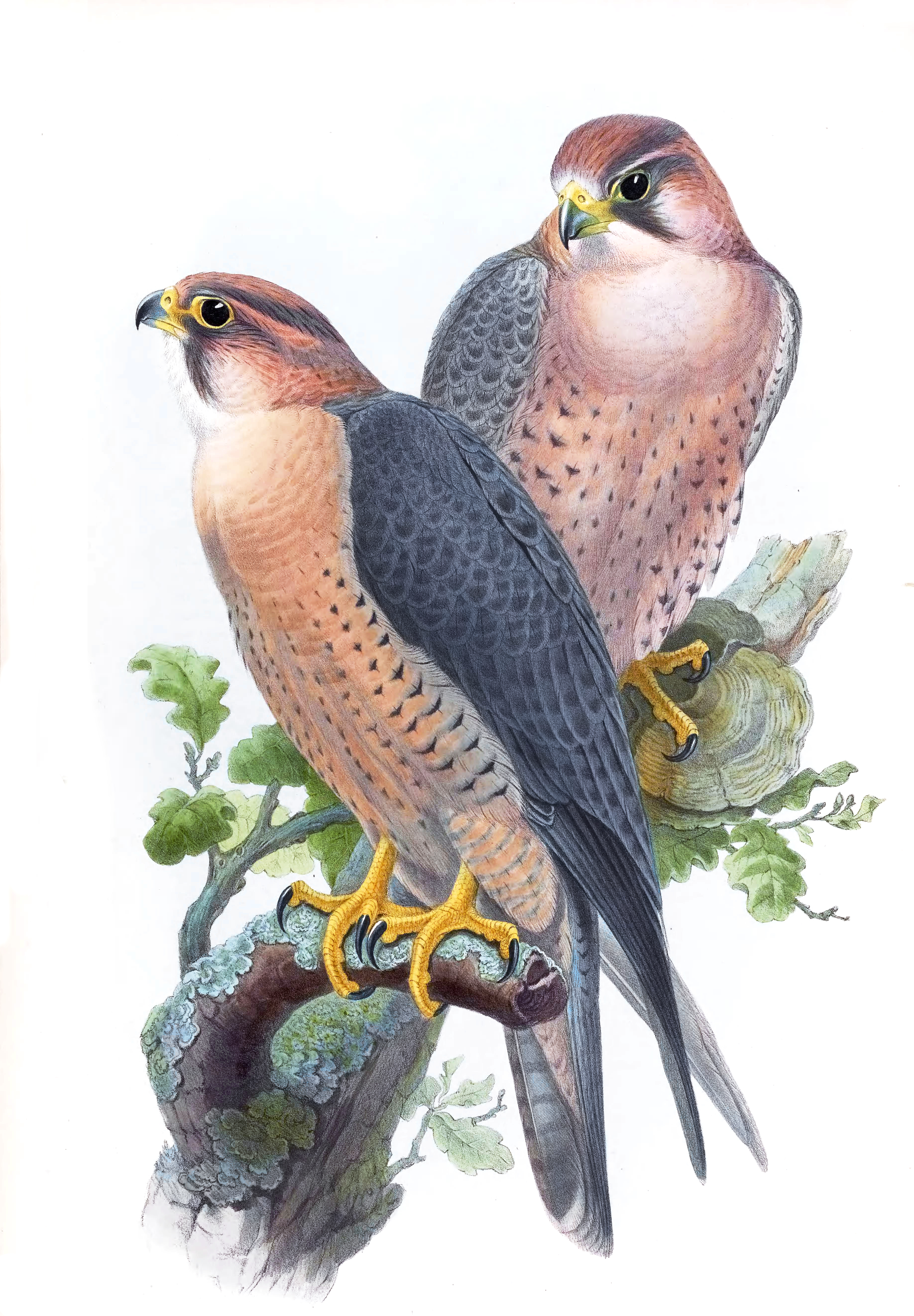
Illustration of the subspecies babylonicus by John Gould

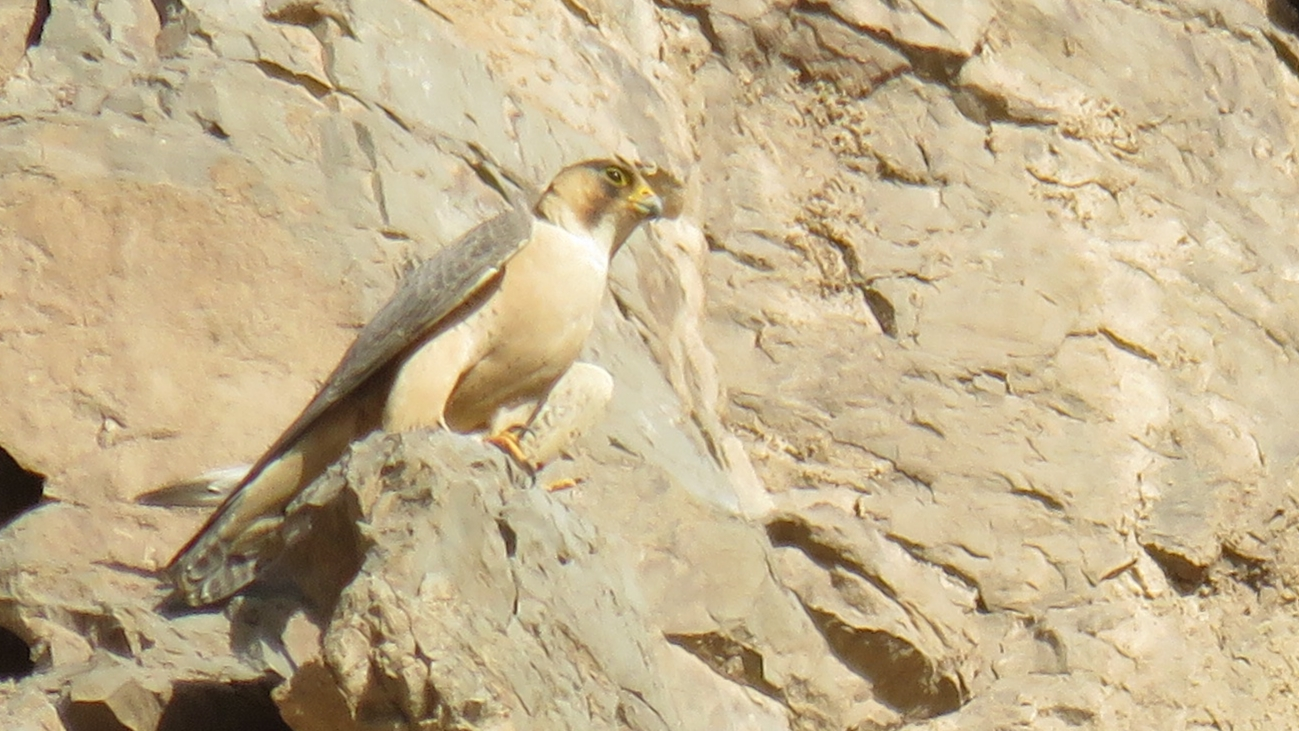
A male Red-naped shaheen by its nest in Kerman, Kerman province, Iran

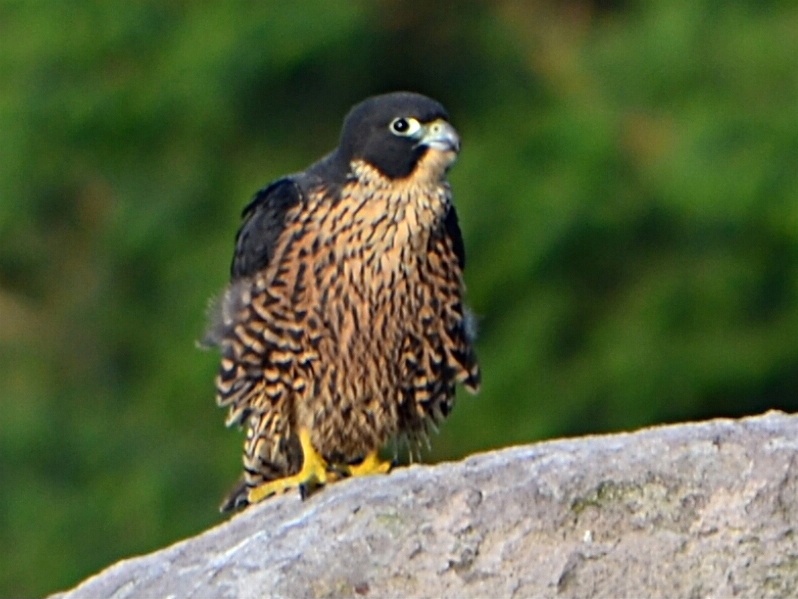
A juvenile of the subspecies ernesti in Mount Mahawu, North Sulawesi, Indonesia

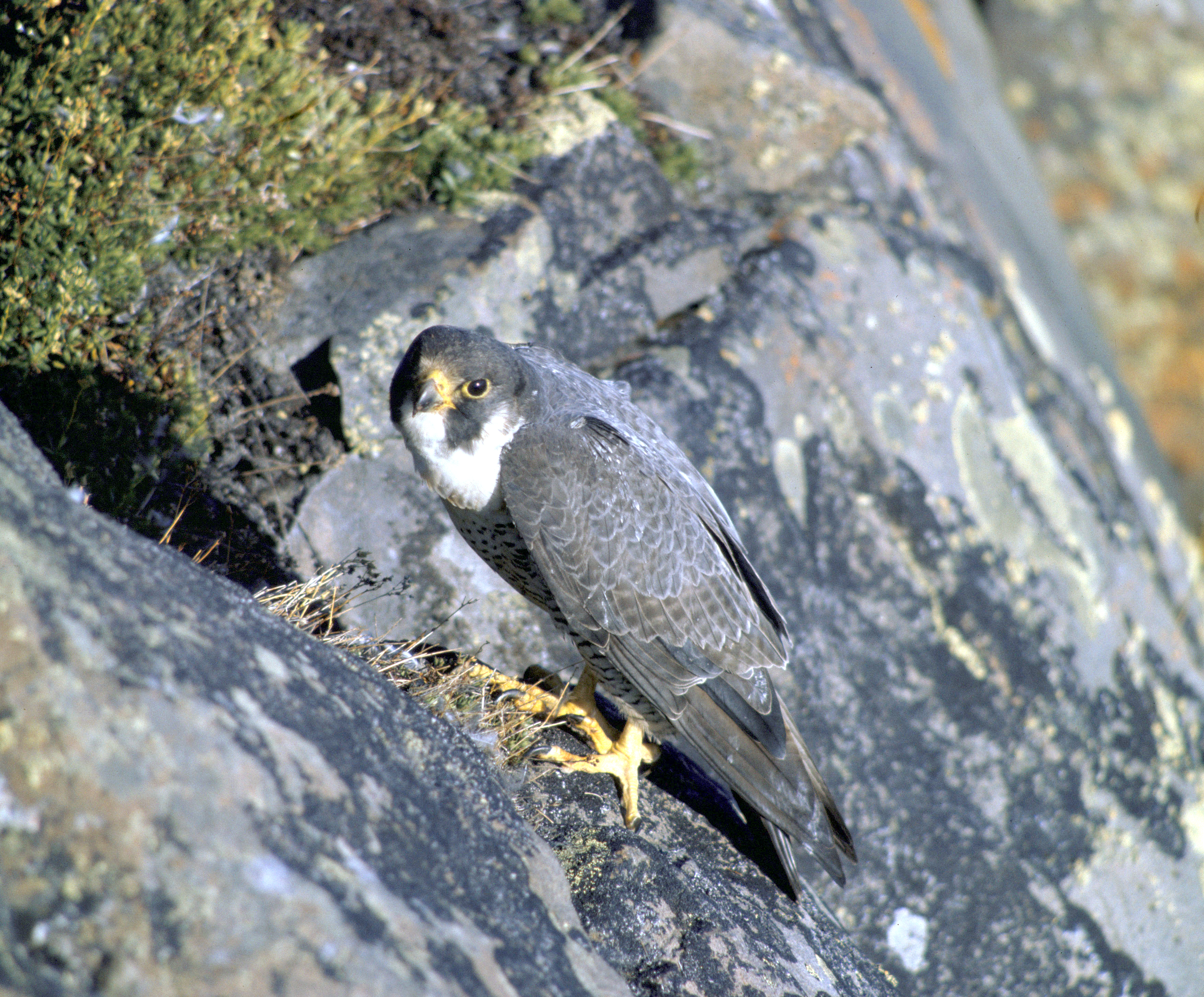
An adult of either the subspecies pealei or tundrius by its nest in Alaska

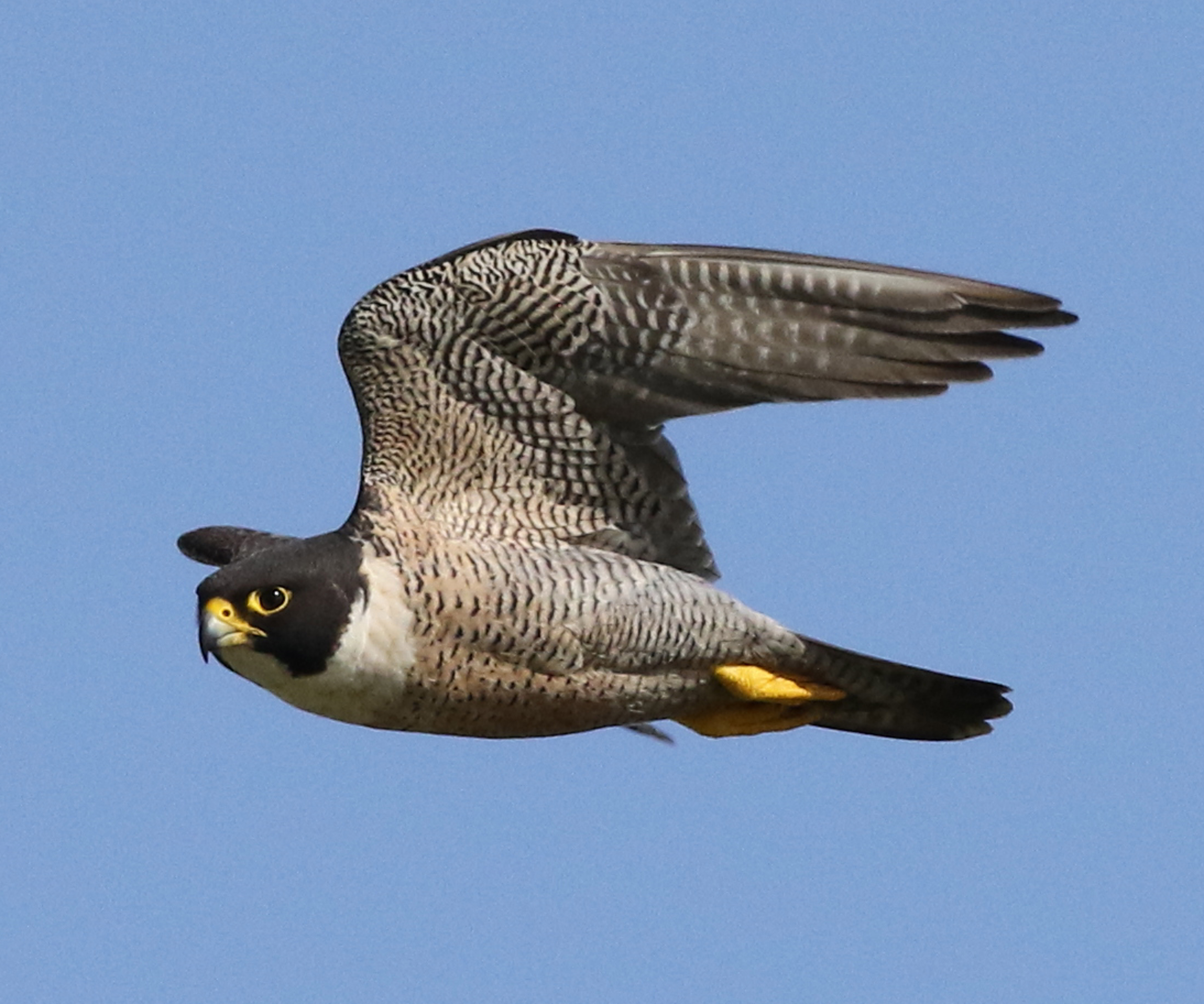
F. p. submelanogenys at Herdsman Lake, near Perth, Western Australia

- Falco peregrinus anatum, described by Bonaparte in 1838, is known as the American peregrine falcon or "duck hawk"; its scientific name means "duck peregrine falcon". At one time, it was partly included in F. p. leucogenys. It is mainly found in the Rocky Mountains. It was formerly common throughout North America between the tundra and North Mexico, where current reintroduction efforts are being made to restore the population. Most mature F. p. anatum, except those that breed in more northern areas, winter in their breeding range. Most vagrants that reach western Europe seem to belong to the more northern and strongly migratory F. p. tundrius, only considered distinct since 1968. It is similar to the nominate subspecies but is slightly smaller; adults are somewhat paler and less patterned below, but juveniles are darker and more patterned below. Males weigh 500 to 700 g (1.1–1.5 lb), while females weigh 800 to 1,100 g (1.8–2.4 lb). It became regionally extinct in eastern North America in the mid 20th century, and populations there now are hybrids as a result of reintroductions of birds from elsewhere.
- Falco peregrinus babylonicus, described by P.L. Sclater in 1861, is found in eastern Iran along the Hindu Kush and the Tian Shan to the Mongolian Altai ranges. A few birds winter in northern and northwestern India, mainly in dry semi-desert habitats. It is paler than F. p. pelegrinoides and similar to a small, pale lanner falcon (Falco biarmicus). Males weigh 330 to 400 grams (12 to 14 oz), while females weigh 513 to 765 grams (18.1 to 27.0 oz).
- Falco peregrinus brookei, described by Sharpe in 1873, is also known as the Mediterranean peregrine falcon or the Maltese falcon. (Note: Charles V, Holy Roman Emperor levied a nominal rent of these birds on the Knights Hospitallers when he donated the territories of Malta, Gozo and Tripoli to them. The source of the name for Dashiell Hammett's novel.) It includes F. p. caucasicus and most specimens of the proposed race F. p. punicus, though others may be F. p. pelegrinoides (Barbary falcons), or perhaps the rare hybrids between these two which might occur around Algeria. They occur from the Iberian Peninsula around the Mediterranean, except in arid regions, to the Caucasus. They are non-migratory. It is smaller than the nominate subspecies and the underside usually has a rusty hue. Males weigh around 445 g (0.981 lb), while females weigh up to 920 g (2.03 lb).
- Falco peregrinus calidus, described by John Latham in 1790, it was formerly called F. p. leucogenys and includes F. p. caeruleiceps. It breeds in the Arctic tundra of Eurasia from Murmansk Oblast to roughly Yana and Indigirka Rivers, Siberia. It is completely migratory and travels south in winter as far as South Asia and sub-Saharan Africa. It is often seen around wetland habitats. It is paler than the nominate subspecies, especially on the crown. Males weigh 588 to 740 g (1.296–1.631 lb), while females weigh 925 to 1,333 g (2.039–2.939 lb).
- Falco peregrinus cassini, described by Sharpe in 1873, is also known as the austral peregrine falcon. It includes F. p. kreyenborgi, the pallid falcon, (Note: Also called "Kleinschmidt's falcon", but this might equally refer to F. p. kleinschmidti, which is a junior synonym of F. p. japonensis.) a leucistic colour morph occurring in southernmost South America, which was long believed to be a distinct species. Its range includes South America from Ecuador, Argentina, and the Falklands. It is non-migratory. It is similar to the nominate subspecies, but slightly smaller with a black ear region. The pallid falcon morph F. p. kreyenborgi is medium grey above, has little barring below and has a head pattern like the saker falcon (Falco cherrug), but the ear region is white.
- Falco peregrinus ernesti, described by Sharpe in 1894, is found from the Sunda Islands to the Philippines and south to eastern New Guinea and the nearby Bismarck Archipelago. Its geographical separation from F. p. nesiotes requires confirmation. It is non-migratory. It differs from the nominate subspecies in the very dark, dense barring on its underside and its black ear coverts.
- Falco peregrinus furuitii, described by Momiyama in 1927, is found on the Izu and Ogasawara Islands south of Honshū, Japan. It is non-migratory. It is very rare and may only remain on a single island. It is a dark form, resembling F. p. pealei in colour, but darker, especially on the tail.
- Falco peregrinus japonensis, described by Gmelin in 1788, includes F. p. kleinschmidti, F. p. pleskei, and F. p. harterti, and seems to refer to intergrades with F. p. calidus. It is found from northeast Siberia to Kamchatka (though it is possibly replaced by F. p. pealei on the coast there) and Japan. Northern populations are migratory, while those of Japan are resident. It is similar to the nominate subspecies, but the young are even darker than those of F. p. anatum.
- Falco peregrinus macropus, described by Swainson in 1837, is the Australian peregrine falcon or "black-cheeked falcon". It is found in Australia in all regions except the southwest, where replaced by F. p. submelanogenys; some authorities treat the latter as a synonym of F. p. macropus. It is non-migratory. It is similar to F. p. brookei in appearance, but is slightly smaller and the ear region is entirely black. The feet are proportionally large.
- Falco peregrinus madens, described by Ripley and Watson in 1963, is unusual in having some sexual dichromatism. If the Barbary falcon (see below) is considered a distinct species, it is sometimes placed therein. It is found in the Cape Verde Islands and is non-migratory; it is also endangered, with only six to eight pairs surviving. Males have a rufous wash on the crown, nape, ears and back; the underside is conspicuously washed pinkish-brown. Females are tinged rich brown overall, especially on the crown and nape.

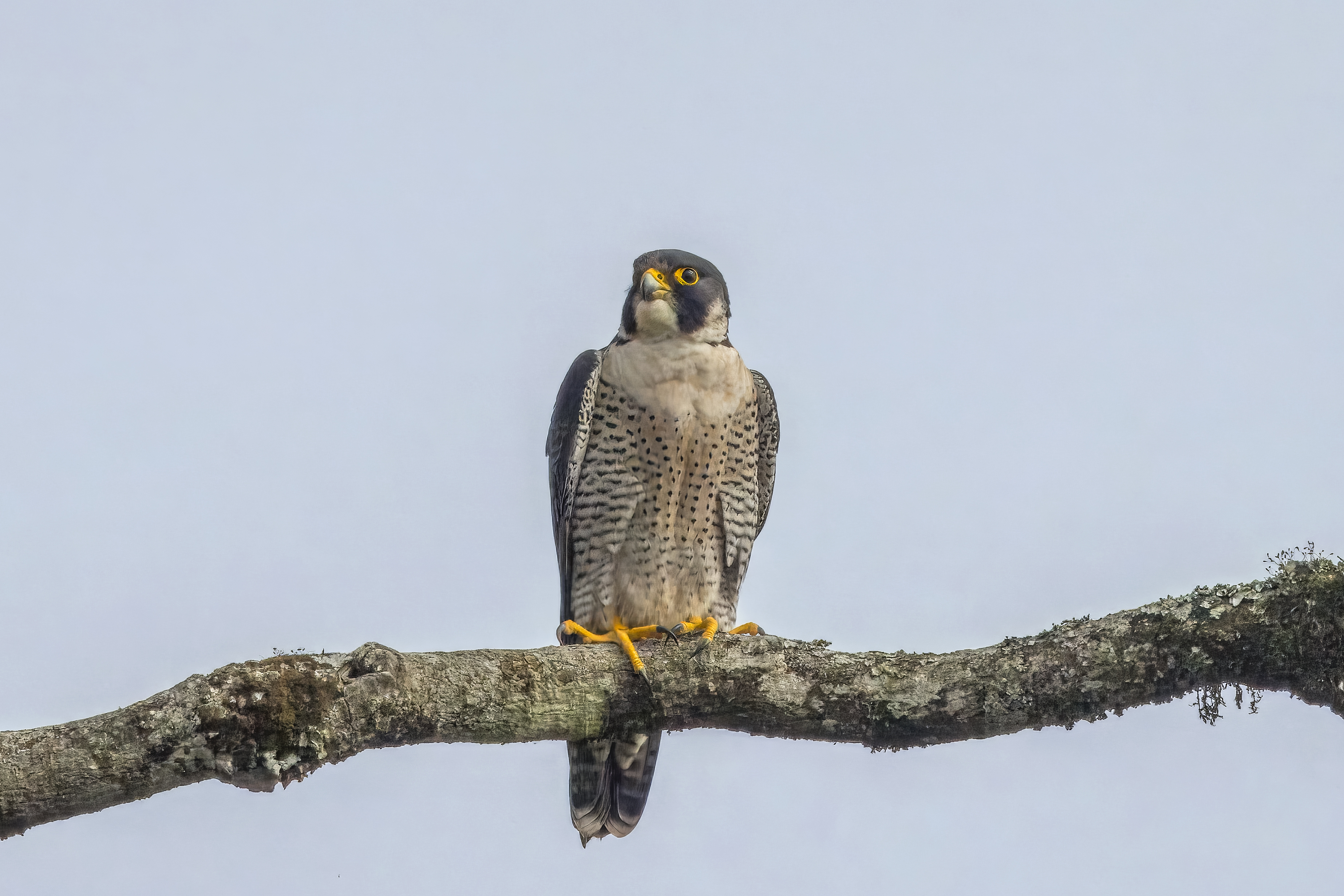
F. p. minor in Tanzania

- Falco peregrinus minor, first described by Bonaparte in 1850. It was formerly often known as F. p. perconfusus. It is sparsely and patchily distributed throughout much of sub-Saharan Africa and widespread in Southern Africa. It apparently reaches north along the Atlantic coast as far as Morocco. It is non-migratory and dark-coloured. This is the smallest subspecies, with smaller males weighing as little as approximately 300 g (11 oz).
- Falco peregrinus nesiotes, described by Mayr in 1941, is found in Fiji and probably also Vanuatu and New Caledonia. It is non-migratory.
- Falco peregrinus pealei, described by Ridgway in 1873, is Peale's falcon and includes F. p. rudolfi. It is found in the Pacific Northwest of North America, northwards from Puget Sound along the British Columbia coast (including the Haida Gwaii), along the Gulf of Alaska and the Aleutian Islands to the far eastern Bering Sea coast, and may also occur on the Kuril Islands and the coasts of Kamchatka. It is non-migratory. It is the largest subspecies and it looks like an oversized and darker tundrius or like a strongly barred and large F. p. anatum. The bill is very wide. Juveniles occasionally have pale crowns. Males weigh 700 to 1,000 g (1.5–2.2 lb), while females weigh 1,000 to 1,500 g (2.2–3.3 lb).
- Falco peregrinus pelegrinoides, first described by Temminck in 1829, is found in the Canary Islands through North Africa and the Near East to Mesopotamia. It is most similar to F. p. brookei, but is markedly paler above, with a rusty neck, and is a light buff with reduced barring below. It is smaller than the nominate subspecies; females weigh around 610 g (1.34 lb).
- Falco peregrinus peregrinator, described by Sundevall in 1837, is known as the Indian peregrine falcon, black shaheen, Indian shaheen (Note: The shaheen (شاهین) of Arabic and Persian writers are usually Barbary falcons; those in Indian (शाहीन) and Pakistani (شاہین) sources normally refer to F. p. peregrinator.) or shaheen falcon. It was formerly sometimes known as Falco atriceps or Falco shaheen. Its range includes South Asia from across the Indian subcontinent to Tibet. In India, the shaheen falcon is reported from all states except Uttar Pradesh, mainly from rocky and hilly regions. The shaheen falcon is also reported from the Andaman and Nicobar Islands in the Bay of Bengal. It has a clutch size of 3 to 4 eggs, with the chicks fledging time of 48 days with an average nesting success of 1.32 chicks per nest. In India, apart from nesting on cliffs, it has also been recorded as nesting on man-made structures such as buildings and cellphone transmission towers. A population estimate of 40 breeding pairs in Sri Lanka was made in 1996. It is non-migratory and is small and dark, with rufous underparts. In Sri Lanka this species is found to favour the higher hills, while the migrant calidus is more often seen along the coast.
- Falco peregrinus peregrinus, the nominate (first-named) subspecies, described by Tunstall in 1771, breeds over much of temperate Eurasia between the tundra in the north and the Pyrenees, Mediterranean region and Alpide belt in the south. It is mainly non-migratory in Europe, but migratory in Scandinavia and Asia. Males weigh 580 to 750 g (1.28–1.65 lb), while females weigh 925 to 1,300 g (2.039–2.866 lb). It includes F. p. brevirostris, F. p. germanicus, F. p. rhenanus and F. p. riphaeus.
- Falco peregrinus radama, described by Hartlaub in 1861, is found in Madagascar and the Comoros. It is non-migratory.
- Falco peregrinus submelanogenys, described by Mathews in 1912, is the Southwest Australian peregrine falcon. It is found in southwestern Australia and is non-migratory. Some authorities consider it a synonym of the widespread Australian subspecies F. p. macropus.
- Falco peregrinus tundrius, described by C. M. White in 1968, was at one time included in F. p. leucogenys. It is found in the Arctic tundra of North America to Greenland, and migrates to wintering grounds in Central and South America. Most vagrants that reach western Europe belong to this subspecies, which was previously considered synonymous with F. p. anatum. It is the New World equivalent to F. p. calidus. It is smaller and paler than F. p. anatum; most have a conspicuous white forehead and white in ear region, but the crown and "moustache" are very dark, unlike in F. p. calidus. Juveniles are browner and less grey than in F. p. calidus and paler, sometimes almost sandy, than in F. p. anatum. Males weigh 500 to 700 g (1.1–1.5 lb), while females weigh 800 to 1,100 g (1.8–2.4 lb). Despite its current recognition as a valid subspecies, a population genetic study of both pre-decline (i.e., museum) and recovered contemporary populations failed to distinguish F. p. anatum and F. p. tundrius genetically.

=== Barbary falcon ===
The Barbary falcon is a subspecies of the peregrine falcon that inhabits parts of North Africa, from the Canary Islands to the Arabian Peninsula. There was discussion concerning the taxonomic status of the bird, with some considering it a subspecies of the peregrine falcon and others considering it a full species with two subspecies.

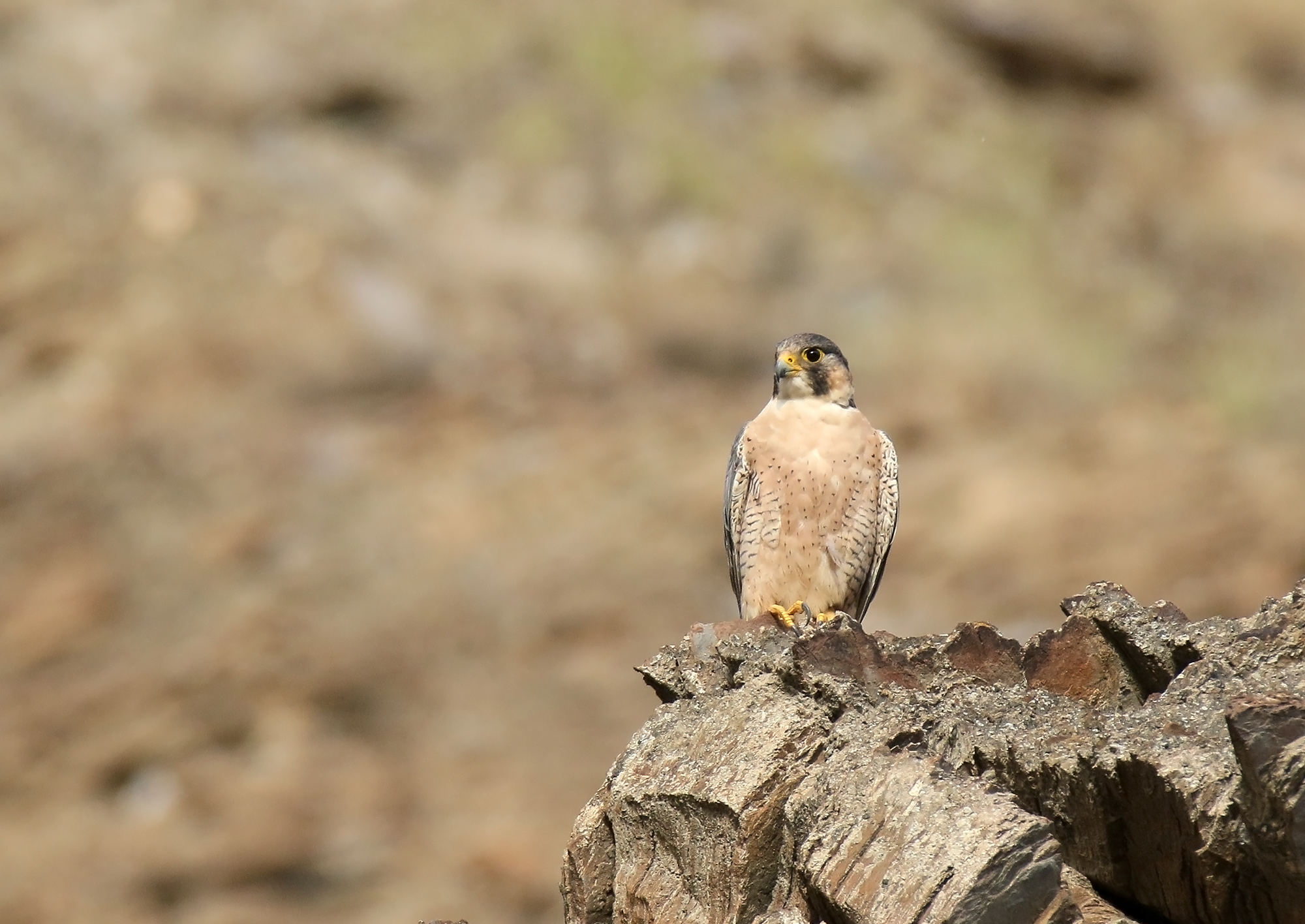
A Barbary Falcon (Falco pelegrinoides) perched on a rock

Compared to the other peregrine falcon subspecies, Barbary falcons have a slimmer body and a distinct plumage pattern. Despite numbers and range of these birds throughout the Canary Islands generally increasing, they are considered endangered, with human interference through falconry and shooting threatening their well-being. Falconry can further complicate the speciation and genetics of these Canary Islands falcons, as the practice promotes genetic mixing between individuals from outside the islands with those originating from the islands. Population density of the Barbary falcons on Tenerife, the biggest of the seven major Canary Islands, was found to be 1.27 pairs/100 km^{2}, with the mean distance between pairs being 5869 ± 3338 m. The falcons were only observed near large and natural cliffs with a mean altitude of 697.6 m. Falcons show an affinity for tall cliffs away from human-mediated establishments and presence.

Barbary falcons have a red neck patch, but otherwise differ in appearance from the peregrine falcon proper merely according to Gloger's rule, relating pigmentation to environmental humidity. The Barbary falcon has a peculiar way of flying, beating only the outer part of its wings as fulmars sometimes do; this also occurs in the peregrine falcon, but less often and far less pronounced. The Barbary falcon's shoulder and pelvis bones are stout by comparison with the peregrine falcon and its feet are smaller. Barbary falcons breed at different times of year than neighboring peregrine falcon subspecies, but they are capable of interbreeding. There is a 0.6–0.7% genetic distance in the peregrine falcon-Barbary falcon ("peregrinoid") complex.

== Ecology and behavior ==
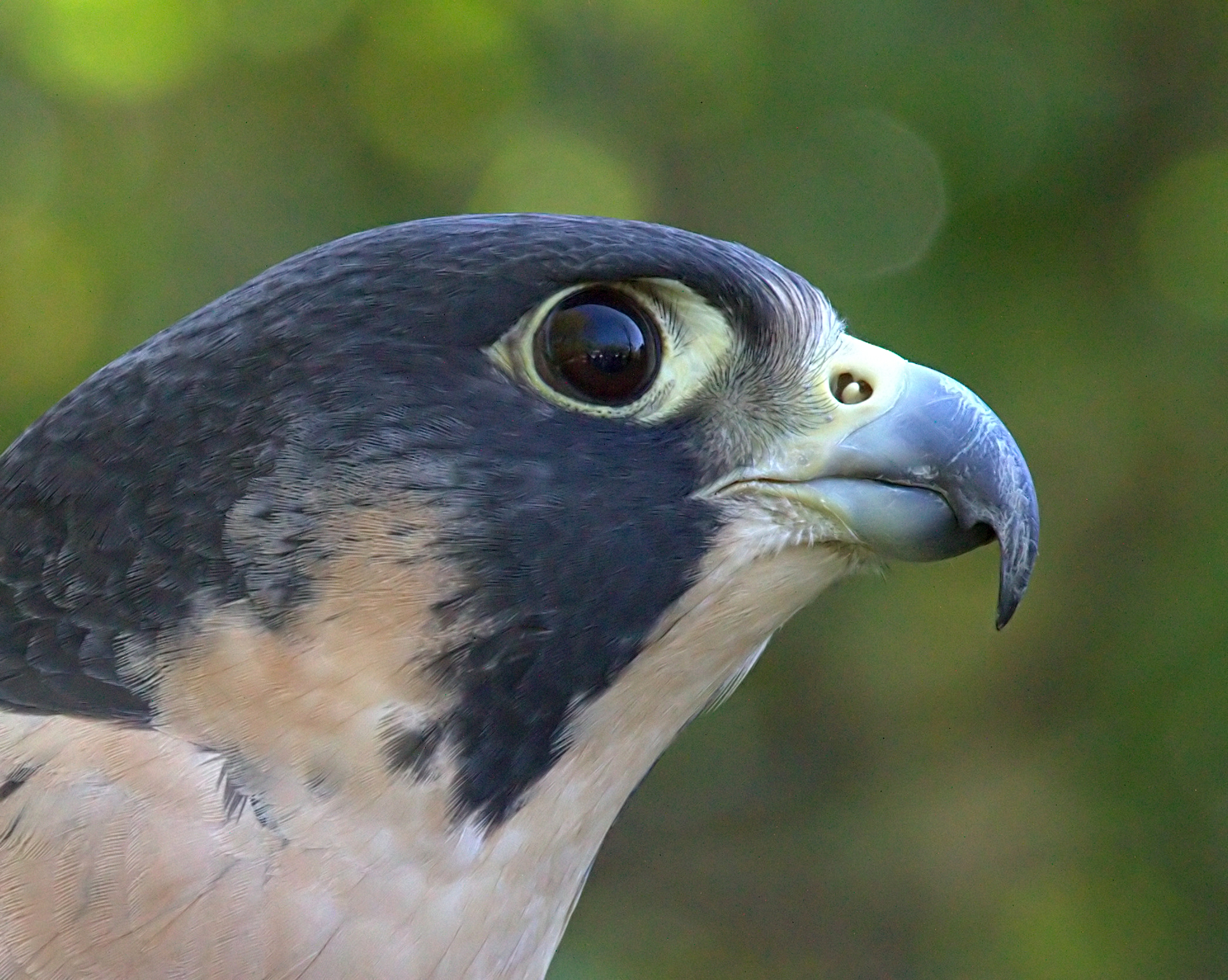
Closeup of head showing nostril tubercle

Silhouette in normal flight (left) and at the start of a stoop (right)

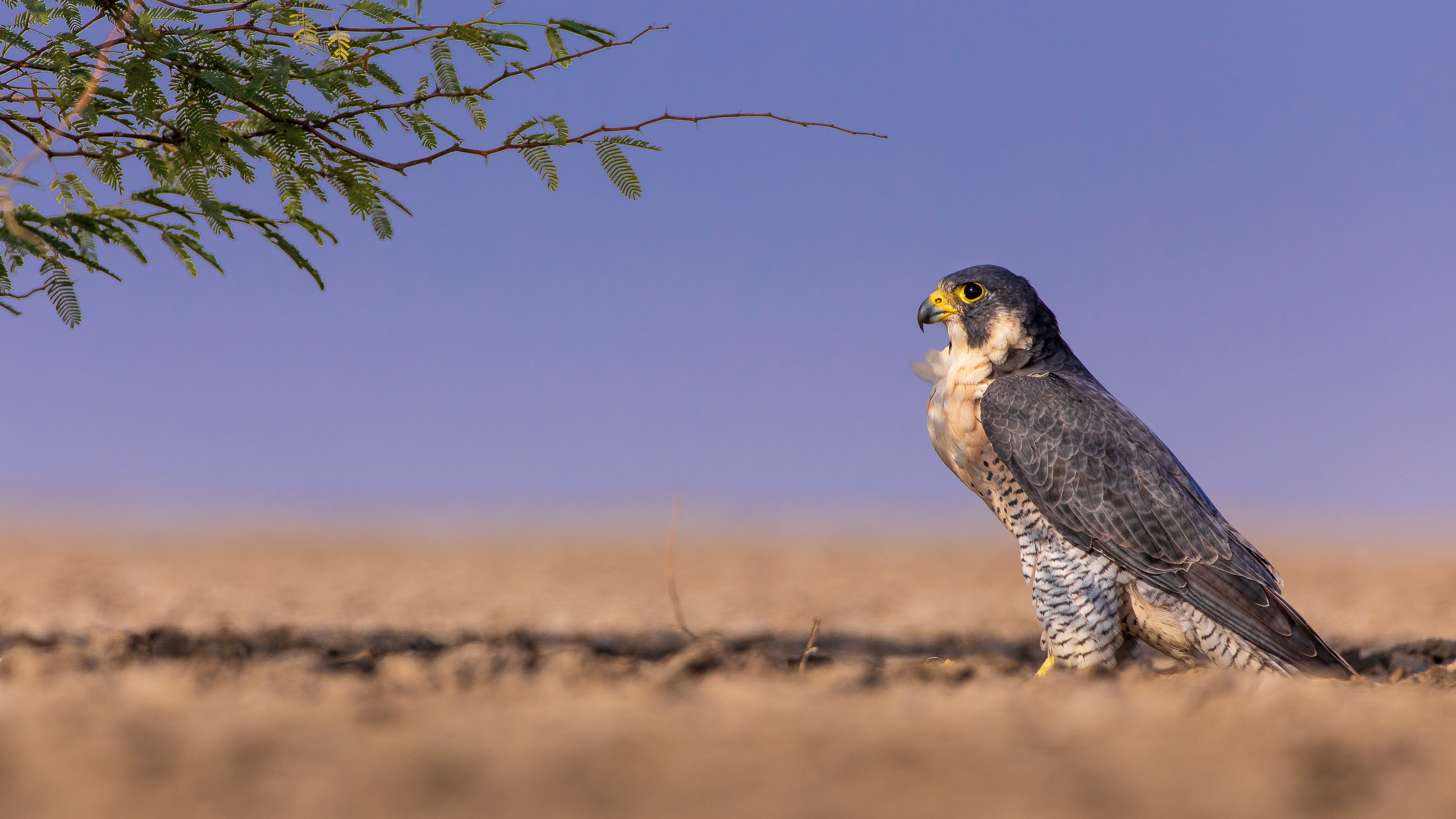
In its habitat in the Rann of Kutch, Gujarat, India

The peregrine falcon lives mostly along mountain ranges, river valleys, coastlines, and increasingly in cities. In mild-winter regions, it is usually a permanent resident, and some individuals, especially adult males, will remain on the breeding territory. Only populations that breed in Arctic climates typically migrate great distances during the northern winter.

The peregrine falcon's characteristic hunting stoop (high-speed dive) involves soaring to a great height and then diving steeply at very high speeds, hitting one wing of its prey so as not to harm itself on impact. The air pressure from such a dive could possibly damage a bird's lungs, but small bony tubercles on a falcon's nostrils are theorized to guide the powerful airflow away from the nostrils, enabling the bird to breathe more easily while diving by reducing the change in air pressure.

To protect their eyes, the falcons use their nictitating membranes (third eyelids) to spread tears and clear debris from their eyes while maintaining vision.

Peregrine falcons have a flicker fusion frequency of 129 Hz (cycles per second), very fast for a bird of its size, and much faster than mammals.

The life span of peregrine falcons in the wild is up to 19 years 9 months. Mortality in the first year is 59–70%, declining to 25–32% annually in adults. Apart from such anthropogenic threats as collision with human-made objects, the peregrine may be killed by larger hawks and owls.

The peregrine falcon is host to a range of parasites and pathogens. It is a vector for Avipoxvirus, Newcastle disease virus, Falconid herpesvirus 1 (and possibly other Herpesviridae), and some mycoses and bacterial infections. Endoparasites include Plasmodium relictum (usually not causing malaria in the peregrine falcon), Strigeidae trematodes, Serratospiculum amaculata (nematode), and tapeworms. Known peregrine falcon ectoparasites are chewing lice, (Note: Colpocephalum falconii which was described from specimens found on the peregrine falcon, Colpocephalum subzerafae, Colpocephalum zerafae and Nosopon lucidum (all Menoponidae), Degeeriella rufa (Philopteridae), Laemobothrion tinnunculi (Laemobothriidae). All are known from other Falco species too.) Ceratophyllus garei (a flea), and Hippoboscidae flies (Icosta nigra, Ornithoctona erythrocephala).

=== Speed ===
A study testing the flight physics of an "ideal falcon" found a theoretical speed limit at 400 km/h (250 mph) for low-altitude flight and 625 km/h (388 mph) for high-altitude flight. Some sources state that the peregrine falcon can reach over 320 km/h (200 mph) during its stoop, which would make it the fastest animal on the planet. According to a National Geographic TV program, in 2005 Ken Franklin recorded a falcon stooping at a top speed of 389 km/h (242 mph). Other sources state that radar tracks have never confirmed these kinds of speeds, with the highest reliably measured being 184 km/h (114 mph).

=== Feeding ===
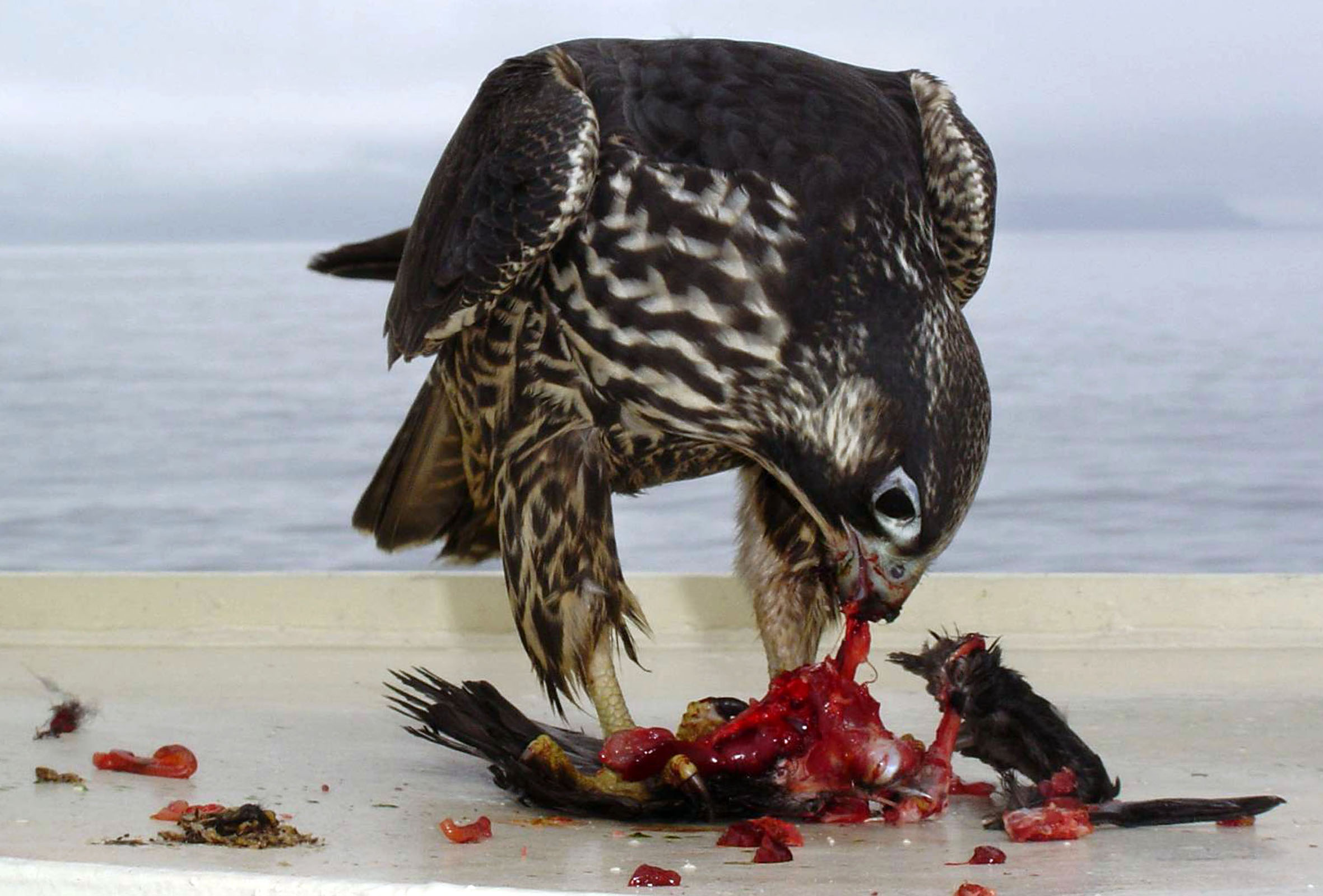
An immature peregrine falcon eating its prey on the deck of a ship

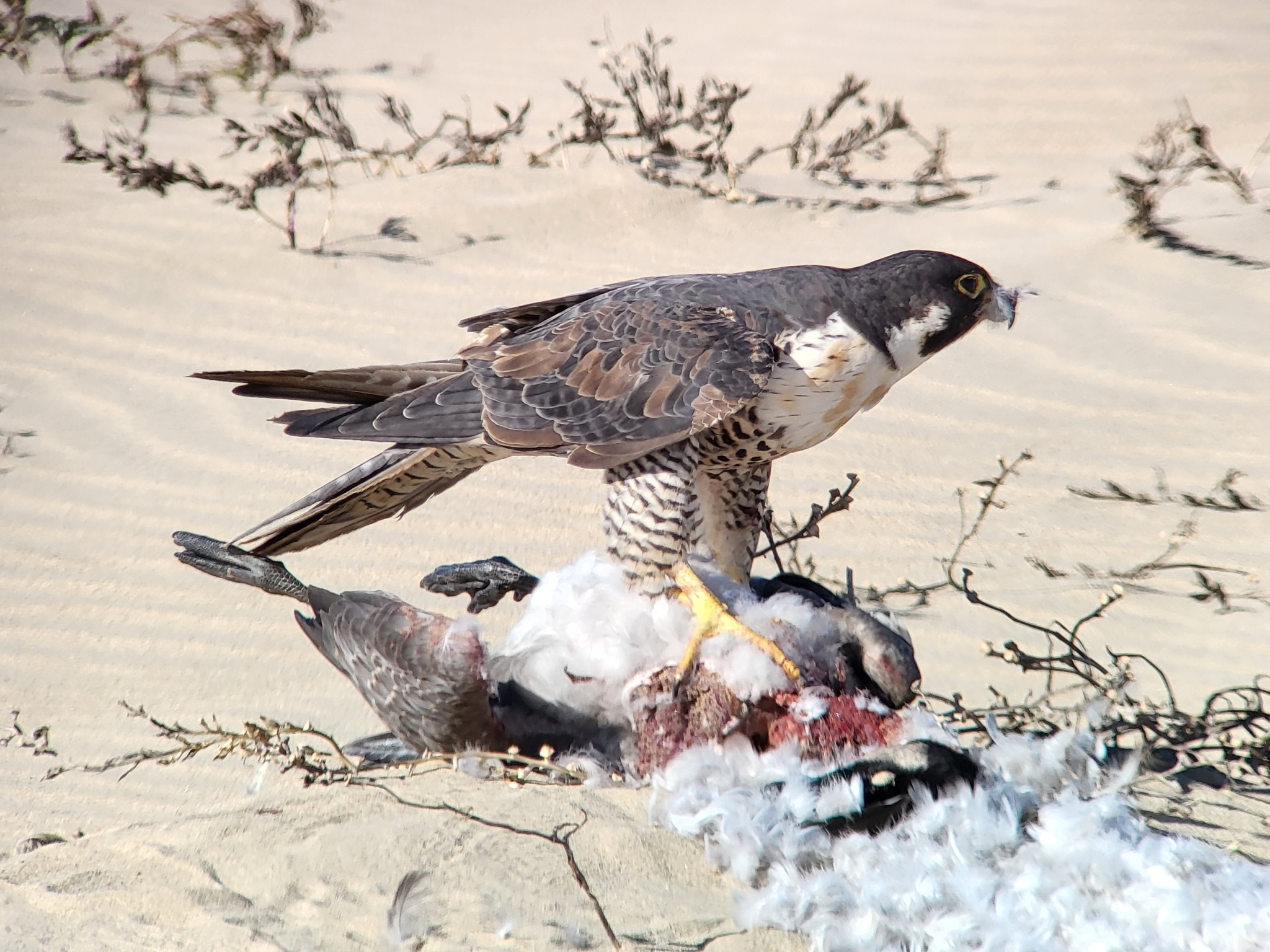
An adult peregrine feeding on a cackling goose, in California

The peregrine falcon's diet varies greatly and is adapted to available prey in different regions. However, it typically feeds on medium-sized birds such as pigeons and doves, waterfowl, gamebirds, songbirds, parrots, seabirds, and waders. Worldwide, it is estimated that between 1,500 and 2,000 bird species, or roughly a fifth of the world's bird species, are predated somewhere by these falcons. The peregrine falcon preys on the most diverse range of bird species of any raptor in North America, with over 300 species and including nearly 100 shorebirds. Its prey can range from 3 g (0.11 oz) hummingbirds (Selasphorus and Archilochus ssp.) to the 3.1 kg (6.8 lb) sandhill crane, although most prey taken by peregrines weigh between 20 g (0.71 oz) (small passerines) and 1,100 g (2.4 lb) (ducks, geese, loons, rails, gulls, capercaillies, ptarmigans and other grouse). Smaller hawks (such as sharp-shinned hawks) and owls are regularly predated, as well as smaller falcons such as the American kestrel, merlin and, rarely, other peregrines.

In urban areas, where it tends to nest on tall buildings or bridges, it subsists mostly on a variety of pigeons. Among pigeons, the rock dove or feral pigeon comprises 80% or more of the dietary intake of peregrines. Other common city birds are also taken regularly, including mourning doves, common wood pigeons, common swifts, northern flickers, Eurasian collared doves, common starlings, American robins, common blackbirds, and corvids such as magpies, jays or crows. Coastal populations of the large subspecies pealei feed almost exclusively on seabirds. In the Brazilian mangrove swamp of Cubatão, a wintering falcon of the subspecies tundrius was observed successfully hunting a juvenile scarlet ibis.

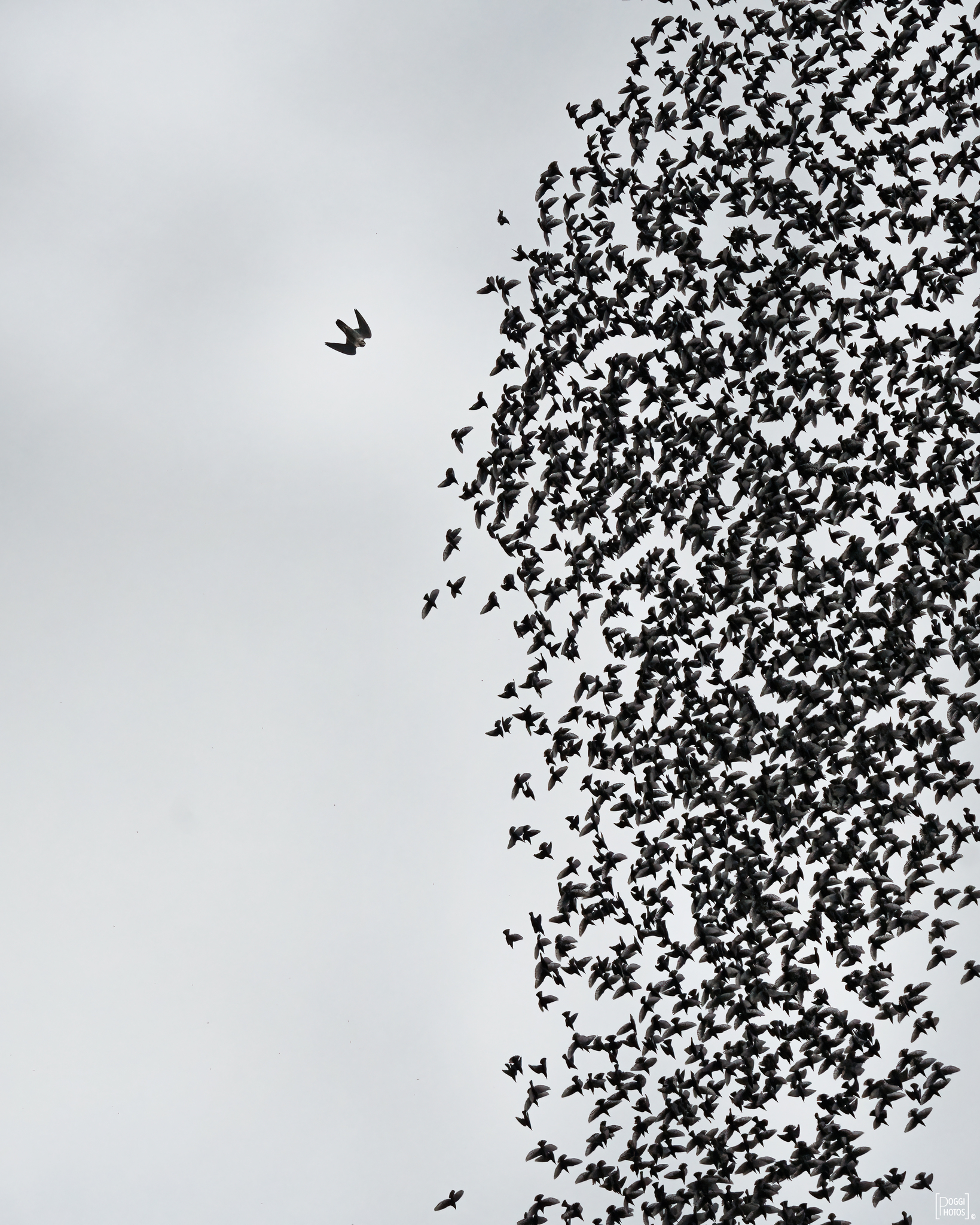
Diving on a flock of common starling in Rome

Among mammalian prey species, bats in the genera Eptesicus, Myotis, Pipistrellus and Tadarida are the most common prey taken at night. Though peregrines generally do not prefer terrestrial mammalian prey, in Rankin Inlet, peregrines largely take northern collared lemmings (Dicrostonyx groenlandicus) along with a few Arctic ground squirrels (Urocitellus parryii). Other small mammals including shrews, mice, rats, voles, and squirrels are more seldom taken. Peregrines occasionally take rabbits, mainly young individuals and juvenile hares. Additionally, remains of red fox kits and adult female American marten were found among prey remains. Insects, amphibians, and reptiles such as small snakes and lizards make up a small proportion of the diet, and salmonid fish have been taken by peregrines.

The peregrine falcon hunts most often at dawn and dusk, when prey are most active, but also nocturnally in cities, particularly during migration periods when hunting at night may become prevalent. Nocturnal migrants taken by peregrines include species as diverse as yellow-billed cuckoo, black-necked grebe, Virginia rail, and common quail. The peregrine requires open space in order to hunt, and therefore often hunts over open water, marshes, valleys, fields, and tundra, searching for prey either from a high perch or from the air. Large congregations of migrants, especially species that gather in the open like shorebirds, can be quite attractive to a hunting peregrine. Once prey is spotted, it begins its stoop, folding back the tail and wings, with feet tucked. Prey is typically struck and captured in mid-air; the peregrine falcon strikes its prey with a clenched foot, stunning or killing it with the impact, then turns to catch it in mid-air. If its prey is too heavy to carry, a peregrine will drop it to the ground and eat it there. If they miss the initial strike, peregrines will chase their prey in a twisting flight.

Although previously thought rare, several cases of peregrines contour-hunting, i.e., using natural contours to surprise and ambush prey on the ground, have been reported and even rare cases of prey being pursued on foot. In addition, peregrines have been documented preying on chicks in nests, from birds such as kittiwakes. Prey is plucked before consumption. A 2016 study showed that the presence of peregrines benefits non-preferred species while at the same time causing a decline in its preferred prey. As of 2018, the fastest recorded falcon was at 242 mph (nearly 390 km/h). Researchers at the University of Groningen in the Netherlands and at Oxford University used 3D computer simulations in 2018 to show that the high speed allows peregrines to gain better maneuverability and precision in strikes.

=== Reproduction ===
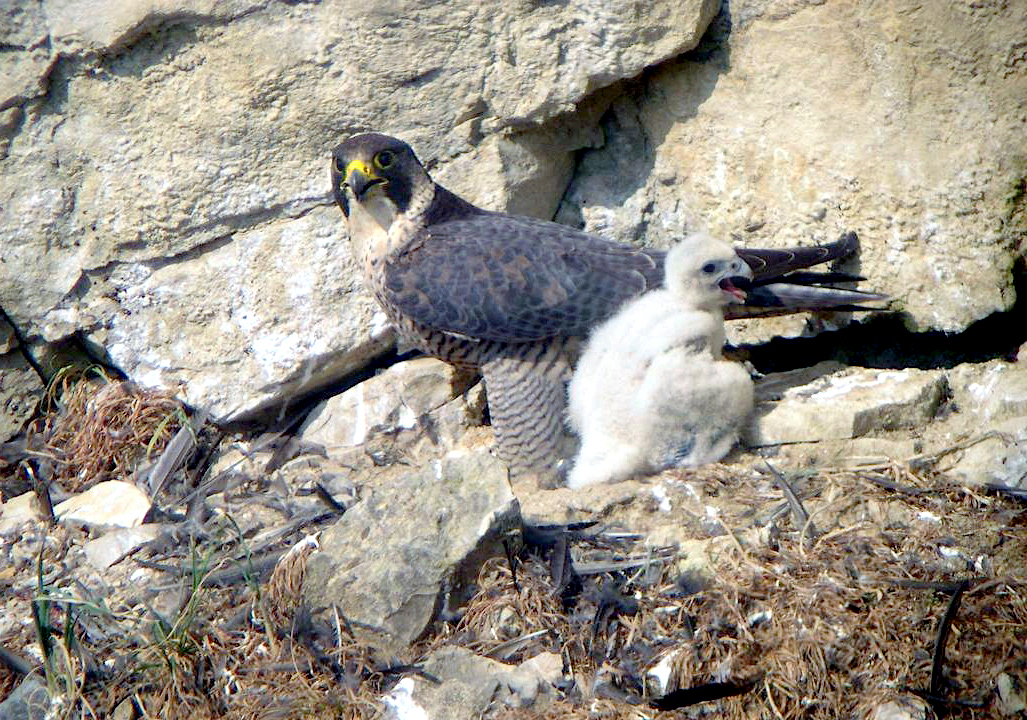
At nest, France

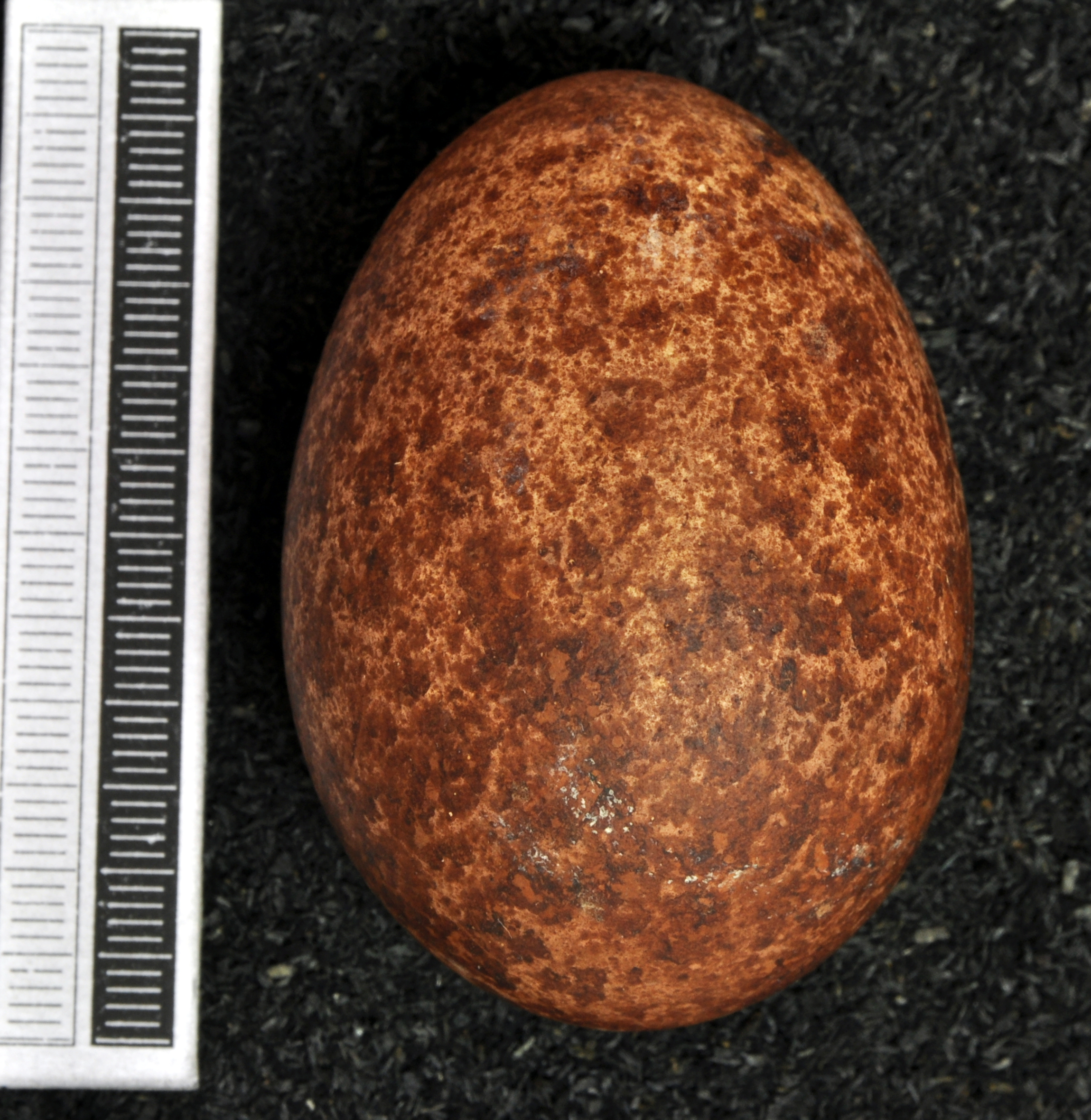
Egg, Museum Wiesbaden

The peregrine falcon is sexually mature at one to three years of age, but in larger populations they breed after two to three years of age. A pair mates for life and returns to the same nesting spot annually. The courtship flight includes a mix of aerial acrobatics, precise spirals, and steep dives. The male passes prey it has caught to the female in mid-air. To make this possible, the female flies upside-down to receive the food from the male's talons. During the breeding season, the peregrine falcon is territorial; nesting pairs are usually more than 1 km (0.62 mi) apart, and often much farther, even in areas with large numbers of pairs. The distance between nests ensures sufficient food supply for pairs and their chicks. Within a breeding territory, a pair may have several nesting ledges; the number used by a pair can vary from one or two up to seven in a 16-year period.

The peregrine falcon nests in a scrape, normally on cliff edges. The female chooses a nest site, where she scrapes a shallow hollow in the loose soil, sand, gravel, or dead vegetation in which to lay eggs. No nest materials are added. Cliff nests are generally located under an overhang, on ledges with vegetation. South-facing sites are favoured. In some regions, as in parts of Australia and on the west coast of northern North America, large tree hollows are used for nesting. Before the demise of most European peregrines, a large population of peregrines in central and western Europe used the disused nests of other large birds. In remote, undisturbed areas such as the Arctic, steep slopes and even low rocks and mounds may be used as nest sites. In many parts of its range, peregrines now also nest regularly on tall buildings or bridges; these human-made structures used for breeding closely resemble the natural cliff ledges that the peregrine prefers for its nesting locations.

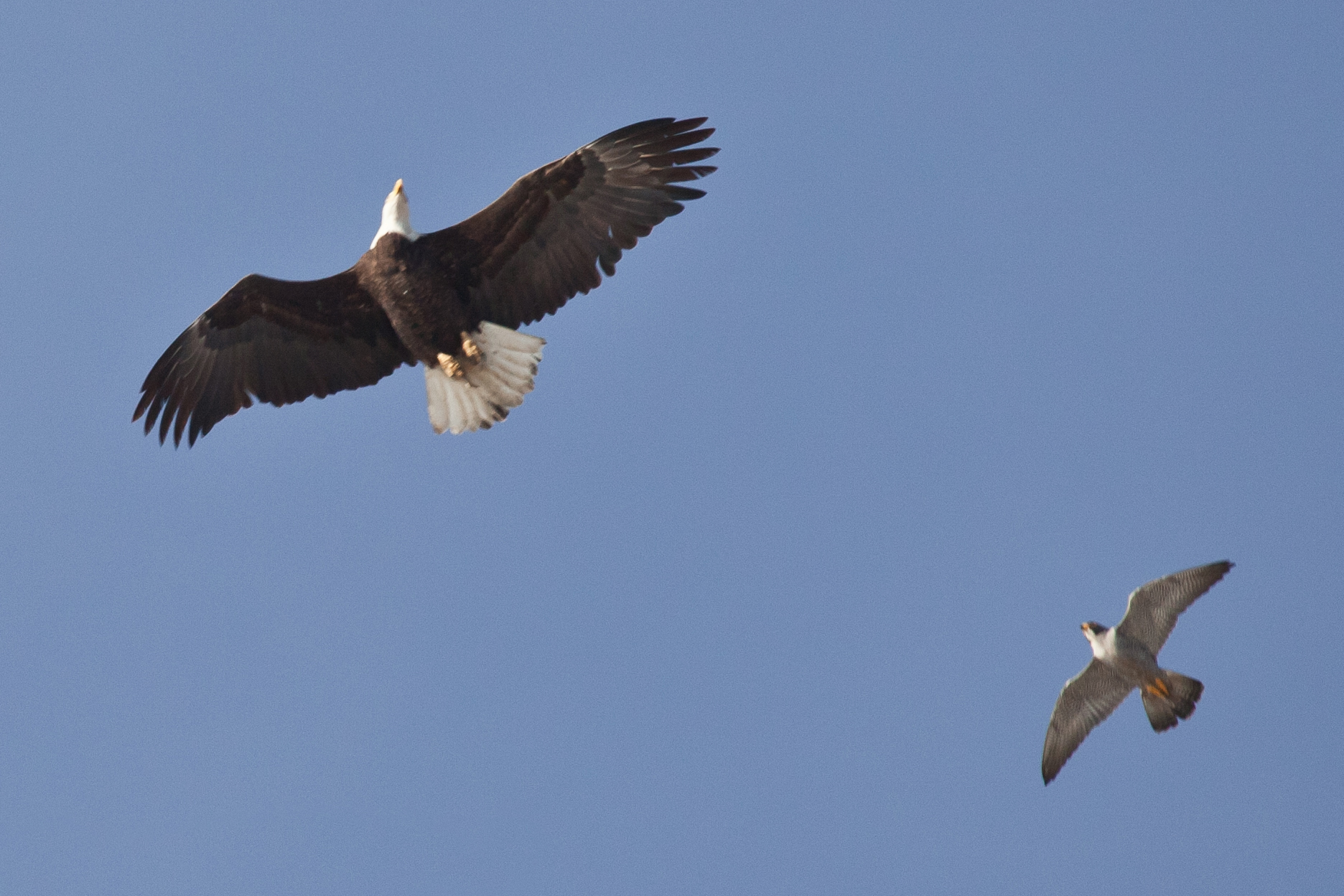
Chasing a bald eagle away from its nesting area, in California

The pair defends the chosen nest site against other peregrines, and often against ravens and eagles. Both nests and (less frequently) adults are predated by larger-bodied raptorial birds like eagles, large owls, or gyrfalcons. The most serious predators of peregrine nests in North America and Europe are the great horned owl and the Eurasian eagle-owl. When reintroductions have been attempted for peregrines, the most serious impediments were these two species of owls routinely picking off nestlings, fledglings and adults by night. Peregrines defending their nests have managed to kill raptors as large as golden eagles and bald eagles (both of which they normally avoid as potential predators) that have come too close to the nest by ambushing them in a full stoop. In one instance, when a snowy owl killed a newly fledged peregrine, the larger owl was in turn killed by a stooping peregrine parent.

In Florida, peregrine falcons could potentially be eaten at some growth stage of invasive snakes such as Burmese pythons, reticulated pythons, Southern African rock pythons, Central African rock pythons, boa constrictors, yellow anacondas, Bolivian anacondas, dark-spotted anacondas, and green anacondas.

The date of egg-laying varies according to locality, but is generally from February to March in the Northern Hemisphere, and from July to August in the Southern Hemisphere, although the Australian subspecies F. p. macropus may breed as late as November, and equatorial populations may nest anytime between June and December. If the eggs are lost early in the nesting season, the female usually lays another clutch, although this is extremely rare in the Arctic due to the short summer season. Generally three to four eggs, but sometimes as few as one or as many as five, are laid in the scrape. The eggs are white to buff with red or brown markings. They are incubated for 29 to 33 days, mainly by the female, with the male also helping with the incubation of the eggs during the day, but only the female incubating them at night. The average number of young found in nests is 2.5, and the average number that fledge is about 1.5, due to the occasional production of infertile eggs and various natural losses of nestlings.

After hatching, the chicks (called "eyases") are covered with creamy-white down and have disproportionately large feet. The male (called the "tiercel") and the female (simply called the "falcon") both leave the nest to gather prey to feed the young. The hunting territory of the parents can extend a radius of 19 to 24 km (12 to 15 mi) from the nest site. Chicks fledge 42 to 46 days after hatching, and remain dependent on their parents for up to two months.

== Relationship with humans ==
=== Use in falconry ===
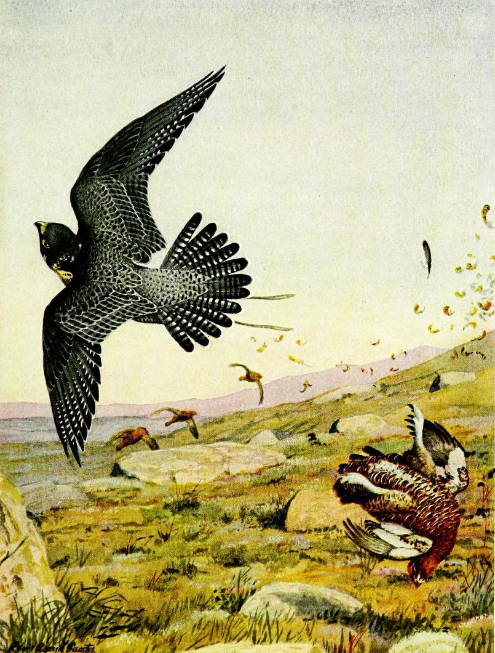
Tame peregrine striking a red grouse, by Louis Agassiz Fuertes (1920)

The peregrine falcon is a highly admired falconry bird, and has been used in falconry for more than 3,000 years, beginning with nomads in central Asia. Its advantages include not only its athleticism and eagerness to hunt, but an equable disposition that leads to it being one of the easier falcons to train. The peregrine falcon has the additional advantage of a natural flight style of circling above the falconer ("waiting on") for game to be flushed, and then performing a high-speed diving stoop to take the quarry. The speed of the stoop not only allows the falcon to catch fast flying birds, it also enhances the falcon's ability to execute maneuvers to catch highly agile prey, and allows the falcon to deliver a knockout blow with a fist-like clenched talon against game that may be much larger than itself.

Additionally the versatility of the species, with agility allowing capture of smaller birds and a strength and attacking style allowing capture of game much larger than themselves, combined with the wide size range of the many peregrine subspecies, means there is a subspecies suitable to almost any size and type of game bird. This size range, evolved to fit various environments and prey species, is from the larger females of the largest subspecies to the smaller males of the smallest subspecies, approximately five to one (approximately 1500 g to 300 g). The males of smaller and medium-sized subspecies, and the females of the smaller subspecies, excel in the taking of swift and agile small game birds such as dove, quail, and smaller ducks. The females of the larger subspecies are capable of taking large and powerful game birds such as the largest of duck species, pheasant, and grouse.

Peregrine falcons handled by falconers are also occasionally used to scare away birds at airports to reduce the risk of bird-plane strikes, improving air-traffic safety. They were also used to intercept homing pigeons during World War II.

Peregrine falcons have been successfully bred in captivity, both for falconry and for release into the wild. Until 2004 nearly all peregrines used for falconry in the US were captive-bred from the progeny of falcons taken before the US Endangered Species Act was enacted and from those few infusions of wild genes available from Canada and special circumstances. Peregrine falcons were removed from the United States' endangered species list in 1999. The successful recovery program was aided by the effort and knowledge of falconers – in collaboration with The Peregrine Fund and state and federal agencies – through a technique called hacking. Finally, after years of close work with the US Fish and Wildlife Service, a limited take of wild peregrines was allowed in 2004, the first wild peregrines taken specifically for falconry in over 30 years.

The development of captive breeding methods has led to peregrines being commercially available for falconry use, thus mostly eliminating the need to capture wild birds for support of falconry. The main reason for taking wild peregrines at this point is to maintain healthy genetic diversity in the breeding lines. Hybrids of peregrines and gyrfalcons are also available that can combine the best features of both species to create what many consider to be the ultimate falconry bird for the taking of larger game such as the sage-grouse. These hybrids combine the greater size, strength, and horizontal speed of the gyrfalcon with the natural propensity to stoop and greater warm weather tolerance of the peregrine.

Today, peregrines are regularly paired in captivity with other species such as the lanner falcon (F. biarmicus) to produce the "perilanner", a bird popular in falconry as it combines the peregrine's hunting skill with the lanner's hardiness, or the gyrfalcon to produce large, strikingly coloured birds for the use of falconers.

=== Decline due to pesticides ===
The peregrine falcon became an endangered species over much of its range because of the use of organochlorine pesticides, especially DDT, during the 1950s, '60s, and '70s. Pesticide biomagnification caused organochlorine to build up in the falcons' fat tissues, reducing the amount of calcium in their eggshells. With thinner shells, fewer falcon eggs survived until hatching. In addition, the PCB concentrations found in these falcons are dependent upon the age of the falcon. While high levels are still found in young birds (only a few months old) and even higher concentrations are found in more mature falcons, with levels peaking in adult peregrine falcons. These pesticides caused falcon prey to also have thinner eggshells (one example of prey being the black petrels). In several parts of the world, such as the southeastern US and Belgium, this species became locally extinct as a result. An alternate point of view is that populations in eastern North America had vanished due to hunting and egg collection. Following the ban of organochlorine pesticides, the reproductive success of Peregrines increased in Scotland in terms of territory occupancy and breeding success, although spatial variation in recovery rates indicate that in some areas Peregrines were also impacted by other factors such as persecution.

=== Recovery efforts ===
Peregrine falcon recovery teams breed the species in captivity. The chicks are usually fed through a chute or with a hand puppet mimicking a peregrine's head, so they cannot see to imprint on the human trainers. Then, when they are old enough, the rearing box is opened, allowing the bird to train its wings. As the fledgling gets stronger, feeding is reduced, forcing the bird to learn to hunt. This procedure is called hacking back to the wild. To release a captive-bred falcon, the bird is placed in a special cage at the top of a tower or cliff ledge for some days or so, allowing it to acclimate itself to its future environment.

Worldwide recovery efforts have been remarkably successful. The widespread restriction of DDT use eventually allowed released birds to breed successfully. The peregrine falcon was removed from the U.S. Endangered Species list on 25 August 1999.

Some controversy has existed over the origins of captive breeding stock used by the Peregrine Fund in the recovery of peregrine falcons throughout the contiguous United States. Several peregrine subspecies were included in the breeding stock, including birds of Eurasian origin. Due to the local extinction of the eastern population of Falco peregrinus anatum, its near-extinction in the Midwest, and the limited gene pool within North American breeding stock, the inclusion of non-native subspecies was justified to optimize the genetic diversity found within the species as a whole.

During the 1970s, peregrine falcons in Finland experienced a population bottleneck as a result of large declines associated with bio-accumulation of organochloride pesticides. However, the genetic diversity of peregrines in Finland is similar to other populations, indicating that high dispersal rates have maintained the genetic diversity of this species.

Since peregrine falcon eggs and chicks are still often targeted by illegal poachers, it is common practice not to publicise unprotected nest locations.

=== Current status ===
Populations of the peregrine falcon have bounced back in most parts of the world. In the United Kingdom, there has been a recovery of populations since the crash of the 1960s. This has been greatly assisted by conservation and protection work led by the Royal Society for the Protection of Birds. The RSPB estimated that there were 1,402 breeding pairs in the UK in 2011. In Canada, where peregrines were identified as endangered in 1978 (in the Yukon territory of northern Canada that year, only a single breeding pair was identified), the Committee on the Status of Endangered Wildlife in Canada declared the species no longer at risk in December 2017.

Peregrines now breed in many mountainous and coastal areas, especially in the west and north, and nest in some urban areas, capitalising on the urban feral pigeon populations for food. Additionally, falcons benefit from artificial illumination, which allows the raptors to extend their hunting periods into the dusk when natural illumination would otherwise be too low for them to pursue prey. In the UK, this has allowed them to prey on nocturnal migrants such as redwings, fieldfares, starlings, and woodcocks.

In many parts of the world peregrine falcons have adapted to urban habitats, nesting on cathedrals, skyscraper window ledges, and tower blocks. Many of these nesting birds are encouraged, sometimes gathering media attention and often monitored by cameras, (Note: See, for example, Cal Falcons Webcam and W.E.B. Du Bois FalconCam) but some falcons can be infected with human-borne pathogens and heavy metals from moving to more urban areas, which can be deadly for chicks.

In the UK, peregrine falcons have become increasingly urban in distribution, particularly in southern areas where inland cliffs suitable as nesting sites are scarce. The first recorded urban breeding pair was observed nesting on the Swansea Guildhall in the 1980s. In Southampton, a nest prevented restoration of mobile telephony services for several months in 2013, after Vodafone engineers despatched to repair a faulty transmitter mast discovered a nest in the mast, and were prevented by the Wildlife and Countryside Act – on pain of a possible prison sentence – from proceeding with repairs until the chicks fledged.

In Oregon, Portland houses ten percent of the state's peregrine nests, despite only covering around 0.1 percent of the state's land area.

== Cultural significance ==
Due to its striking hunting technique, the peregrine has often been associated with aggression and martial prowess. The Ancient Egyptian solar deity Ra was often represented as a man with the head of a peregrine falcon adorned with the solar disk, although most Egyptologists agree that it is most likely a Lanner falcon. Native Americans of the Mississippian culture (c. 800–1500) used the peregrine, along with several other birds of prey, in imagery as a symbol of "aerial (celestial) power" and buried men of high status in costumes associating to the ferocity of raptorial birds. In the late Middle Ages, the Western European nobility that used peregrines for hunting, considered the bird associated with princes in formal hierarchies of birds of prey, just below the gyrfalcon associated with kings. It was considered "a royal bird, more armed by its courage than its claws". Terminology used by peregrine breeders also used the Old French term gentil, "of noble birth; aristocratic", particularly with the peregrine.

Since 1927, the peregrine falcon has been the official mascot of Bowling Green State University in Bowling Green, Ohio. The 2007 U.S. Idaho state quarter features a peregrine falcon. The peregrine falcon has been designated the official city bird of Chicago.

The Peregrine, by J. A. Baker, is widely regarded as one of the best nature books in English written in the twentieth century. Admirers of the book include Robert Macfarlane, Mark Cocker, who regards the book as "one of the most outstanding books on nature in the twentieth century" and Werner Herzog, who called it "the one book I would ask you to read if you want to make films", and said elsewhere "it has prose of the calibre that we have not seen since Joseph Conrad". In the book, Baker recounts, in diary form, his detailed observations of peregrines (and their interaction with other birds) near his home in Chelmsford, Essex, over a single winter from October to April.

An episode of the hour-long TV series Starman in 1986 titled "Peregrine" was about an injured peregrine falcon and the endangered species program. It was filmed with the assistance of the University of California's peregrine falcon project in Santa Cruz.

In 1999, the Suzuki Corporation of Japan named a new motorcycle Hayabusa (隼 or はやぶさ、ハヤブサ), Japanese for peregrine falcon. Suzuki claims that the top Hayabusa model was the fastest production motorcycle in the world at that time.

== See also ==
- List of birds by flight speed
- Perilanner, a hybrid of the peregrine falcon and the lanner falcon (Falco biarmicus)
- Perlin, a hybrid of the peregrine falcon and the merlin (Falco columbarius)

== Sources ==
- American Ornithologists' Union (1910). Check-list of North American Birds (Third ed.). American Ornithologists' Union.
- Blondel, J.; Aronson, J. (1999). Biology and Wildlife of the Mediterranean Region. Oxford University Press. p. 136. ISBN 978-0-19-850035-3.
- Beckstead, D. (9 April 2001). "American Peregrine Falcon". U.S. National Park Service. Archived from the original on 17 October 2007.
- Brown, L. (1976). Birds of Prey: Their biology and ecology. Hamlyn. p. 226. ISBN 978-0-600-31306-9.
- Dalgleish, R.C., ed. (30 August 2003). "Falconidae – Falcons, Caracaras". Birds and their associated Chewing Lice. Archived from the original on 19 December 2007.
- Döttlinger, H. (2002). The Black Shaheen Falcon. Books on Demand. ISBN 978-3-8311-3626-1.
- Döttlinger, H.; Nicholls, M. (2005). "Distribution and population trends of the 'black shaheen' Peregrine Falcon Falco peregrinus peregrinator and the eastern Peregrine Falcon F. p. calidus in Sri Lanka" (PDF). Forktail. 21: 133–138.
- Evans, Dafydd (1970). "The Nobility of Knight and Falcon". In Harper-Bill, Christopher; Harvey, Ruth (eds.). The Ideals and Practice of Medieval Knighthood. Vol. III. Woodbridge: The Boydell Press. ISBN 978-0-85115-265-3.
- Griffiths, C.S. (1999). "Phylogeny of the Falconidae inferred from molecular and morphological data" (PDF). Auk. 116 (1): 116–130. doi:10.2307/4089459. JSTOR 4089459.
- Griffiths, C.S.; Barrowclough, G.F.; Groth, Jeff G.; Mertz, Lisa (2004). "Phylogeny of the Falconidae (Aves): a comparison of the efficacy of morphological, mitochondrial, and nuclear data". Molecular Phylogenetics and Evolution. 32 (1): 101–109. Bibcode:2004MolPE..32..101G. doi:10.1016/j.ympev.2003.11.019. PMID 15186800.
- Groombridge, J.J.; Jones, C.G.; Bayes, M.K.; van Zyl, A.J.; Carrillo, J.; Nichols, R.A.; Bruford, M.W. (2002). "A molecular phylogeny of African kestrels with reference to divergence across the Indian Ocean". Molecular Phylogenetics and Evolution. 25 (2): 267–277. Bibcode:2002MolPE..25..267G. doi:10.1016/S1055-7903(02)00254-3. PMID 12414309.
- Helbig, A.J.; Seibold, I.; Bednarek, W.; Brüning, H.; Gaucher, P.; Ristow, D.; Scharlau, W.; Schmidl, D.; Wink, M. (1994). "Phylogenetic relationships among falcon species (genus Falco) according to DNA sequence variation of the cytochrome b gene" (PDF). In Meyburg, B.-U.; Chancellor, R.D. (eds.). Raptor Conservation Today. Berlin: WWGBP. pp. 593–599. Archived (PDF) from the original on 3 December 2022.
- Krech, Shepard (2009). Spirits of the Air: Birds & American Indians in the South. University of Georgia Press. ISBN 978-0-8203-2815-7.
- Mayr, E. (1941). "Birds collected during the Whitney South Sea Expedition 45, Notes on New Guinea birds. 8". American Museum Novitates: 1133. hdl:2246/4833.
- Nittinger, F.; Haring, E.; Pinsker, W.; Wink, M.; Gamauf, A. (2005). "Out of Africa? Phylogenetic relationships between Falco biarmicus and other hierofalcons (Aves Falconidae)". Journal of Zoological Systematics and Evolutionary Research. 43 (4): 321–331. doi:10.1111/j.1439-0469.2005.00326.x.
- Peters, J.L.; Mayr, E.; Cottrell, W. (1979). Check-list of Birds of the World. Museum of Comparative Zoology.
- Peterson, R.T. (1976). A Field Guide to the Birds of Texas: And Adjacent States. Houghton Mifflin Field Guides. ISBN 978-0-395-92138-8.
- Proctor, N.; Lynch, P. (1993). Manual of Ornithology: Avian Structure & Function. Yale University Press. ISBN 978-0-300-07619-6.
- Raidal, S.; Jaensch, S.; Ende, J. (1999). "Preliminary Report of a Parasitic Infection of the Brain and Eyes of a Peregrine Falcon Falco peregrinus and Nankeen Kestrels Falco cenchroides in Western Australia". Emu. 99 (4): 291–292. Bibcode:1999EmuAO..99..291R. doi:10.1071/MU99034A.
- Raidal, S.; Jaensch, S. (2000). "Central nervous disease and blindness in Nankeen kestrels (Falco cenchroides) due to a novel Leucocytozoon-like infection". Avian Pathology. 29 (1): 51–56. doi:10.1080/03079450094289. PMID 19184789.
- "Peregrine Falcon". State of Queensland Environmental Protection Agency. 2011. Archived from the original on 28 April 2015.
- Towry, R.K. (1987). "Wildlife habitat requirements". In Hoover, R.L.; Wills, D.L. (eds.). Managing Forested Lands for Wildlife. Denver, Colorado: Colorado Division of Wildlife. pp. 73–210.
- Tucker, V.A. (1998). "Gliding flight: speed and acceleration of ideal falcons during diving and pull out". Journal of Experimental Biology. 201 (3): 403–414. Bibcode:1998JExpB.201..403T. doi:10.1242/jeb.201.3.403. PMID 9427673.
- Vaurie, C. (1961). "Systematic notes on Palearctic birds. No. 44, Falconidae, the genus Falco. (Part 1, Falco peregrinus and Falco pelegrinoides)". American Museum Novitates (2035): 1–19. hdl:2246/3466.
- Wink, M.; Seibold, I.; Lotfikhah, F.; Bednarek, W. (1998). "Molecular systematics of holarctic raptors (Order Falconiformes)" (PDF). In Chancellor, R.D.; Meyburg, B.-U.; Ferrero, J.J. (eds.). Holarctic Birds of Prey. Adenex & WWGBP. pp. 29–48.
- Wink, M.; Sauer-Gürth, H. (2000). "Advances in the molecular systematics of African raptors" (PDF). In Chancellor, R.D.; Meyburg, B.-U. (eds.). Raptors at Risk. WWGBP/Hancock House, Berlin/Blaine. pp. 135–147. Archived from the original (PDF) on 7 April 2023.
- Wink, M.; Döttlinger, H.; Nicholls, M.K.; Sauer-Gürth, H. (2000). "Phylogenetic relationships between Black Shaheen (Falco peregrinus peregrinator), Red-naped Shaheen (F. pelegrinoides babylonicus) and Peregrines (F. peregrinus)" (PDF). In Chancellor, R.D.; Meyburg, B.-U. (eds.). Raptors at Risk. WWGBP/Hancock House, Berlin/Blaine. pp. 853–857. Archived (PDF) from the original on 10 March 2022.
- Wink, M.; Sauer-Gürth, H.; Ellis, D.; Kenward, R. (2004). "Phylogenetic relationships in the Hierofalco complex (Saker-, Gyr-, Lanner-, Laggar Falcon)" (PDF). In Chancellor, R.D.; Meyburg, B.-U. (eds.). Raptors Worldwide. Berlin: WWGBP. pp. 499–504. Archived (PDF) from the original on 6 April 2023.
