= Henry de Hinuber =

Hanoverian army officer (1767–1833)

Lieutenant-General Henry de Hinuber KCB KCH
- Eduard Christoph Heinrich von Hinüber
- Born: 25 January 1767; London, England
- Died: 2 December 1833 (aged 66); Frankfurt, German Confederation
- Other name: Heinrich von Hinüber
- Spouse: Sophie Marie Lucie Eleonore Fahle (m. 1815)
- Military career
- Allegiance: Electorate of Hanover; United Kingdom; Kingdom of Hanover
- Branch: Hanoverian Army; British Army; German Federal Army
- Service years: 1781–1803: Hanover; 1803–1816: Britain; 1816–1833: Hanover
- Rank: Lieutenant-General
- Nickname: Harry
- Unit: King's German Legion
- Commands: KGL Depot; 3rd Line Battalion, KGL; KGL Brigade, 1st Division; KGL Division; 4th Division; 3rd Hanoverian Infantry Brigade; 2nd Hanoverian Infantry Brigade; 2nd Division, Federal German Army
- Conflicts: Second Anglo-Mysore War; Siege of Cuddalore (WIA); Third Anglo-Mysore War; French Revolutionary Wars; Flanders Campaign; Battle of Tourcoing; Napoleonic Wars; Invasion of Hanover; Hanover Expedition; Copenhagen Expedition; Peninsular War; Battle of Nivelle; Battle of the Nive; Battle of Bayonne (WIA)
- Awards: Army Gold Medal

Lieutenant-General Henry de Hinuber, KCB, KCH (25 January 1767 – 2 December 1833) known in Hanover as Eduard Christoph Heinrich von Hinüber, was a Hanoverian army officer who commanded units of the King's German Legion (KGL) during the Napoleonic Wars. Initially serving in the Hanoverian Army, in 1782, he fought in the Second Anglo-Mysore War in India. He was present at the Siege of Cuddalore and remained in India until 1792. The French Revolutionary Wars began a year later and Hinuber served in the Flanders Campaign.

Hinuber was one of the first Hanoverians to offer his services to the British Army when Hanover was invaded in 1803. Given command of the 3rd Line Battalion of the KGL, he fought in the Hanover and Copenhagen Expeditions before commanding a brigade in a diversionary attack in the Bay of Naples in 1809. He was promoted to major-general in 1811 and given command of a brigade in Lord Wellington's Peninsular War army in 1813.

Hinuber commanded his brigade at the Battle of Nivelle in 1813 and then at the Siege of Bayonne the following year, when he led the response to the French counter-attack. At the start of the Hundred Days, Hinuber was in command of the 4th Division but, replaced by a more senior officer, he refused another command and missed the Battle of Waterloo. He joined the army of the new Kingdom of Hanover in 1816, commanding several infantry brigades, and was promoted to lieutenant-general in both British and Hanoverian service. In 1831, Hinuber received his last command, the 2nd Division of a corps of the German Federal Army. He died in Frankfurt two years later.

== Early life ==
Eduard Christoph Heinrich von Hinüber was born on 25 January 1767 in London. Known to family and friends as Harry, he was the son of Hanoverians Carl Heinrich von Hinüber (1723–1792) and Margarethe Ludovica von Reiche (1736–1815). His elder brother was Georg Charlotte von Hinüber, and he had four other siblings. His father was the German tutor to George II's children. Hinüber, who was fluent in English, lived with his parents in London until he reached the age of 10 or 12, at which point he was sent to live with his uncle in Hanover so that he could receive German education. There his family was part of the bureaucratic elite and relatives such as Jobst Anton von Hinüber played an important part in the moulding of Hanoverian culture.

== Hanoverian Army ==
=== Home service ===
Hinüber joined the Hanoverian Army as a cadet in the Hanoverian Foot Guards in April 1781 and was commissioned as an ensign in the 15th Infantry Regiment on 1 July. George III ruled both Hanover and Britain, and so the regiment had been formed in May to go to India and reinforce the British Army in the Second Anglo-Mysore War. In fighting this, the Kingdom of Mysore was allied with France, which was at war with Britain in the Anglo-French War. The Hanoverians had contracts to serve in India for seven years. The regiment underwent a seven-month period of training in Hanover and then from October in England. Hinüber was promoted to lieutenant on 27 November. The 15th left for Madras in March 1782, arriving in September.

=== India ===
Hinüber was part of an Anglo-Indian army which attacked the French-held city of Cuddalore on 13 July 1783. In a bloody engagement the British failed to break through the French defences. A quarter of the Hanoverians became casualties, including Hinüber who was wounded in action. The allied force occupied the abandoned French outposts around the city and instead began to besiege Cuddalore. Disease was rife in the camps of both the defenders and attackers, and the siege was still ongoing in July when news of the Treaty of Paris ending the Anglo-French War reached it. The Hanoverians were kept on in India afterwards, some moving into Mysore to continue the Second Anglo-Mysore War, reinforcing Mangalore and attacking Cannanore. Conflict with Mysore ended in March 1784. By August 1785 the Hanoverians were serving as the garrison at Arcot, where they stayed until being transferred to Madras in 1787.

While in India, the regiment was renumbered as the 14th Infantry Regiment and Hinüber was promoted to captain on 6 April 1788. The seven-year contracts of the Hanoverians began to end in the following year, but when the Third Anglo-Mysore War began it was requested that some stay on in India. The troops were given the choice of returning to Europe or staying on for another year. Hinüber opted for the latter, finally departing in July 1792. The Hanoverians had taken high losses through battle and disease, only half surviving. Hinüber was one of the last Hanoverians to leave the sub-continent.

=== Flanders and defeat ===
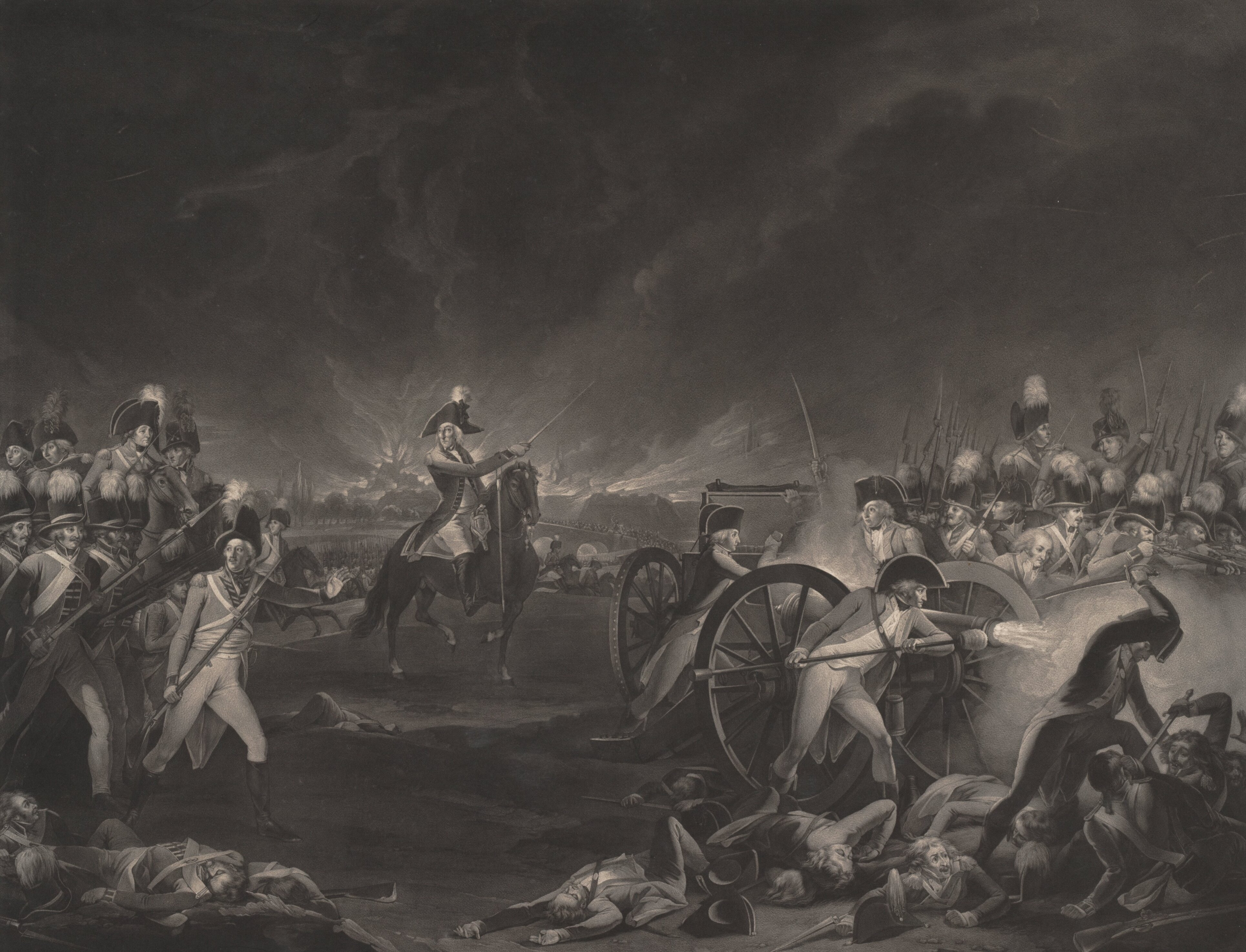
The breakout from the siege of Menin on 29 April 1794

Upon returning from India, Hinüber's regiment was reformed as the 14th Light Infantry Regiment. The French Revolutionary Wars began in February 1793, and for the first two years of the conflict Hinüber and his regiment were stationed in the Netherlands. Fighting the Flanders Campaign, the regiment was seconded to serve with the British Army on 22 January 1794, formed in two battalions. In April the regiment was sent to join the garrison of Menin, which was preparing to be besieged by the French. On 29 April the 1,800-strong garrison escaped a besieging French army of 14,000 men, suffering heavy casualties as it fought through to Roeselare.

The regiment subsequently formed part of the Northern covering column during the defeat at the Battle of Tourcoing between 17 and 18 May. By 15 August the two battalions of the regiment had separated, one garrisoning Sas van Gent and Hulst, and the other defending Sluis. The latter battalion became prisoners of war on 25 August when the port was captured. The campaign over, the last units of the British Army sailed from the continent on 1 June 1795. The Hanoverians returned to their native country, garrisoning barracks and settling to recruit themselves back to full strength.

Hinüber was promoted to major on 26 October 1798, joining the 6th Infantry Regiment. The Hanoverian Army served in relative peace until the Napoleonic Wars began in 1803; France successfully invaded Hanover, occupying the capital on 4 June. The Hanoverian Army retreated into Saxe-Lauenburg but quickly surrendered. Under the Convention of Artlenburg on 5 July the army was disbanded, ending Hinüber's service.

== British Army ==
=== Forming the King's German Legion ===
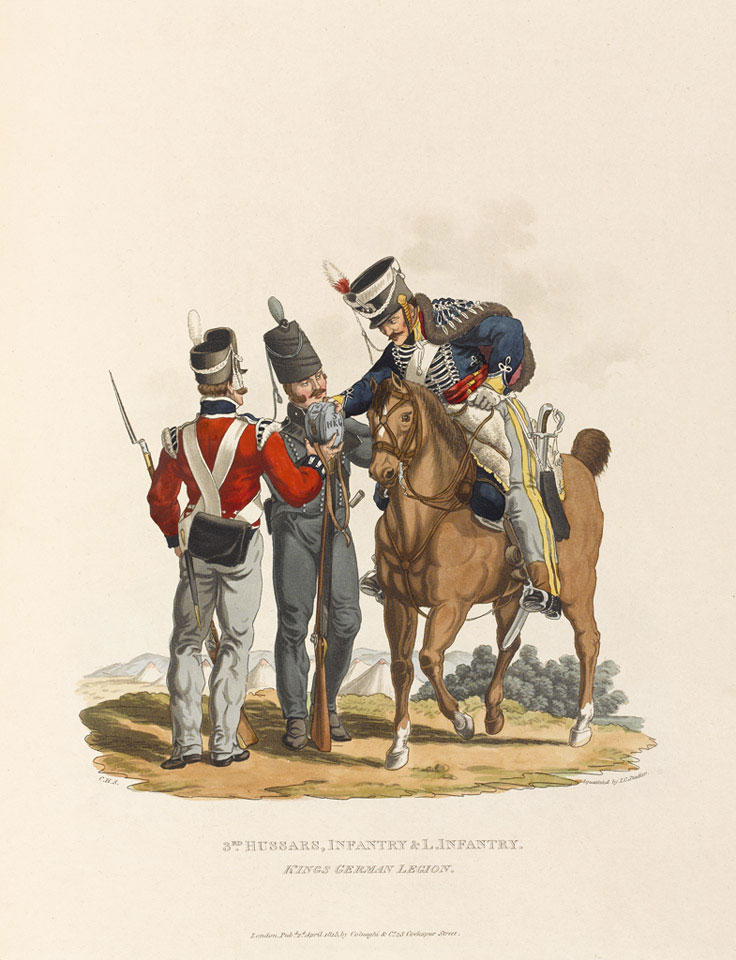
Soldiers of the King's German Legion; L–R line infantry, light infantry, and hussar

Hinüber was one of the first Hanoverian officers to travel to Britain and offer their military services there, arriving at Harwich on about 31 July. George III formed the King's German Legion (KGL) as a unit for displaced Hanoverians, and the officers were given temporary ranks in the British Army. In British service Hinüber chose to go by the name of Henry de Hinuber, but was also recorded as Heinrich von Hinüber. In early August he was stationed at Plymouth organising German arrivals, as well as recruiting Portuguese, Danish, Austrian, and Norwegian prisoners of war from the prison hulks there.

The initial patent for the KGL required it to reach 400 men within three months. Working closely with a fellow Hanoverian, Friedrich von der Decken, Hinuber initially expressed doubts to him that they would be able to meet the 400-man requirement. Hinuber championed the recruitment from prison hulks to bolster their numbers. By 3 October the regiment had reached a complement of 450. The KGL expanded quickly as the month went on, and an officer of Hinuber's seniority was no longer needed to chivvy recruitment at Plymouth. On 13 October he was transferred to command the new regimental depot, situated on the Isle of Wight, with about 1,000 men under his command. Initial expectation had been to form one light infantry battalion from the men at the depot but, when more recruits arrived than expected, the KGL expanded with artillery and cavalry as well. Soldiers who had previously served in either of these branches were taken away from Hinuber's main cadre, leaving the remainder there to form the 1st and 2nd Line Battalions.

Hinuber joined the newly formed 1st Battalion, and was given the British rank of major on 17 November. The KGL continued recruitment on the European mainland through this period, with a headquarters at Husum from where Germans could travel to Heligoland before reaching Britain. In April 1804 Hinuber was given command of this system, travelling to Husum to help raise the 3rd Line Battalion which was officially formed in May. He was promoted to lieutenant-colonel on 16 June, commanding the new battalion, and relinquished his recruiting duties on 21 September.

=== Initial service ===
Hinuber was promoted to colonel on 9 July 1805 and in November led his battalion in the Hanover Expedition, an attempt to liberate the Electorate. The force began to besiege Hamelin, but on 2 December the allied Austro-Russian army was defeated at the Battle of Austerlitz, forcing the withdrawal of the expedition.

The KGL returned to Britain in February 1806 and Hinuber's was one of several battalions that moved on to garrisons in Ireland. In June 1807 the 3rd was part of two KGL divisions sent in an army to Swedish Pomerania to assist the Russians. Landing on Rügen in early July, it was withdrawn from mainland Europe again when Russia brokered a peace with France in the Treaties of Tilsit later in the month. The battalion then joined another expedition, this time to Copenhagen. The KGL led the initial assault on 24 August as a prelude to the bombardment of the city which began on 2 September. Copenhagen surrendered five days later. The force returned to Britain in October. In late December Hinuber's battalion was one of four from the KGL sent to Lisbon. Upset by storms in the Bay of Biscay, the British were not able to arrive before the French took control of the city. The force was moved to serve as part of the garrison on Sicily, arriving after five months at sea on 24 March 1808.

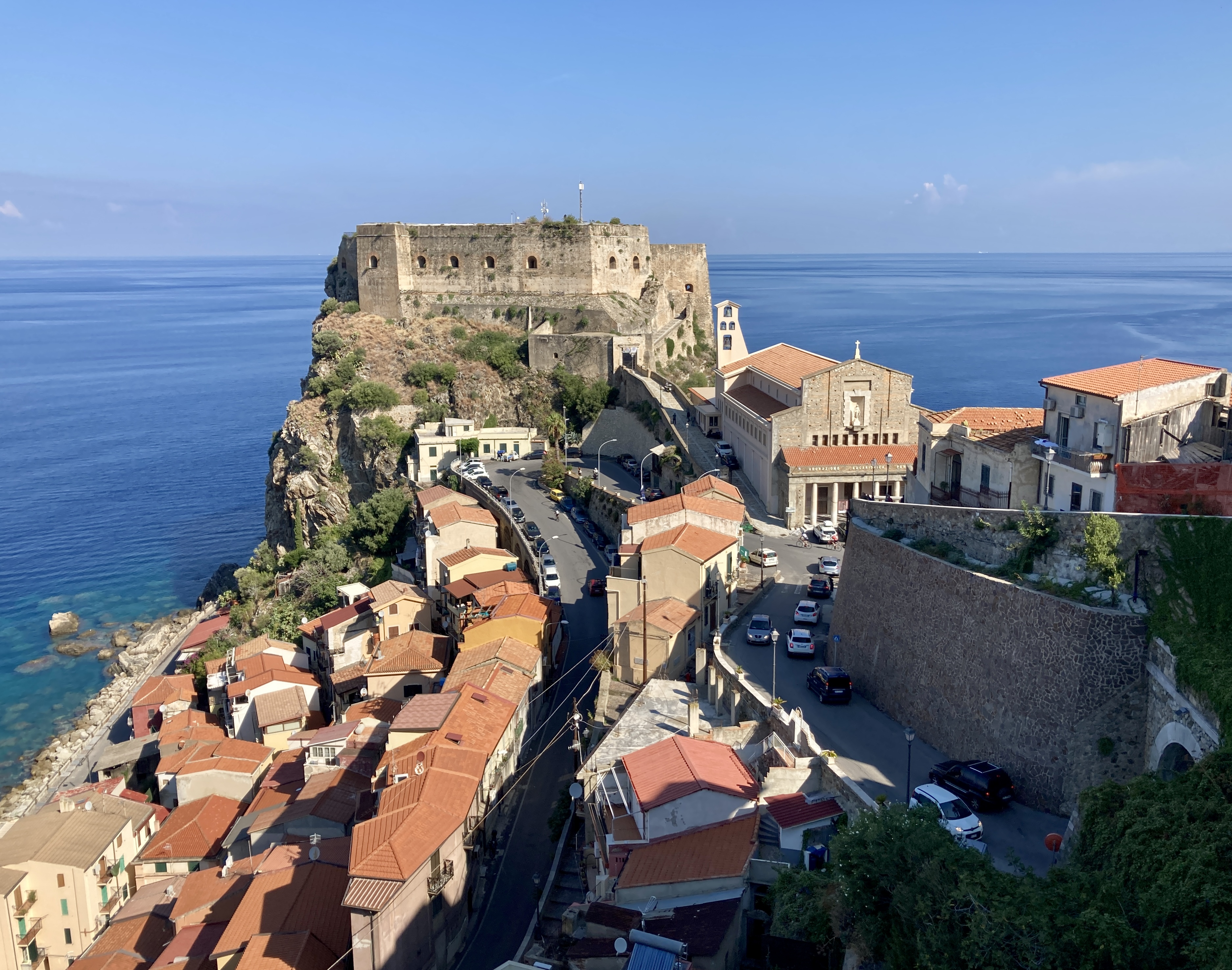
The castle at Scylla, unsuccessfully besieged in June 1809

Having remained in Sicily, in mid-1809 Hinuber was given command of a KGL brigade as part of a diversionary attack on islands in the Bay of Naples, intended to take pressure off their Austrian allies on the continent. The brigade contained his own battalion and the KGL's 4th Line Battalion. The force, commanded by Lieutenant-General Sir John Stuart, sailed on 11 June and reached Ischia on 24 June. The neighbouring island Procida capitulated on 26 June and after a siege Ischia surrendered on 30 June. Offensive operations at Scylla went on from 13 June, but by 28 June the town had not been captured. As the Royal Navy was unable to guarantee the lines of supply for the army, Stuart chose to evacuate the two captured islands. The whole force had returned to Sicily by 26 July.

Hinuber continued on in the Mediterranean after the completion of his brigade command and was present in September 1810 during the defence against Marshal Joachim Murat's attempted invasion of Sicily. On 4 June 1811 Hinuber was promoted to major-general and given a position on the military staff in Sicily. Having held only temporary rank, Hinuber was granted permanent rank as a British major-general on 18 August of the following year; this was a reward for all KGL officers after the success of the Legion cavalry at the Battle of Garcia Hernandez on 23 July. Hinuber continued as colonel of the regiment, or colonel commandant, of the 3rd Line Battalion for the rest of its existence.

=== Peninsular War ===
Hinuber served in Sicily until 30 October 1813 when he joined the army of Field Marshal Lord Wellington in the Peninsular War. He had been given command of the KGL brigade serving as part of the 1st Division on 25 June but, as he was still serving in Sicily, Colonel Colin Halkett had acted in his stead. Hinuber's new command was the largest brigade in Wellington's army, totalling five KGL battalions with 3,000 men between them. It contained the 1st and 2nd Light Battalions and the 1st, 2nd, and 5th Line Battalions. He subsequently led his brigade at the Battle of Nivelle on 10 November, participating in diversionary attacks on the fortified river.

==== Investment of Bayonne ====
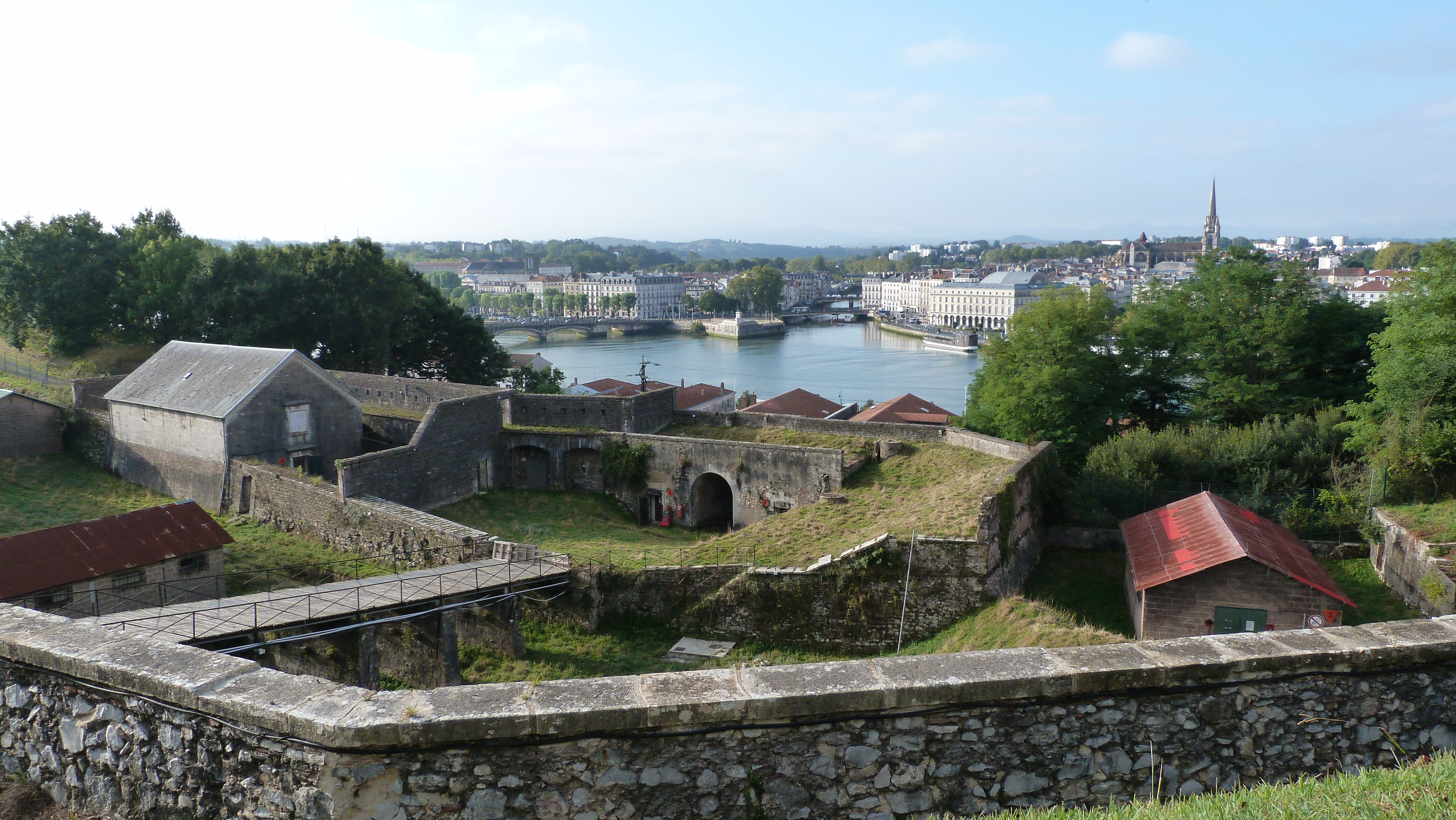
Surviving fortifications in Bayonne

In the subsequent advance on Bayonne, the KGL was employed during the Battle of the Nive in attacking the French outpost at Anglet on 9 December. Fighting ended when Hinuber's two light battalions turned the French flank and forced them to retreat into Bayonne.

Hinuber was respected as a competent commander, but his relationship with Wellington was difficult. The Siege of Bayonne began the following year, and on 27 February the suburb of St. Etienne was stormed by a force including Hinuber's brigade to complete the encirclement of the city. Having not resisted the advance before this, the French strongly defended St. Etienne. In a battle lasting most of the day, the British fought through the suburb street by street, eventually forcing the French to retire.

The brigade had over 300 casualties in the fighting including Hinuber, who was wounded. Despite the part played by the brigade, Hinuber's commanding officer Lieutenant-General Sir John Hope downplayed its role, refusing to name any of the units involved. Wellington's dispatch on the battle was similarly muted on the KGL's performance.

Annoyed by Hope's conduct, Hinuber wrote to the colonel-in-chief of the KGL Prince Adolphus, Duke of Cambridge, to complain. Adolphus replied to Hinuber that he expressed "to all the officers and men, my public approbation of their conduct, and the satisfaction which I feel in being at the head of such a corps". Nonetheless, Hinuber also wrote to Major-General Edward Pakenham, Wellington's adjutant general:

...the silence of [Wellington] in this instance cannot be attributed to casual omission, but must be founded on some particular reason, and the only one which we can at all guess at – however painful to our feelings – is that from some circumstance unknown to us, we have incurred his lordship's displeasure, and that laboring under such, we must necessarily be precluded from the honours which a public notice of our services, would otherwise have bestowed upon us.

Wellington sent a terse reply to Hinuber through Pakenham on the matter, the latter reporting to Hinuber that:

...am desired to observe that [Wellington] has ever had the pleasure in being satisfied with the conduct of the legion...I am in no way authorized to enter into further explanation on the subject to which your communication relates, but I should recommend you to subdue any anxiety that may have risen...

==== Battle of Bayonne ====
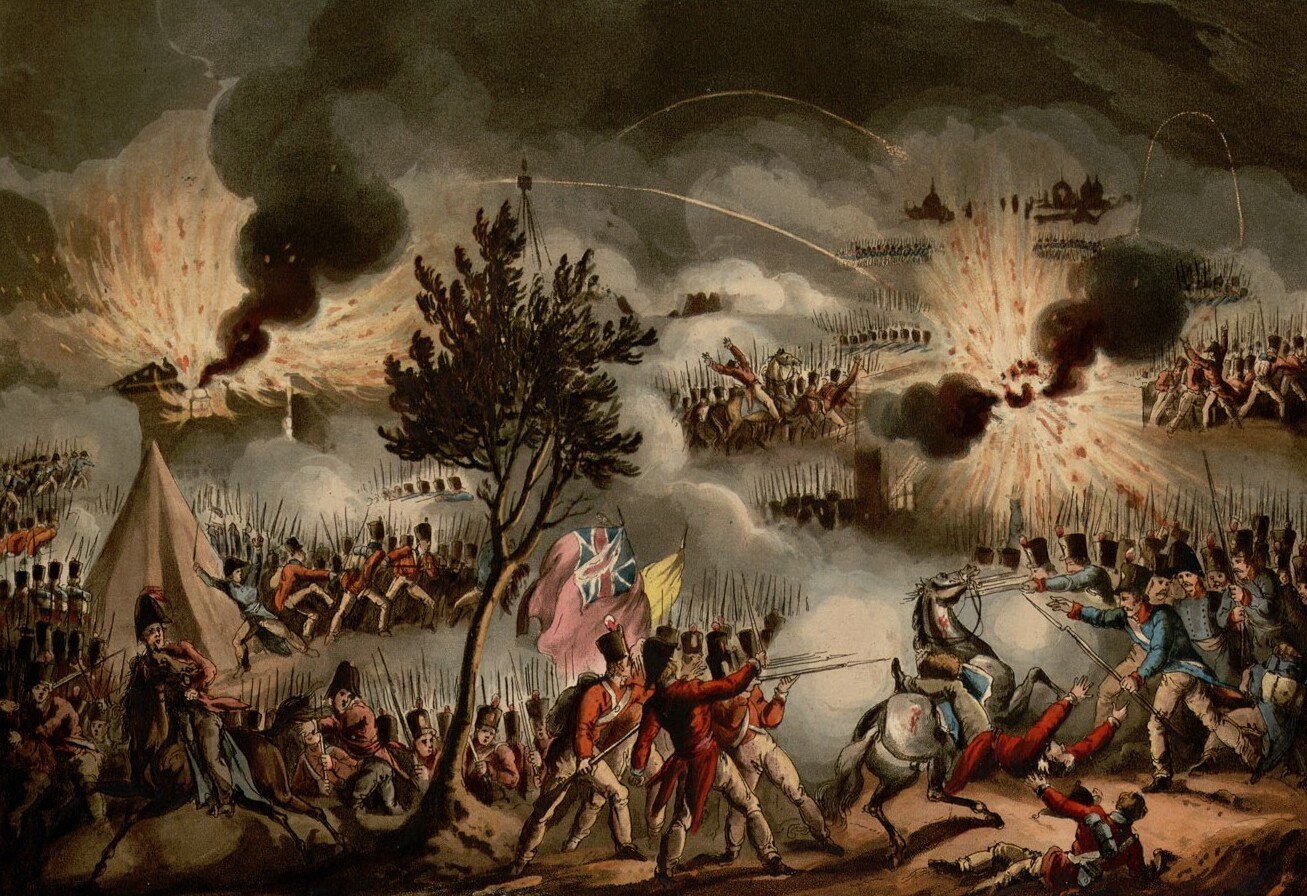
The French attack at the Battle of Bayonne on 14 April

In the night of 13 April two French deserters from Bayonne came to Major-General Andrew Hay, who was commanding the piquets, to warn him of the French plan to make an attack on the Anglo-Spanish besieging force. Hay could not speak French so had them speak to Hinuber, who translated the report. Hay acknowledged this but made no changes to his defences, while Hinuber made Hope aware of the news and prepared his men for action. Before dawn on 14 April the French attacked with 3,000 men, far more than Hay had expected. The sortie broke through the British piquets and recaptured St. Etienne. Hinuber, acting without orders, brought his battalions forward from the Adour River with two Portuguese units and led the counter-attack at St. Etienne.

Rallying the surviving members of the piquet forces around the St. Etienne church, Hinuber pushed the French column attacking it back out of the suburb. With another brigade also counter-attacking, soon afterwards the French were ordered to withdraw back into Bayonne. The engagement ended when a truce was organised to allow for the collection of the wounded and dead.

The KGL had 189 casualties including Hinuber, who received a severe contusion. Hay was killed in the attack and Hope was captured along with his staff. The nineteenth-century military historian Sir William Napier noted that "...the readiness and gallantry with which General Hinuber and his Germans retook St. Etienne saved the allies from a very terrible disaster".

=== Peacetime occupation ===
Bayonne surrendered on 28 April upon receiving the official order from Paris to do so, confirming Napoleon's abdication. A Subsidiary Army was afterwards formed to continue on in mainland Europe, and Hinuber was given command of the KGL Division within it, stationed mostly at Tournai and Mons. This made him the commander of all KGL infantry in the Netherlands, with six line battalions and two light battalions. The KGL was kept separate from the other British Army units serving in the Low Countries, in expectation that it would soon be disbanded and incorporated into a new Hanoverian Army.

Hinuber was rewarded for his services during the war, being appointed an Honorary Knight Commander of the Order of the Bath on 2 January 1815, and in the same year becoming a Knight Commander of the Royal Guelphic Order. He was also awarded the Army Gold Medal with a clasp for his service at the Battle of Nivelle.

=== Hundred Days ===
Napoleon escaped from his confinement on Elba in March 1815, restarting the conflict, and Wellington returned to the continent to form a new Anglo-Allied Army. Hinuber's KGL Division was re-formed into two brigades and split between the 2nd and 3rd Divisions to ensure that the newly arrived British units received a core of experienced soldiers. Hinuber himself was given command of the 4th Division on 11 April. He was, however, a relatively junior major-general and on 28 April he was replaced in command by Major-General Sir Charles Colville, who held local rank as a lieutenant-general.

Frustrated by the loss of his division, Hinuber continued his tense relationship with Wellington by arguing that as he had originally been given command of all the KGL infantry in the country by Adolphus, he should continue in that specific appointment. Wellington wrote to the Military Secretary, Major-General Sir Henry Torrens, on 2 May requesting clarification as to whether he was required to give Hinuber command of a new division made up of all the KGL in the army. Torrens wrote back on 5 May that:

...though [Adolphus] puts a very high value on [Hinuber's] services, he could not consider himself justified in authorising that the Legion should be kept together in order that he should command them...[Wellington] will be pleased to accept the resignation of his Staff appointment.

Hinuber did as suggested, refusing an offer to instead take command of a KGL brigade, and resigned his position in Wellington's army on 9 May. He travelled initially into Hanover before returning to England. Hinuber thus missed the Hundred Days campaign which culminated in the Battle of Waterloo, but was still listed as one of the recipients of the thanks of the Parliament of the United Kingdom for the victory. The military historians Ron McGuigan and Robert Burnham argue that if Hinuber had stayed with the army through the campaign, the high level of casualties amongst the generals would have made him a divisional commander anyway.

== Return to Hanoverian service ==
"May a time approach in which our nation, happily great and independently safe, will be able to develop every now restricted disposition and force, being an intimate State connection with the great German family, ruled by such Regents as those under whose century of government the British realm has been exalted to the most glorious and the happiest on earth."

— Excerpt from Hinuber's response to a letter of admiration from Hanoverian politicians, 15 January 1815.

With Napoleon defeated for a final time, the KGL was disbanded on 24 February 1816 and Hinuber placed on British Army half-pay. He chose to join the newly re-created Hanoverian Army of the Kingdom of Hanover, which recognised the British Army ranks of any ex-KGL officers who joined. Hinuber began his service as a major-general early in the year, but with seniority backdated to 4 June 1811, when he was promoted in British service.

Hinuber was appointed colonel of the regiment to the 5th Hanoverian Infantry Regiment on 1 March, a position he would hold until his death. His first command in the new Hanoverian Army was the 3rd Hanoverian Infantry Brigade. While in this position he was promoted to lieutenant-general on 17 April 1818.

Hanover was part of the German Confederation, centrally organised by the Federal Convention. In the same month as his promotion, Hinuber was appointed to serve on the new Militärcomité, or Military Committee, set up by the convention. The committee comprised twelve military attachés from different German states, all general officers of considerable military experience. It was expected to assist the Federal Convention on technical military matters relating to the creation of the German Federal Army, but had no direct power itself. The historian Hellmut Seier describes Hinuber as one of the committee's most influential generals. The Militärcomité was tasked to create the Federal War Constitution to codify the new army and was dissolved after this was completed on 12 October.

The Federal Convention took some of the members of the committee to form a permanent Bundesmilitärkommission, or Military Commission, on 15 March 1819. Hinuber was one of six kept on in the new entity. (Note: The other five initial members of the Bundesmilitärkommission (lit. 'Federal Military Commission') were Major-Generals Friedrich Karl Gustav, Baron von Langenau (Austria), Ludwig von Wolzogen (Prussia), Nikolaus von Maillot de la Treille (Bavaria), Johann Adolf von Zezschwitz (Saxony), and Ferdinand Varnbüler von und zu Hemmingen (Wurttemberg).) The commission was tasked with providing military advice to the Federal Convention, and also supervised the functioning, upkeep, and equipping of federal military fortifications. The representatives mostly used their positions to instead champion their own nation's military interests within the Confederation. Hinuber continued in command of the 3rd alongside this until 1 April 1820, when he was transferred to the command of the 2nd Hanoverian Infantry Brigade.

While on British half pay, Hinuber was also promoted to lieutenant-general on 12 August 1819. He continued to be included in the Army List, but was withheld any pay or further promotion. He travelled to Luxembourg alongside Lieutenant-General Ludwig von Wolzogen in March 1826 where they took formal possession of the Fortress of Luxembourg on behalf of the German Confederation. Continuing in Hanoverian service, he retired from the British Army in the following year. On 18 February 1831 Hinuber was given command of the 2nd Division of the German Federal Army's X Army Corps. Simultaneously he represented his corps at the Federal Convention, situated in Frankfurt. He died there from an inflammation of the lungs, possibly caused by an ulcer and described as mastitis, on 2 December 1833.

== Personal life ==
Hinuber married Sophie Marie Lucie Eleonore Fahle (1787–1868) in St Martin-in-the-Fields, London, on 7 August 1815. Fahle was the daughter of Johann Heinrich Georg Wilhelm Fahle, a corporal in the KGL, and the sister of Wilhelm Fahle, a KGL sergeant. Together the couple had five children, the first of whom was pre-marital. Their children included:

- Harriet von Hinüber (13 April 1813 – 9 October 1875), married Major Friedrich von Oeynhausen in 1839.
- Major Heinrich William Hinüber (30 May 1816 – 5 April 1849), Imperial Austrian Army hussar officer.
- Lieutenant Eduard Hinüber (24 December 1817 – 28 December 1880), Hanoverian Army officer.

== Sources ==
- Angelow, Jürgen (1996). Von Wien nach Königgrätz: Die Sicherheitspolitik des Deutschen Bundes im europäischen Gleichgewicht 1815–1866 [From Vienna to Königgrätz: The Security Policy of the German Confederation in the European Balance 1815–1866] (in German). Munich: R. Oldenbourg. ISBN 3-486-56143-X.
- Bamford, Andrew (Summer 2015). "'Infamous', or Incomplete? The Origins and Structure of Wellington's 1815 Field Army". Journal of the Society for Army Historical Research. 93 (374): 102–119. ISSN 0037-9700. JSTOR 44233039.
- Brown, Steve (2018). The Duke of York's Flanders Campaign 1793–1795. Yorkshire: Frontline Books. ISBN 978-1-52674-269-8.
- Burnham, Robert; McGuigan, Ron (2010). The British Army against Napoleon. Barnsley, South Yorkshire: Frontline Books. ISBN 978-1-84832-562-3.
- Chappell, Mike (2000). The King's German Legion 1803–1812. Oxford: Osprey. ISBN 978-1-855329-96-6.
- Demet, Paul (2018). 'We Are Accustomed To Do Our Duty': German Auxiliaries with the British Army 1793–95. Warwick: Helion. ISBN 978-1-912174-96-6.
- Fortescue, John (1912). A History of the British Army. Vol. 7. London: Macmillan and Co. OCLC 963664154.
- Gates, David (2002). The Spanish Ulcer: A History of the Peninsular War. London: Pimlico. ISBN 0-7126-9730-6.
- Gothaisches Genealogisches Taschenbuch der Briefadeligen Häuser [Gotha Genealogical Handbook of Houses Ennobled by Letters Patent] (in German). Gotha: Julius Berthes. 1909. OCLC 503835245.
- Gurwood, John (2010) [1844]. The Dispatches of Field Marshal the Duke of Wellington. Vol. 8. Cambridge: Cambridge University Press. ISBN 978-1-108-02522-5.
- Lipscombe, Nick (2014). Bayonne and Toulouse 1813–14. Oxford: Osprey. ISBN 978-1-4728 0278-1.
- Mastnak, Jens (2001). "Werbung und Ersatzwesen der Königlich Deutschen Legion 1803 bis 1813" [Recruiting and Replacement of the King's German Legion 1803 to 1813]. Militärgeschichtliche Zeitschrift (in German). 60: 119–142. doi:10.1524/mgzs.2001.60.1.119. ISSN 2193-2336.
- McGuigan, Ron; Burnham, Robert (2017). Wellington's Brigade Commanders. Barnsley, South Yorkshire: Pen & Sword Military. ISBN 978-1-47385-079-8.
- Napier, William (1882). History of the War in the Peninsula and in the South of France. Vol. 3. London: George Routledge and Sons. OCLC 1337805809.
- Oman, Charles (1930). A History of the Peninsular War. Vol. 7. Oxford: Clarendon Press. OCLC 59165239.
- Ompteda, Christian von; Ompteda, Louis von (1894). In the King's German Legion: Memoirs of Baron Ompteda. London: H. Grevel & Co. OCLC 847256367.
- Paget, Julian (1990). Wellington's Peninsular War. London: Leo Cooper. ISBN 0-85052-6035.
- Pivka, Otto von (1974). The King's German Legion. Oxford: Osprey. ISBN 978-1-4728-0229-3.
- Robertson, Ian C. (2000). Wellington at War in the Peninsula 1808–1814. Barnsley: Leo Cooper. ISBN 0-85052-660-4.
- Schwertfeger, Bernhard (1907). Geschichte der Königlich Deutschen Legion 1803–1816 [History of the King's German Legion 1803–1816] (in German). Hanover and Leipzig: Hahnsche Buchhandlung. OCLC 11854175.
- Seier, Hellmut (1977). "Der Oberbefehl im Bundesheer" [The Supreme Command in the Armed Forces]. Militärgeschichtliche Zeitschrift (in German). 21 (1): 7–34. doi:10.1524/mgzs.1977.21.1.7. ISSN 0026-3826.
- Smith, Digby (1998). Napoleonic Wars Data Book. London: Greenhill. ISBN 1-85367-276-9.
- "Latest News from Europe". The Sydney Gazette and New South Wales Advertiser. Vol. 24, no. 1230. New South Wales, Australia. 5 August 1826. p. 3 – via National Library of Australia.
- Tzoref-Ashkenazi, Chen (2009). "German Voices from India: Officers of the Hanoverian Regiments in East India Company Service". South Asia: Journal of South Asian Studies. 32 (2): 189–211. doi:10.1080/00856400903049473.
- Tzoref-Ashkenazi, Chen (2012). "German Auxiliary Troops in the British and Dutch East India Companies". In Arielli, Nir; Collins, Bruce (eds.). Transnational Soldiers: Foreign Military Enlistment in the Modern Era. Basingstoke: Palgrave Macmillan. ISBN 978-0-230-31968-4.
- Tzoref-Ashkenazi, Chen (2016). German Soldiers in Colonial India. Abingdon: Routledge. ISBN 978-1-84893-367-5.
- Ward, S. G. P. (2017) [1957]. Wellington's Headquarters. Barnsley, South Yorkshire: Pen & Sword Military. ISBN 978-1-47389-682-6.
- Warner, Richard (1977). Napoleon's Enemies. London: Osprey. ISBN 0-85045-172-8.
