= Invasion of Hanover =

Invasion of Hanover may refer to:

- Invasion of Hanover (1757) by French troops following the Battle of Hastenback
- 1801 invasion of Hanover by Prussian troops as part of the Second League of Armed Neutrality
- 1803 invasion of Hanover by French troops during the Napoleonic Wars
- 1866 Invasion of Hanover by Prussian troops leading to it being annexed, ultimately, into the German Empire
