= Sigismund von Löw =

German army officer (1757–1846)

- Born: 7 November 1757; Staden, Florstadt
- Died: 16 July 1846 (aged 88); Offenbach am Main
- Military career
- Allegiance: Electorate of Hanover; United Kingdom; Kingdom of Hanover
- Branch: Hanoverian Army; British Army
- Service years: 1774–1817
- Rank: General
- Unit: King's German Legion
- Commands: 7th Line Battalion, KGL; 4th Line Battalion, KGL; KGL Brigade, 1st division
- Conflicts: French Revolutionary Wars; Peninsular War

General Freiherr Sigismund Christoph Gustav von Löw von und zu Steinfurth (7 November 1757 – 16 July 1846) was a Hanoverian army officer who served in the Hanoverian and British armies and fought in the French Revolutionary and Napoleonic Wars.

== Early life and Hanoverian service ==
Born on 7 November 1757, von Löw was the youngest child of Johann Freiherr von Löw von und zu Steinfurth, Lord Chamberlain of Hanover and his wife Sophie Freiin Marie Margarethe Diede Zu Fürstenstein. He joined the Hanoverian Foot Guards as an Ensign on 1 April 1774, and served there for the next twenty-eight years, being promoted to Captain on 8 December 1787.

Captain von Löw first saw active service with his regiment in Flanders during the War of the First Coalition in 1793. He fought at the battle of Famars and at the siege of Valenciennes. He was promoted to Major on 15 August the following year. After the Peace of Basel in 1795, von Löw's regiment returned to Hanover and spent the next seven years at peace. He was promoted to brevet Lieutenant Colonel on 8 December 1802.

== British service ==
Following the French dissolution of Hanover, von Löw was one of the many soldiers who fled to Britain to form the King's German Legion. Joining this body on 21 January 1806, he was given command of the 7th Line Infantry battalion and promoted to Colonel (this promotion being back-dated to 20 December 1804). He led this battalion at Copenhagen in 1807 and on Sir John Moore's abortive mission to Sweden in 1808.

Still under Moore's overall command, von Löw was part of the force which landed in Maceira Bay, Portugal on 25 August 1808. His battalion was chosen to form part of the garrison of Lisbon. In March 1809 they became part of General Sir John Murray's KGL brigade, participated in the Oporto campaign but did not fight in the battle.

On 18 June 1809, von Löw was promoted to Brigadier General and placed in command of the brigade. The previous commander, Brigadier General von Drieburg, had returned to Britain to recover his health, and von Löw was the senior Colonel in the Legion. His first chance to lead them in combat was at the battle of Talavera, where they were badly mauled following an ill-timed charge across the Portina stream. In August, following the death of General Langwerth, he was given command of a new KGL brigade, the largest in Wellington's army. He led this force at Bussaco, Fuentes de Oñoro, Ciudad Rodrigo, Salamanca and Burgos.

By this time, von Löw's health had broken down and Wellington arranged for him to be recalled to Britain. He wrote to the General saying:

I wish you to believe that I am very sensible, and that I will always remember with pleasure your services that you have rendered to this army; and that wherever you may go, you will have my wishes for your success and good health.

General von Löw relinquished command of the brigade on 6 May 1813 and left for Britain. He was not actively employed by the British Army again.

== Return to Hanover ==
Returning to Hanover after the war, von Löw was made a Major General in 1816, a Lieutenant General in 1817 and a General in 1838 (though he was pensioned from the Hanoverian Army in 1817). He died in Offenbach am Main on 16 July 1846 (aged 88).
