= King's German Legion =

British Army formation (1803–1816)

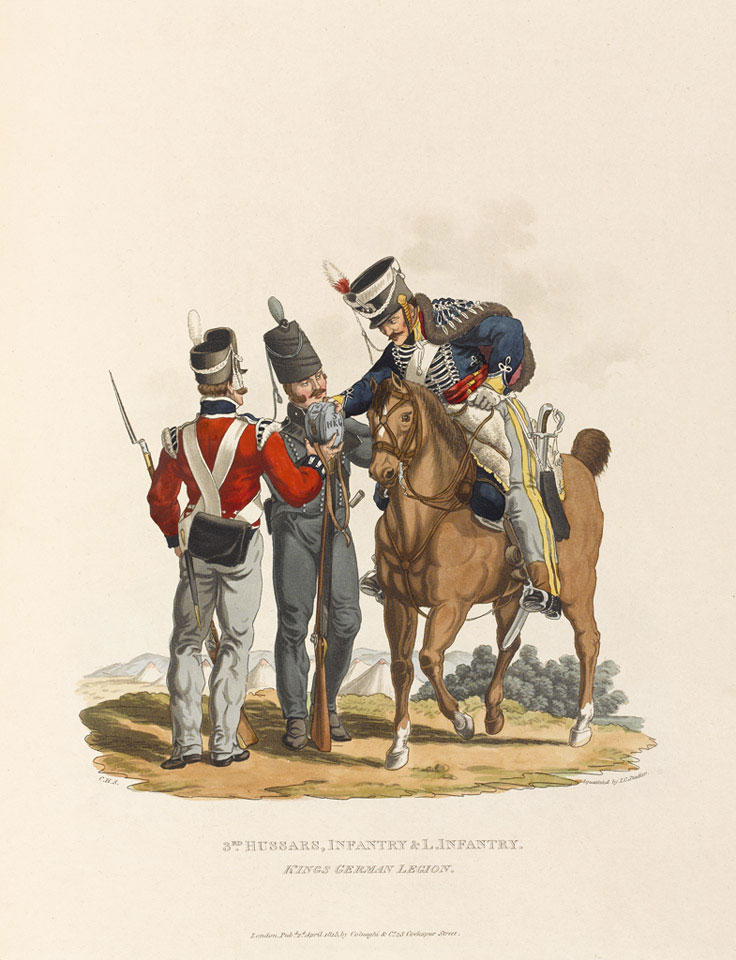
- 1815 engraving of a KGL line infantryman, light infantryman and hussar
- Active: 1803–1816
- Countries: United Kingdom
- Branch: British Army
- Type: Artillery; Cavalry; Line infantry; Light infantry
- Size: Approximately 14,000
- Garrison/HQ: Infantry: Bexhill-on-Sea; Cavalry: Weymouth, Dorset
- Battle honours: Peninsular War; Waterloo; Battle of Venta del Pozo (1st and 2nd Light Infantry Battalion); Garcia Hernandez (1st Regiment of Dragoons ); Bodon (1st Regiment of Hussars); Barrosa (2nd Regiment of Hussars); Göhrde (3rd Regiment of Hussars)

Commanders
- Notable commanders: Charles, Count Alten; Henry de Hinuber

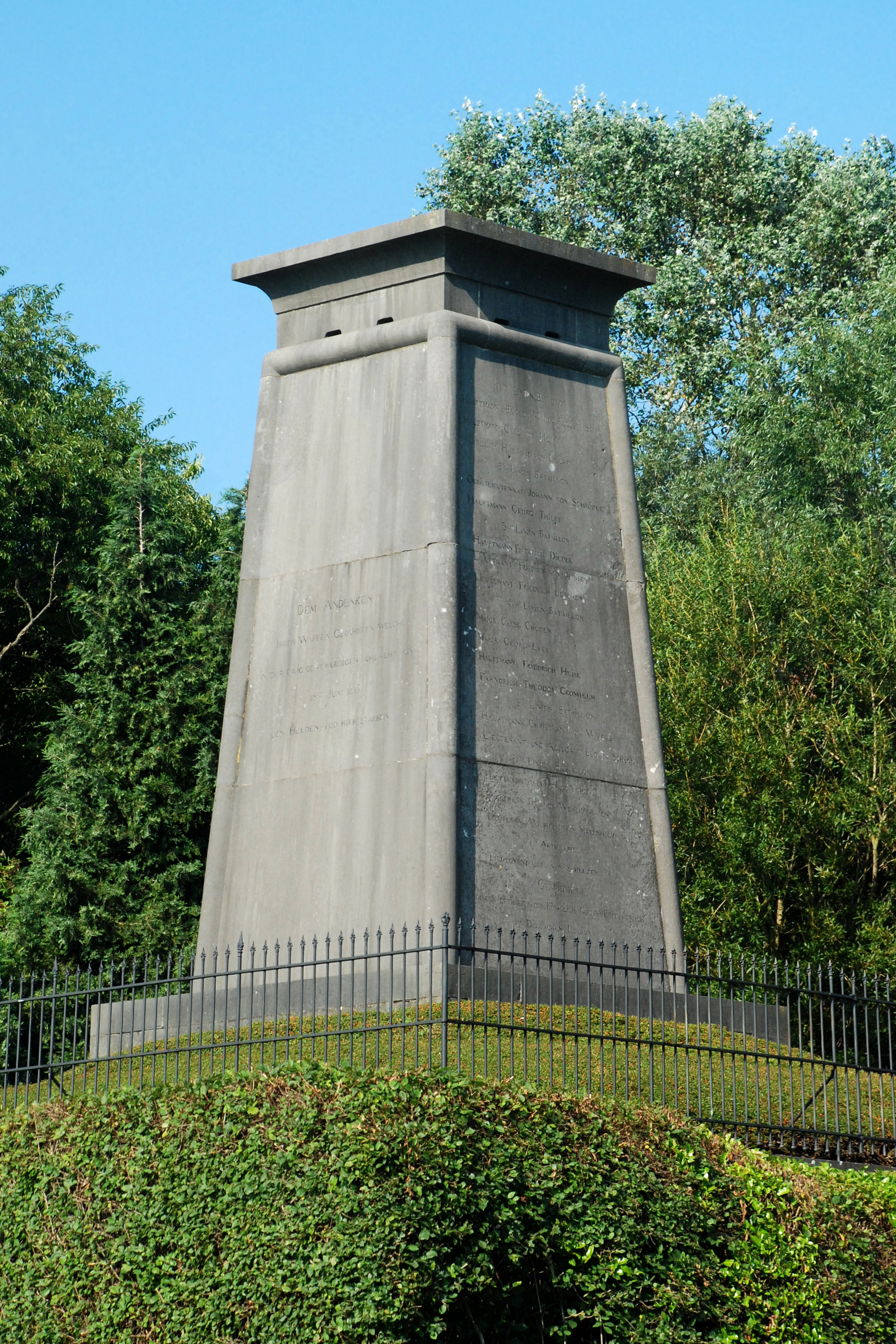
Monument to the Hanoverians in Waterloo (1818)

The King's German Legion (KGL; German: Des Königs Deutsche Legion) was a formation of the British Army during the French Revolutionary and Napoleonic Wars. Consisting primarily of expatriate Germans, it existed from 1803 to 1816 and achieved the distinction of being the only German military force to fight without interruption against the French and their allies during the Napoleonic Wars.

Formed within months of the French dissolution of the Electorate of Hanover in 1803, the KGL was constituted as a combined arms corps by the end of the year. Although it never fought autonomously and remained a part of the British army for the duration of the Napoleonic Wars, the KGL played a vital role in several campaigns, most notably the Peninsular War, Walcheren Campaign and Hundred Days.

The KGL was disbanded in 1816, and many of its units were incorporated into the Royal Hanoverian Army, which later became part of the Imperial German Army after the unification of Germany into the German Empire 1871. The British German Legion, raised during the Crimean War, has sometimes been erroneously referred to as the "King's German Legion".

== History ==
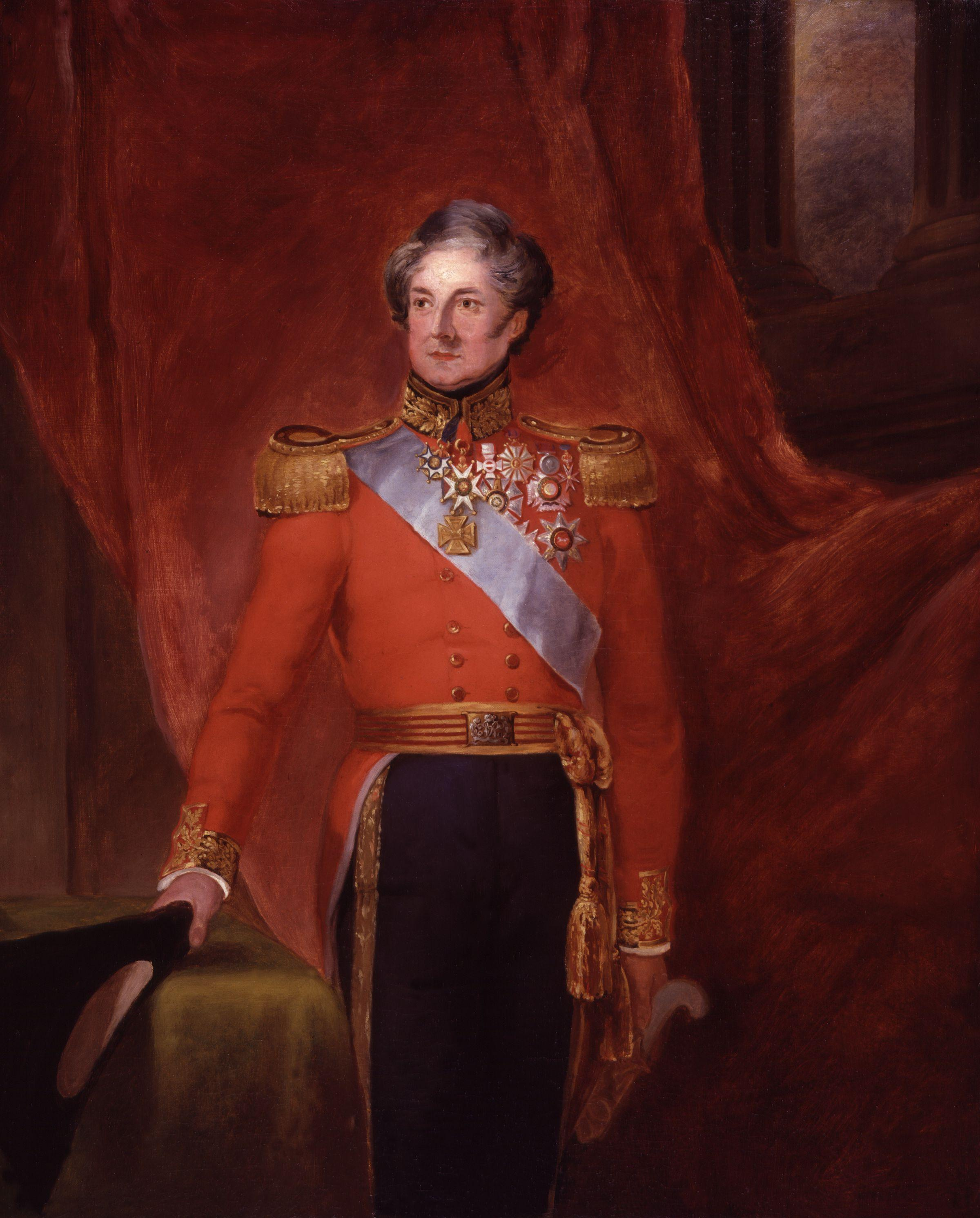
Colin Halkett helped to raise the King's German Legion.

After the occupation of Hanover by Napoleonic troops the Convention of Artlenburg, also called the Convention of the Elbe, was signed on 5 July 1803 and formally dissolved the Electorate of Hanover. Consequently, the Elector's army was disbanded. Many former Hanoverian officers and soldiers fled the French occupation of Hanover to Britain; George III, the deposed Elector of Hanover, was also King of the United Kingdom.

The same year, Major Colin Halkett and Colonel Johann Friedrich von der Decken were issued warrants to raise a corps of light infantry, to be named The King's German Regiment. On 19 December 1803, Halkett's and von der Decken's levies were combined as a basis of a mixed corps (includes all arms: mounted, infantry, artillery) renamed the King's German Legion. The KGL infantry were quartered in Bexhill-on-Sea and the cavalry in Weymouth, Dorset. On 22 July 1806, several KGL units were involved in a street fight in Tullamore, Ireland with Irish militiamen in the so-called Battle of Tullamore.

The number of officers and other ranks grew over time to approximately 14,000, but during the 13 years of its existence, close to 28,000 men served in the legion at one time or another. Initially, most of the officers were appointed with temporary rank, but in 1812 all the officers of the legion were given permanent rank in the British Army for "having so frequently distinguished themselves against the enemy". It saw active service as an integral part of the British Army from 1805 to 1816, after which its units were disbanded. In November 1813 Hanover was liberated from French rule and the Hanoverian Army revived. At the Battle of Waterloo in 1815 two distinct Hanoverian forces – the KGL and the Hanoverian Army – served under the Duke of Wellington.

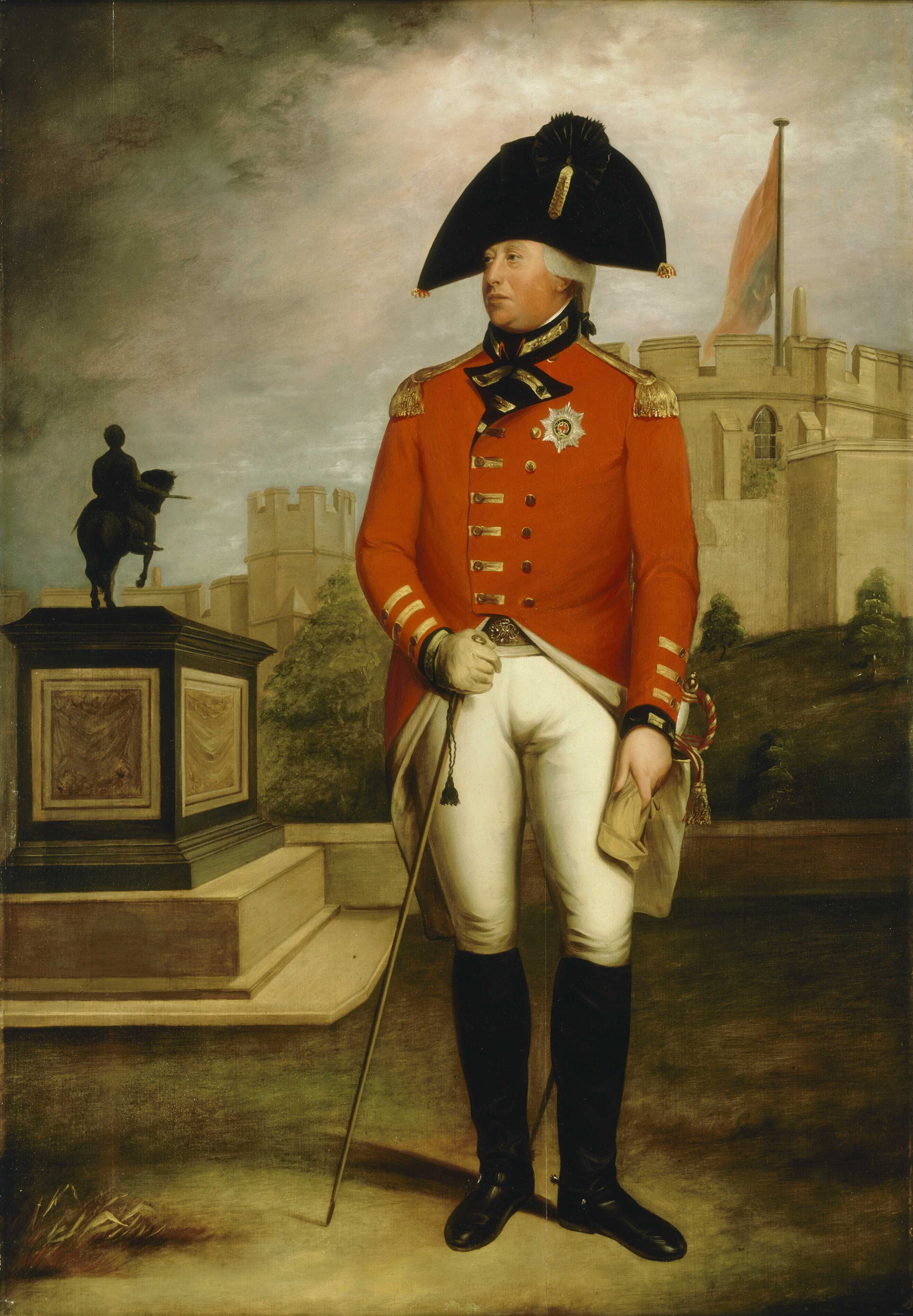
The King referenced by the unit's name: George III, King of the United Kingdom and Elector of Hanover

== Organisation ==
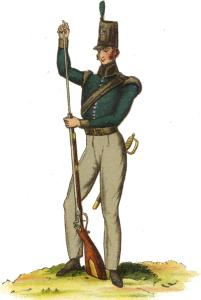
Private from the 1st Light Battalion

=== Cavalry ===
- 1st Regiment of Dragoons (1804–1812, red jacket)
  - changed into: 1st Regiment of Light Dragoons (1812–1816, blue jacket)
- 2nd Regiment of Dragoons (1805–1812, red jacket)
  - changed into: 2nd Regiment of Light Dragoons (1812–1816, blue jacket)
- 1st Regiment of Hussars
- 2nd Regiment of Hussars
- 3rd Regiment of Hussars

=== Infantry ===
- 1st Light Infantry Battalion
- 2nd Light Infantry Battalion
- 1st Line Battalion
- 2nd Line Battalion
- 3rd Line Battalion
- 4th Line Battalion
- 5th Line Battalion
- 6th Line Battalion
- 7th Line Battalion
- 8th Line Battalion

=== Artillery and engineers ===
- King's German Artillery
  - 2 horse batteries
  - 4 foot batteries
- King's German Engineers

== Campaigns ==
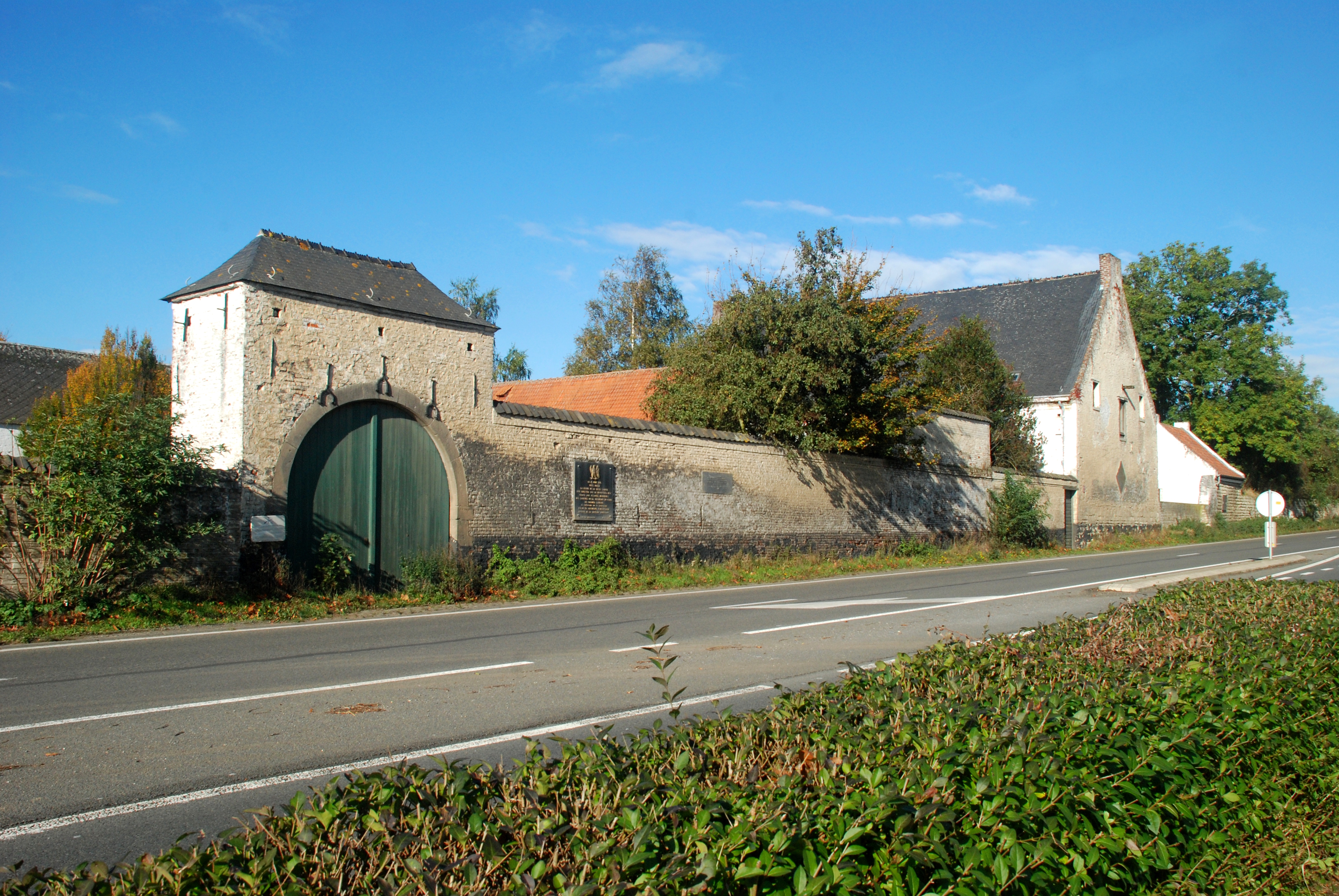
La Haye Sainte, which the KGL defended at Waterloo

Although the legion never fought autonomously or as a single unit, its units participated in campaigns in Hanover, Pomerania, Copenhagen and Walcheren, the Peninsular War under General John Moore; and the retreat to Corunna; the Peninsular War under the Duke of Wellington, including the battles of Bussaco, Barrosa, Fuentes de Oñoro, Albuera, Ciudad Rodrigo, Salamanca, García Hernández, Burgos, Venta del Pozo, Vitoria, San Sebastián, Nivelle, Orthez, Sicily, and the eastern parts of Spain, Northern Germany and Göhrde.

In the Peninsular Campaign, the Germans enhanced the veteran core of the British army. At Sabugal, in April 1811, several hundred German hussars augmented the Light Division, and the hussars found the proper ford of the Côa river. At García Hernández, KGL dragoons performed the unusual feat of smashing two French square formations in a matter of minutes.

At the Battle of Waterloo, the 2nd Light Battalion – with members of the 1st Light Battalion and the 5th Line Battalion – defended the farmhouse and road at La Haye Sainte. As the 5th Line Battalion under Colonel Christian Friedrich Wilhelm von Ompteda was on its way to reinforce the defenders of Haye Sainte, the French cavalry attached to Jean-Baptiste Drouet, Comte d'Erlon's Corp I rode them down; only a few of the intended relievers survived. After a six-hour defence, without ammunition, or reinforcements, the Germans were forced to abandon the farm, leaving the buildings in shambles and their dead behind.

== Legacy ==
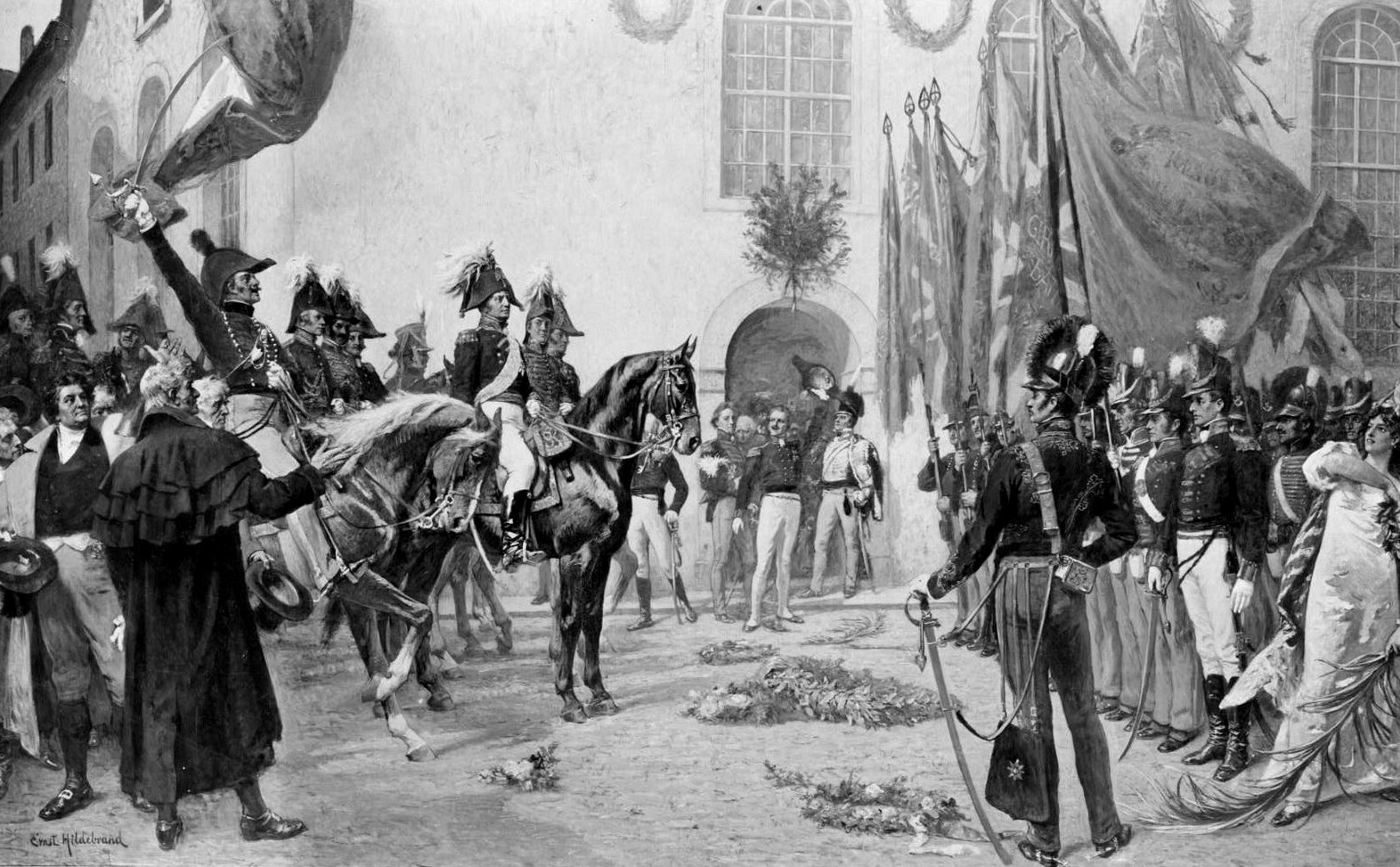
Ernst Hildebrand painting depicting the KGL's return to Hanover

The legion was known for its excellent discipline and fighting ability. The cavalry was reputed to be among the best in the British army. According to the historian Alessandro Barbero, the King's German Legion "had such a high degree of professionalism that it was considered equal in every way to the best British units." After the victory at Waterloo, the Electorate of Hanover was re-founded as the Kingdom of Hanover. However, the Army of Hanover had been reconstituted even before the final battle, so that there were two Hanoverian armies in existence including at the Battle of Waterloo. In 1816 the legion was dissolved and some officers and men were integrated into the new Hanoverian army.

== Battle honours ==
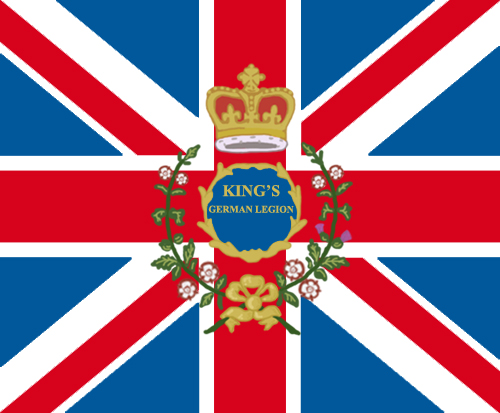
Infantry battalion Colours of the KGL

- Peninsular War
- Waterloo
- Battle of Venta del Pozo (1st and 2nd Light Infantry Battalion)
- García Hernández (near Salamanca) (1st Regiment of Dragoons )
- El Bodón (1st Regiment of Hussars)
- Barrosa, near Cádiz, Spain (2nd Regiment of Hussars)
- Göhrde (3rd Regiment of Hussars)

== Regimental colonels ==
The following officers served as colonels of the regiment or colonels commandant to KGL units:

The King's German Legion

- 1803–1816: Prince Adolphus, Duke of Cambridge

1st Light Dragoons

- 1804–1813: Eberhardt Otto George von Bock
- 1813–1815: John, Count Walmoden Gimborn
- 1815–1816: Wilhelm von Dörnberg

2nd Light Dragoons

- 1806–1810: Otto, Baron Schulte
- 1810–1814: Claus, Baron Decken
- 1814–1816: Johann August, Baron Veltheim

1st Hussars

- 1804–1816: Charles, Baron Linsingen

2nd Hussars

- 1804–1816: Victor, Baron Alten

3rd Hussars

- 1804–1810: John, Baron Reden
- 1810–1814: Johann August, Baron Veltheim
- 1814–1816: Frederick de Arentsschildt

1st Light Battalion

- 1804–1816: Charles, Count Alten

2nd Light Battalion

- 1803–1816: Colin Halkett

1st Line Battalion

- 1803–1816: Prince Adolphus, Duke of Cambridge

2nd Line Battalion

- 1804–1816: Adolphus, Baron Barsse

3rd Line Battalion

- 1805–1816: Henry de Hinuber

4th Line Battalion

- 1804–1809: Ernest, Baron Langwerth
- 1809–1816: Sigismund von Löw

5th Line Battalion

- 1804–1810: George de Drieberg
- 1810–1813: George Klingsohr
- 1813–1815: Christian Friedrich Wilhelm von Ompteda
- 1815–1816: Louis, Baron Bussche

6th Line Battalion

- 1804–1816: Augustus Honstedt

7th Line Battalion

- 1806–1816: Frederick, Baron Drechsel

8th Line Battalion

- 1804–1816: Peter du Plat

Foreign Veteran Battalion

- 1814–1816: Claus, Baron Decken

King's German Artillery

- 1803–1816: Friedrich von der Decken

== Memorials ==
- Plaques on the outside wall of La Haye Sainte
- Monument opposite La Haye Sainte commemorating the dead of the KGL
- Hanover – the Waterloo Column
- Hanover – a statue of Carl von Alten stands in front of the archives near the Waterloo Plaza that surrounds the Waterloo Column
- Hanover – also near the archives is a plaque commemorating Major Georg Baring
- Hanover – the Legionsbrücke (lit. 'Legion's Bridge') crossing the river Ihme was originally named Waterloobrücke (lit. 'Waterloo Bridge'), but was renamed for the KGL in 1945
- Osnabrück – the Heger Tor, formally called Waterloo-Tor (lit. 'Waterloo Gate') commemorating the officers and soldiers of the KGL
- Commemorative stone at Wittingen, Lower Saxony with inscription Des Königs Deutsche Legion 1803–1815 – Peninsula, Waterloo, Göhrde
- On the Gehrdener mountain is a stone commemorating Carl Ludewig von Holle, fallen in Waterloo
- On the monument for the Battle of Vittoria is a plaque for the KGL
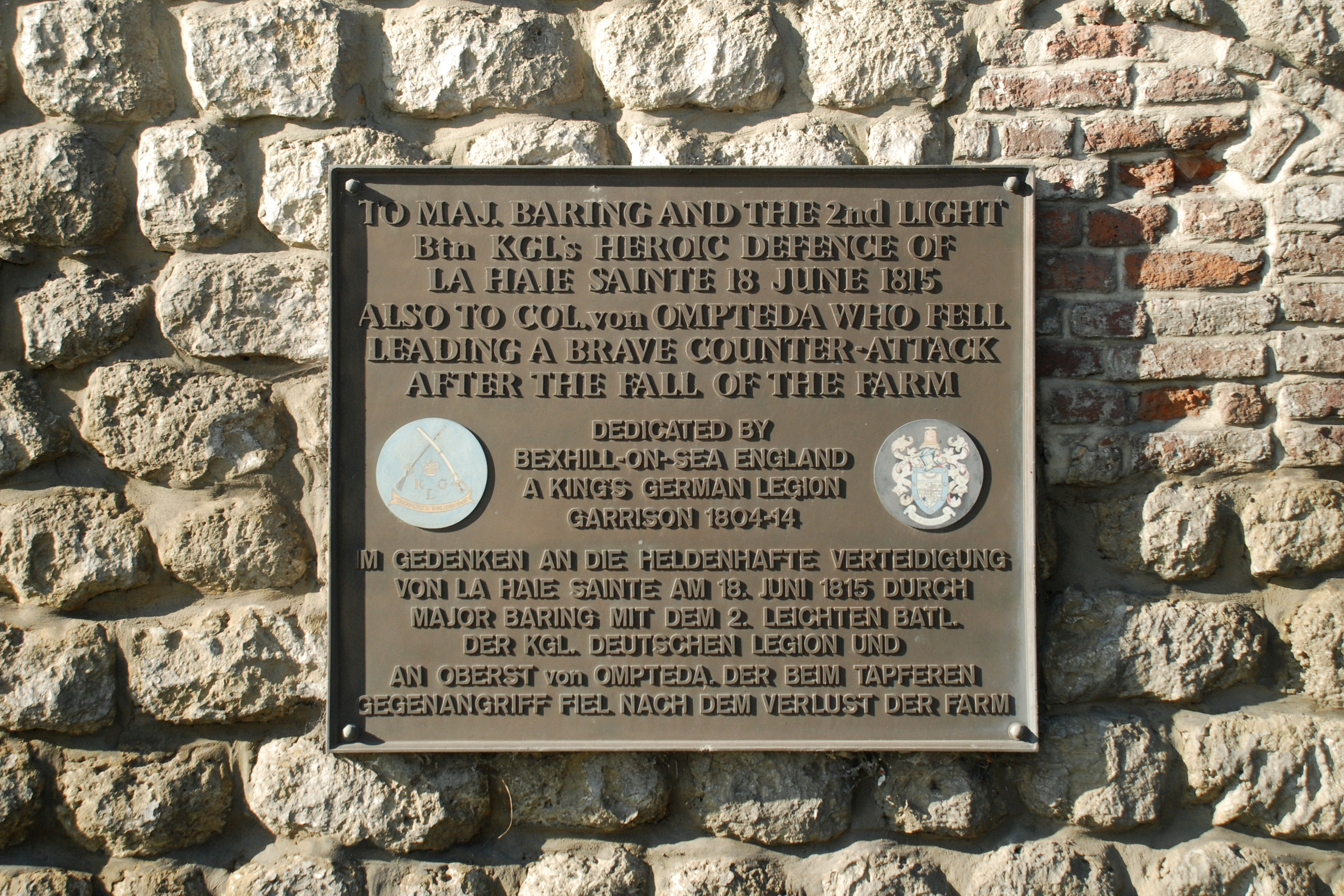
Plaque on the outside wall of La Haye Sainte

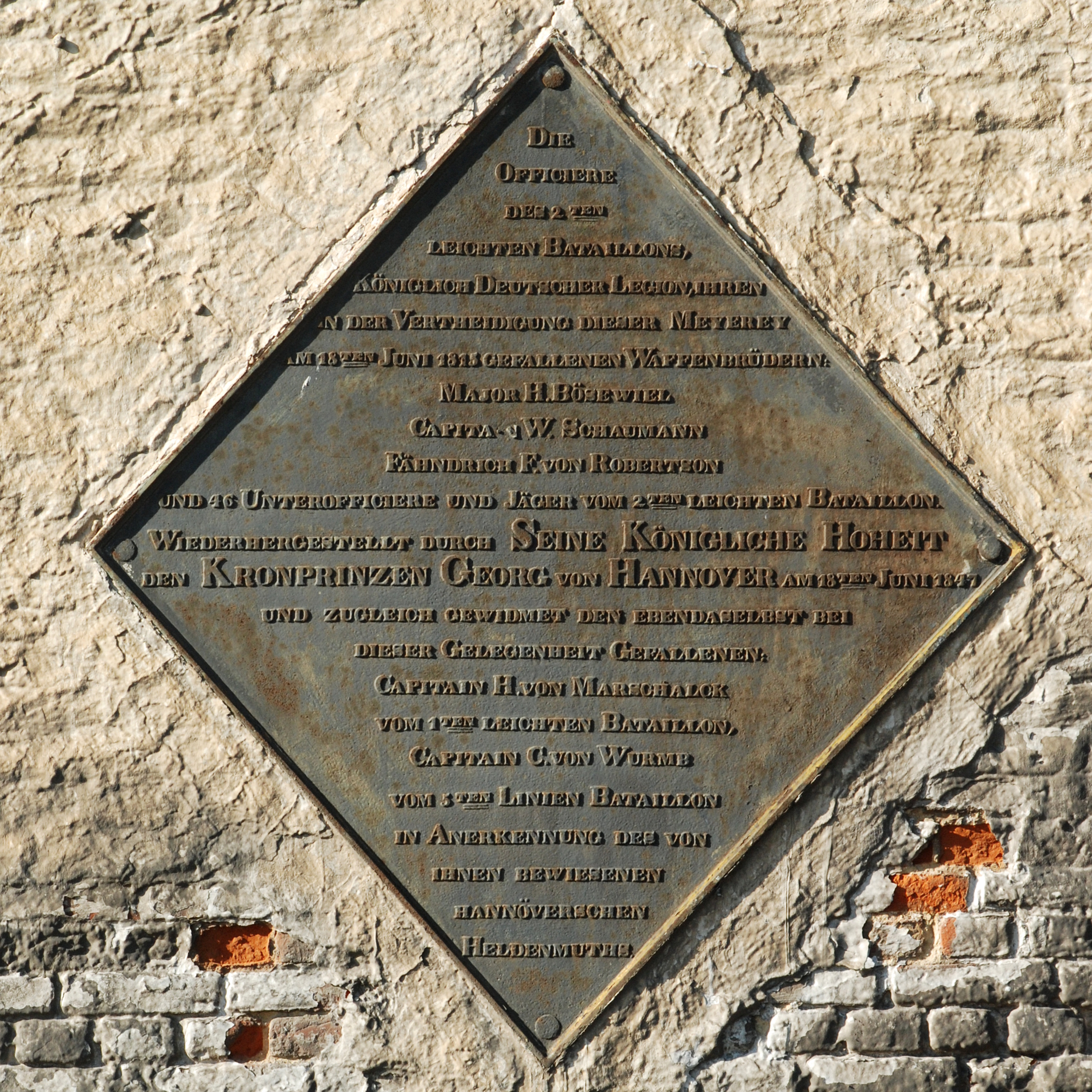
Second plaque on the wall of La Haye Sainte

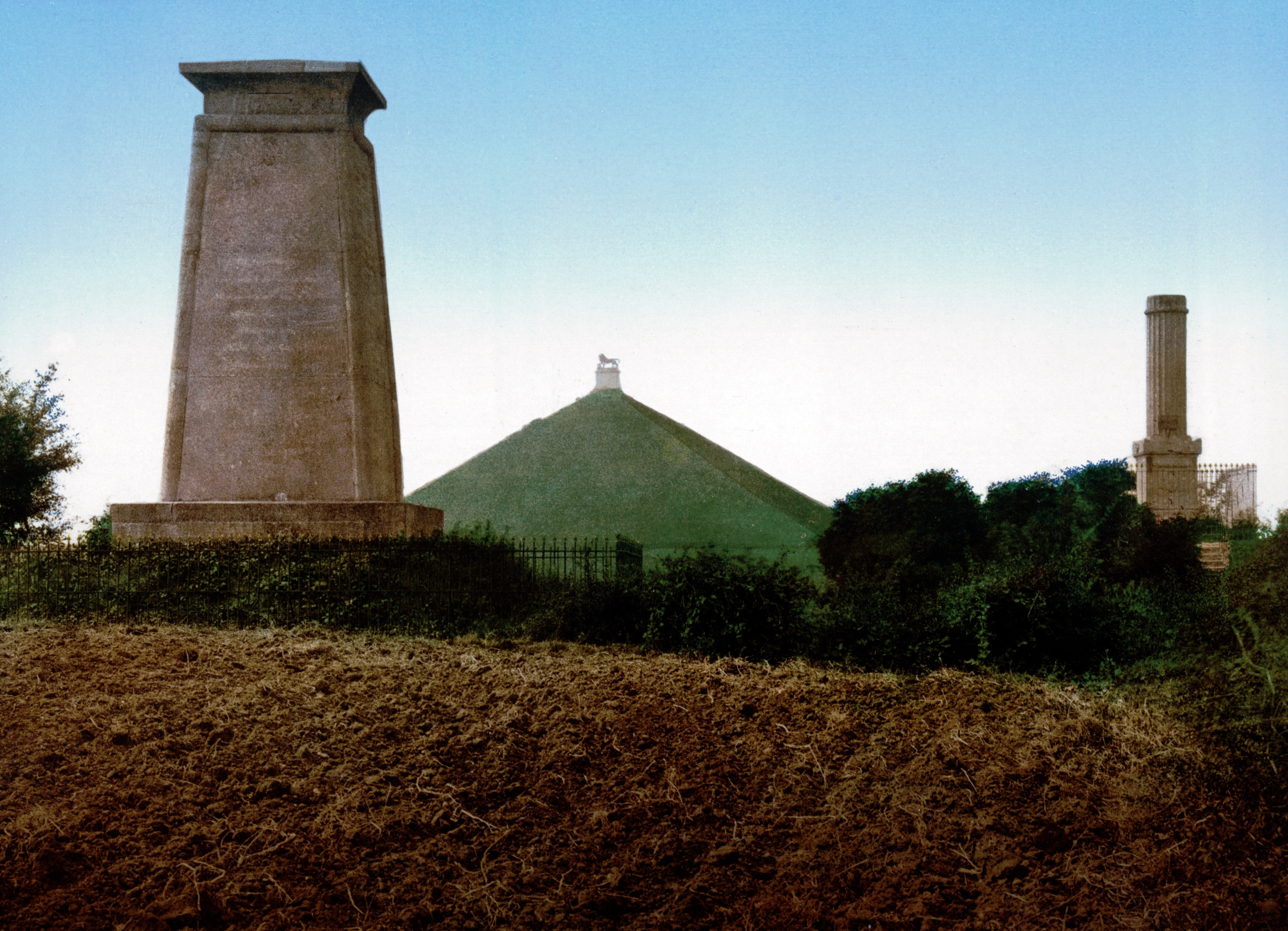
Monuments next to La Haye Sainte – the one on the left is for the KGL

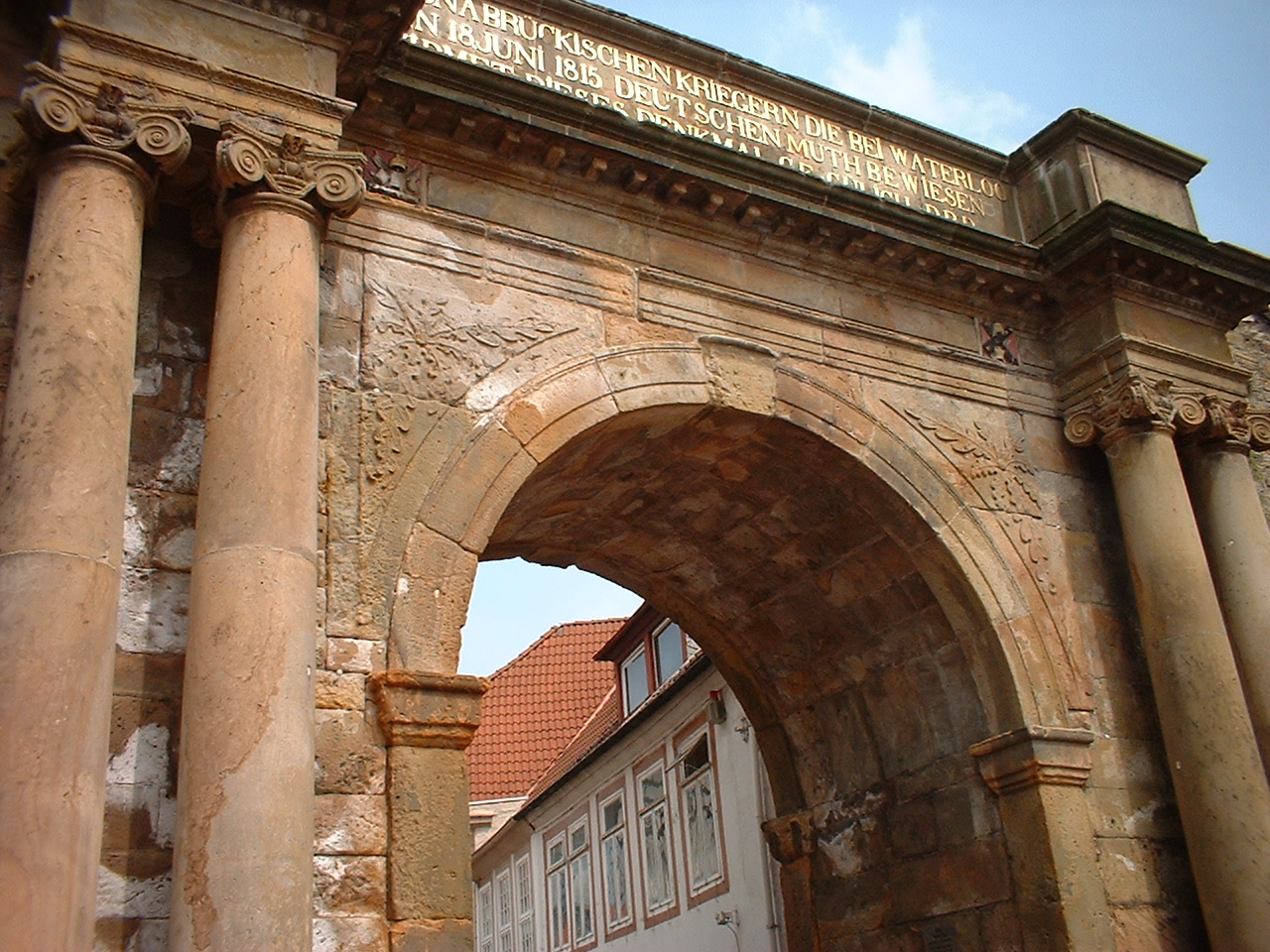
The Heger Tor in Osnabrück, formally called Waterloo-Tor for the KGL

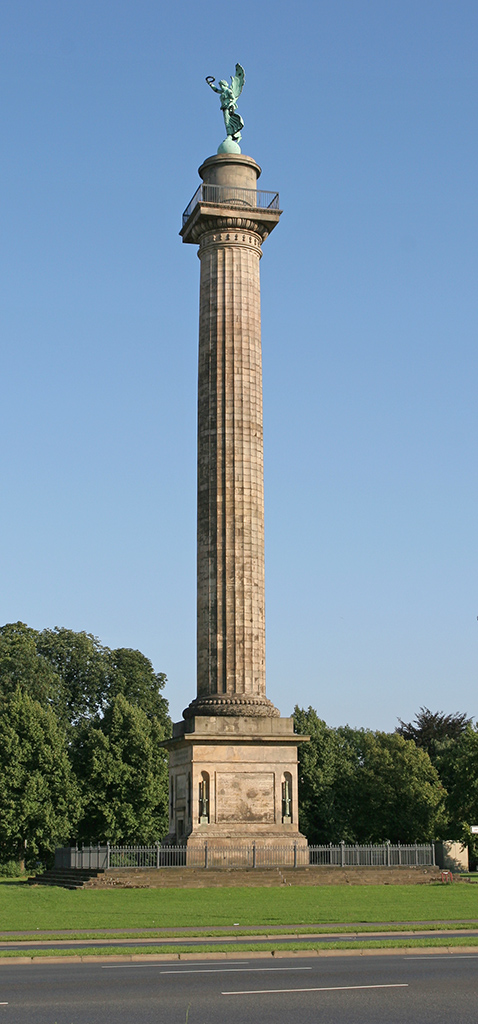
Waterloo Column in Hanover

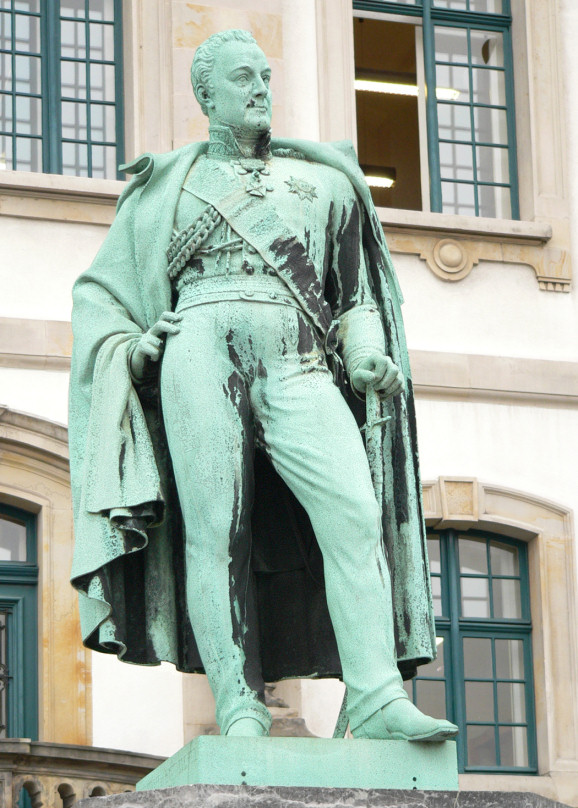
Statue of Charles Alten in Hanover, Germany by sculptor Heinrich Kümmel

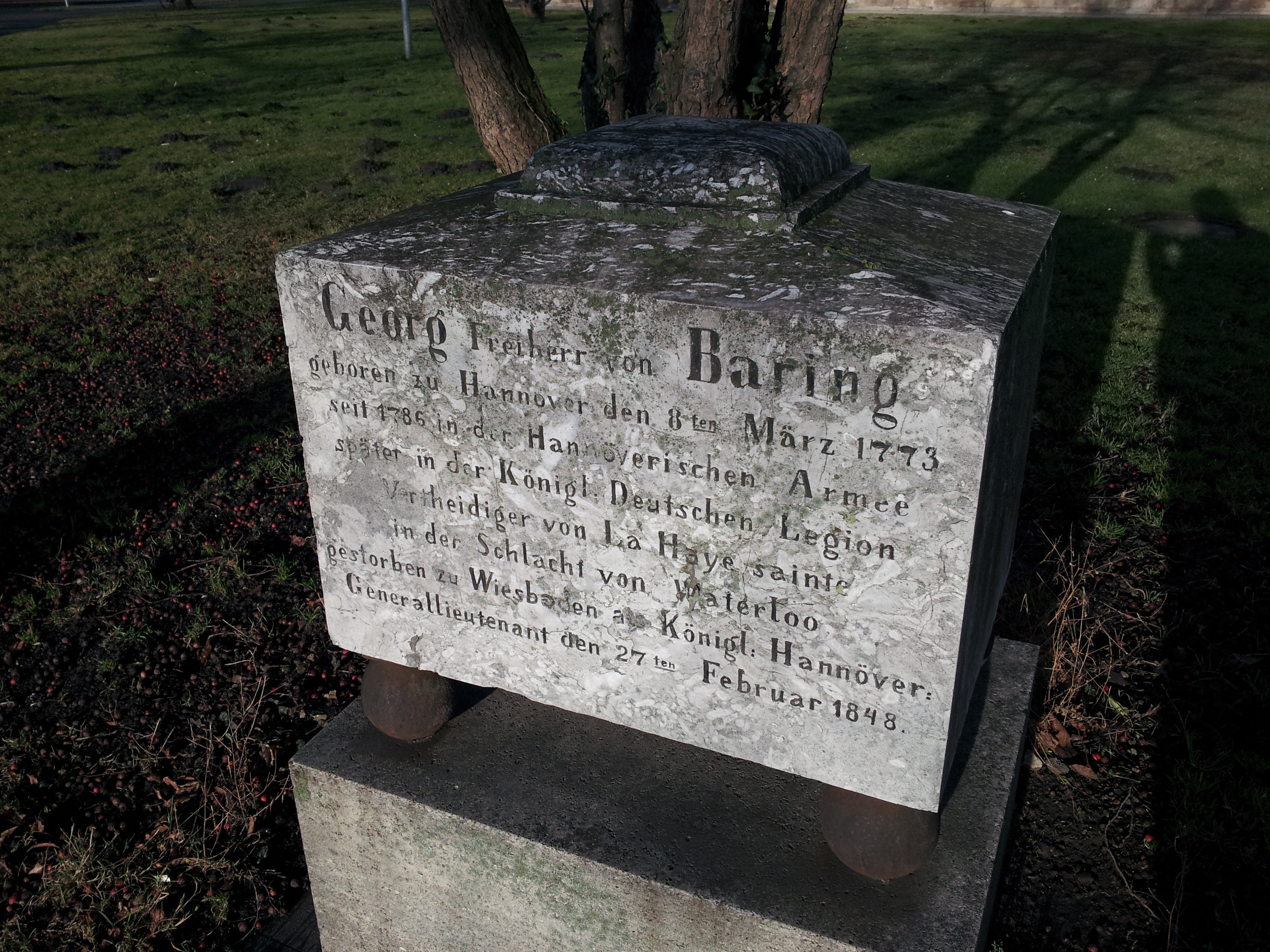
Plaque to Georg Baring in Hanover

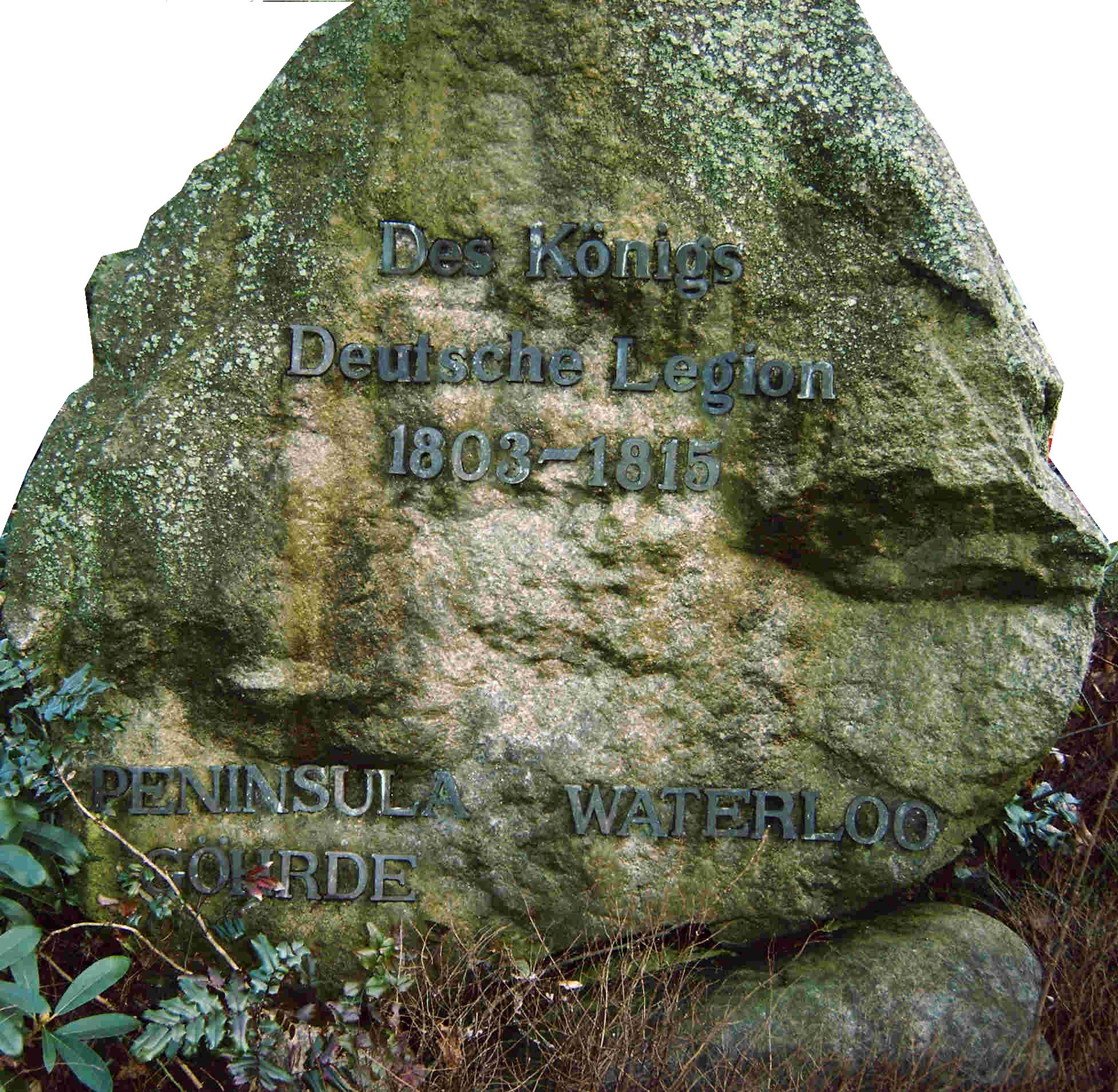
Stone in Wittingen, Lower Saxony

== German army ==
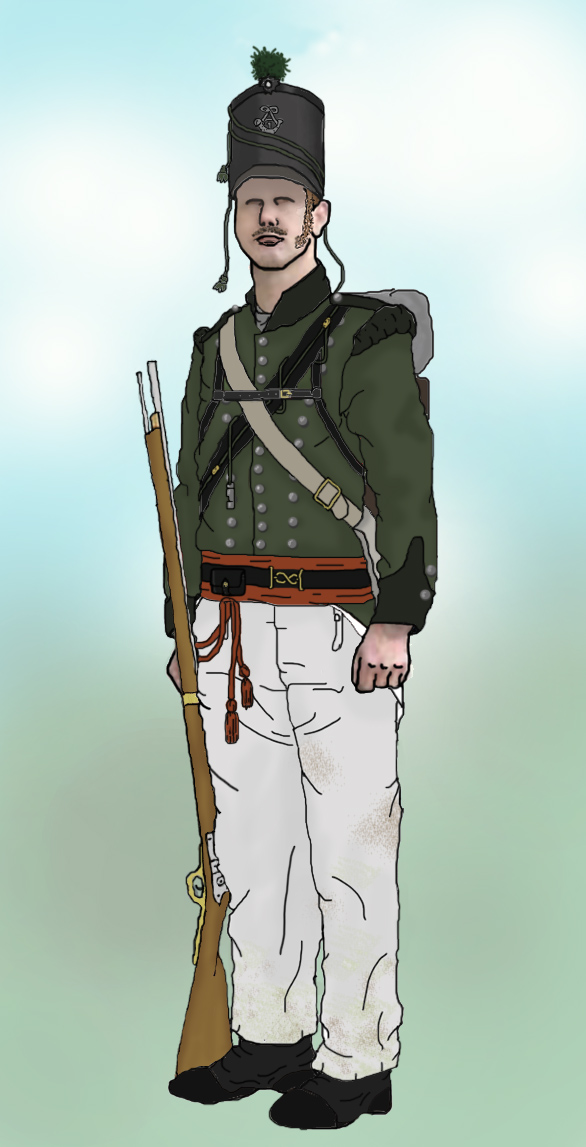
A Sergeant, 2nd Btn. KGL, Waterloo (1815)

After the unification of Germany, some of the old KGL units that had served in the Hanoverian Army were perpetuated in the Imperial German Army, which eventually led to their serving in the Reichswehr and the Wehrmacht. These were:

- Kavallerie-Regiment 13–1st Regiment of Light Dragoons
- Kavallerie-Regiment 13–2nd Regiment of Light Dragoons
- Kavallerie-Regiment 14–1st Regiment of Hussars
- Infanterie-Regiment 16–1st Line Battalion
- Infanterie-Regiment 17–1st Light Battalion

== See also ==
- British military history
- Russian–German Legion
- Portuguese Legion (Napoleonic Wars)

== Sources ==
- Adkin, Mark (2001). The Waterloo Companion. London: Aurum Press. ISBN 1-85410-764-X. OL 3646086M.
- Barbero, Alessandro (2005). The Battle of Waterloo. Walker and Company. ISBN 0-8027-1453-6.
- Beamish, North Ludlow (1997a) [1832]. History of the King's German Legion. Vol. 1, Reprint. Naval & Military Press. ISBN 0-9522011-0-0.
- Beamish, North Ludlow (1997b) [1837]. History of the King's German Legion. Vol. 2, Reprint. Naval & Military Press. ISBN 0-9522011-0-0. OL 23440828M.
- Chappell, Mike (2000a). The King's German Legion (1) 1803–1812. Botley, Oxford: Osprey Publishing. ISBN 1-85532-996-4.
- McGrigor, Mary (2005). Wellington's Spies. Barnsley: Pen and Sword Books. ISBN 1-84415-328-2.
- "The Battle of Tullamore – Offaly History". 1 September 2007. Archived from the original on 16 September 2016.
- Pfannkuche, Adolf (1926). Die Königlich Deutsche Legion 1803–1816 (in German) (2 ed.). Hannover: Helwingsche Verlagsbuchhandlung. OCLC 35452961.
- Smith, Digby (1998). The Napoleonic Wars Data Book. London: Greenhill. ISBN 1-85367-276-9.
- Urban, Mark (2004). Wellington's Rifles: Six Years with England's Legendary Sharpshooters. Bloomsbury Publishing USA. ISBN 0-8027-1437-4.
- "War Office". The London Gazette. No. 16635. 18 August 1812. pp. 1643–1644.
