= Waterloo-Tor =

War Memorial in Osnabrück, Germany

Coordinates: 52.2763°N 8.0388°E

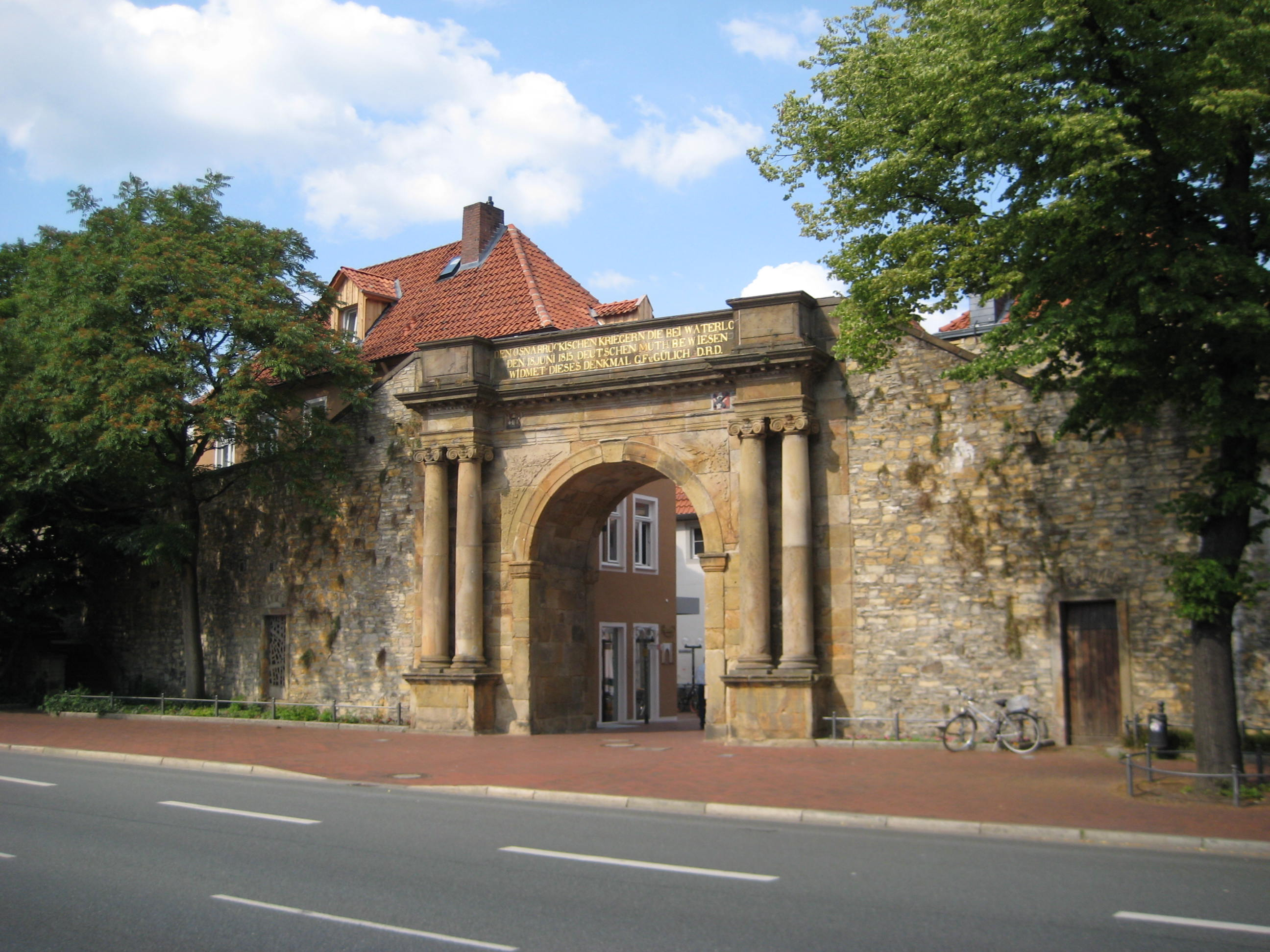
Waterloo-Tor (Waterloo Gate) at Heger Tor

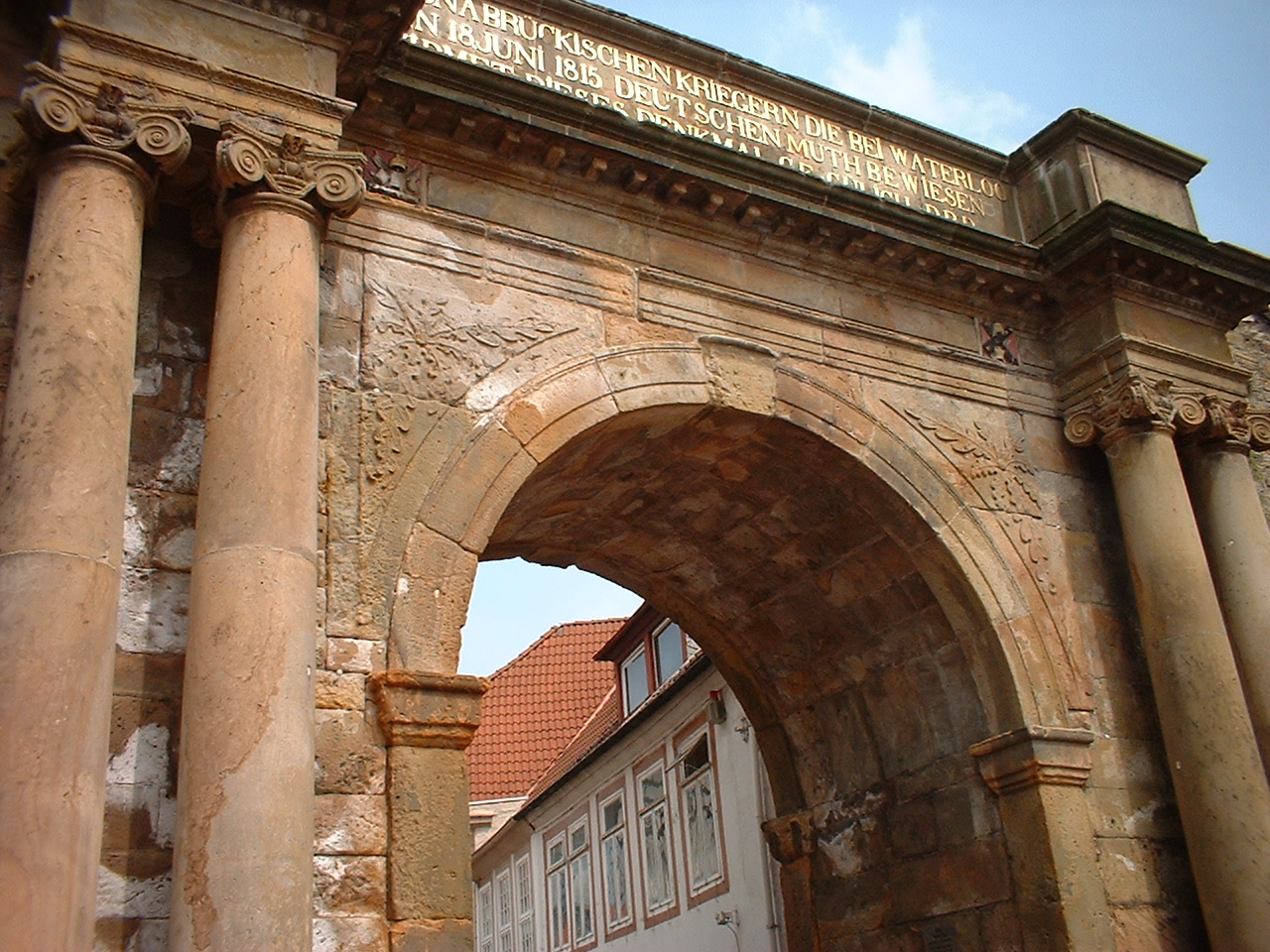
Close-up view

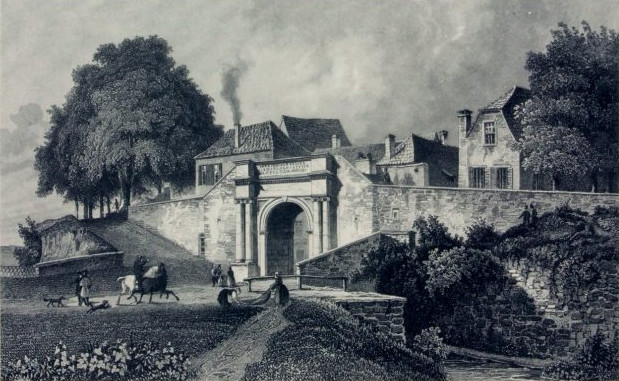
“Das Waterloothor zu Osnabrück”, steel engraving (1850)

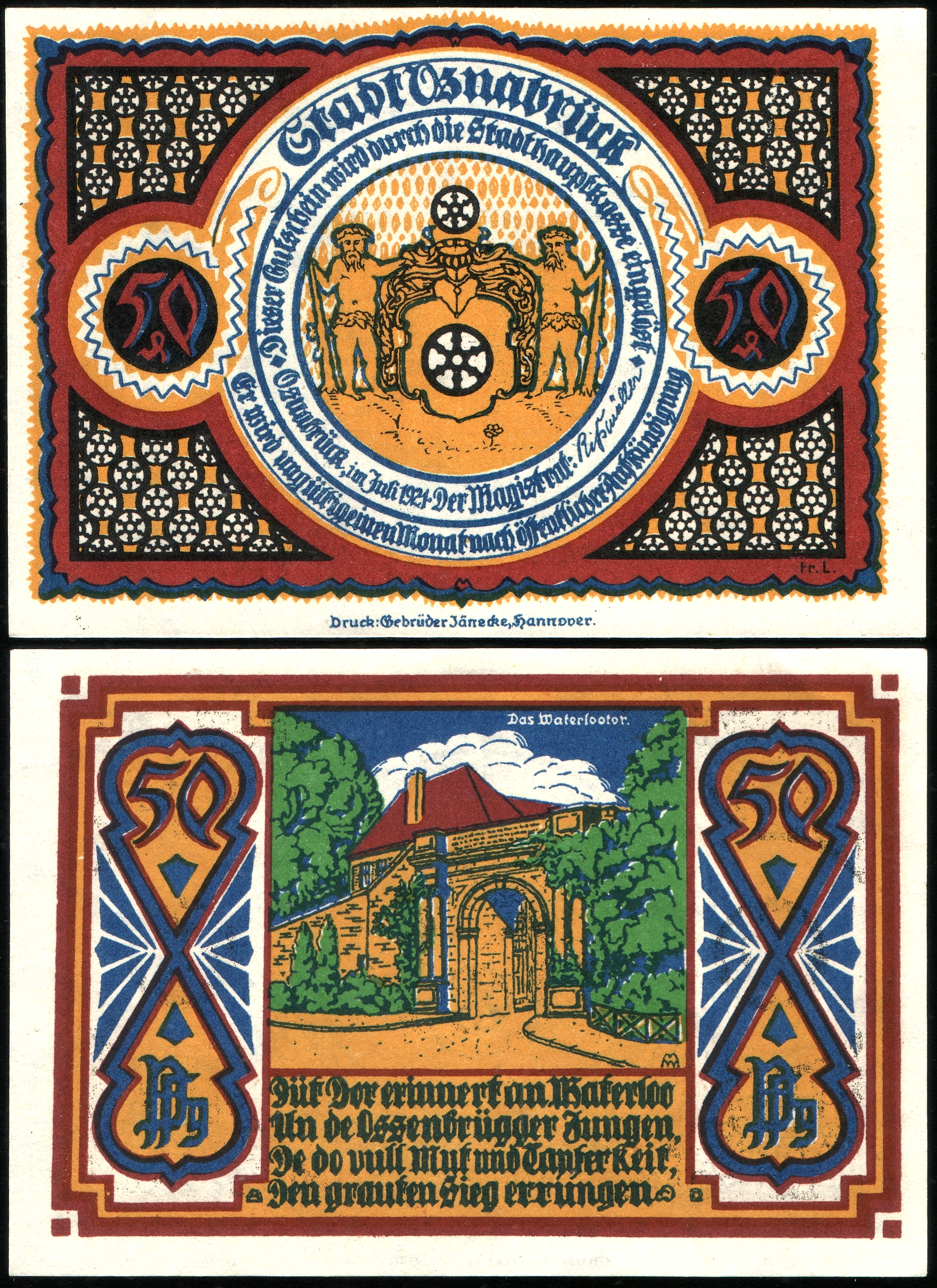
The "Waterlootor" on a "Notgeld" banknote (1921)

Waterloo-Tor (English: Waterloo Gate) is a war memorial in Osnabrück, Germany, commemorating the Battle of Waterloo. Along with its surrounding area the Waterloo-Tor is usually referred to as “Heger Tor” by residents of Osnabrück; the name “Waterloo-Tor” is barely used by locals.

== History ==
A large number of soldiers from Osnabrück fought at the Battle of Waterloo on 18 June 1815 under British high command, as part of the city’s territorial army regiments, its light field battalion or the King’s German Legion. In 1816 a local resident, Gerhard Friedrich von Gülich, had donated 1,000 thalers to set up a memorial honouring his fellow citizens who had fought.

The Waterloo-Tor was designed by Johann Christian Sieckmann (1787–1861) at the behest of Gülich; it was built along the Heger Tor wall in 1817.

Its appearance resembles that of both a triumphal arch and a fortification, as parts of the Heger Tor – the city’s historic fortification which had been knocked down in 1815 – were integrated into its design; namely the parts belonging to the tower, gate, bastion, compound and also the passage leading from the Altstadt (old town) to the Heger Laischaft area situated just outside of the city.

During the medieval period, the actual Heger Tor had been situated further out from the city; roughly 20 metres to the west of today’s Waterloo-Tor. This can be seen in the fact that the still-existent Akzisehaus (excise house) – which used to be located directly in front of the city gate – is now situated on the other side of the Wallring. Nevertheless, the old name “Heger Tor” continued to be used by locals to refer to the new Waterloo-Tor.

== Description ==
Waterloo-Tor is a triumphal arch built in the style of the Arch of Titus in Rome.

Additionally elements of other classical gate constructions of the time – such as the Brandenburg Gate in Berlin – were included.

The archway is framed on both sides by coupled ionic pillars on plinths and stylobates. The architrave bears an inscription in gold capital letters: „Den Osnabrückischen Kriegern die bei Waterloo / den 18. Juni 1815 deutschen Muth bewiesen / widmet dieses Denkmal G.F.v.Gülich D.R.D.“ (The fighters of Osnabrück who at Waterloo / on 18 June 1815 displayed German courage / are honoured by this memorial from G.F. v.Gülich D.R.D. – “D.R.D.” standing for “Der Rechte Doktor” (Doctor by Law); Gülich was a Doctor of Law).

The gate’s platform is accessible by means of ramps on the sides of the wall or a flight of steps, allowing good views over the medieval Altstadt to the east; to the west lie the Kulturgeschichtliches Museum (Cultural History Museum), the Felix-Nussbaum-Haus art gallery, the Akzisehaus and the Stüve memorial and Stüve-Haus, which today acts as the local Volkshochschule (adult education centre).

For centuries carts and carriages used to run through the old and new “Heger Tor” towards Münster and Holland, or arriving here from the west. In 1957 vehicular passage through the gate was stopped and it was converted to a pedestrian zone. Today the so-called “Heger-Tor-Viertel” (Heger Tor Quarter) is situated behind the Heger Tor; it is well known for its rustic restaurants and has become popular as a meeting point for day and night-time visitors. An old chestnut tree positioned on the Heger Tor platform was uprooted during a storm in November 1957. Trees which were planted there afterwards were finally removed during renovation of the gate in 2013.

The Waterloo-Tor’s façade – visible only from the outer side by the ringroad – helps give the structure a dual character, depending on which side the gate is observed from: from the Altstadt side it appears to be simply an unadorned city gate from the time of the old Heger Tor, a medieval fortification. From the other side it is distinctly recognisable as a heroes’ memorial. The gate can also be looked at as a passage between two urban worlds – the noisy, modern new town running along the Heger Tor wall on the outside, and the tranquil, traffic-calmed Altstadt on the inside.
