= Portrait of the Duke of Cumberland =

Painting by George Dawe

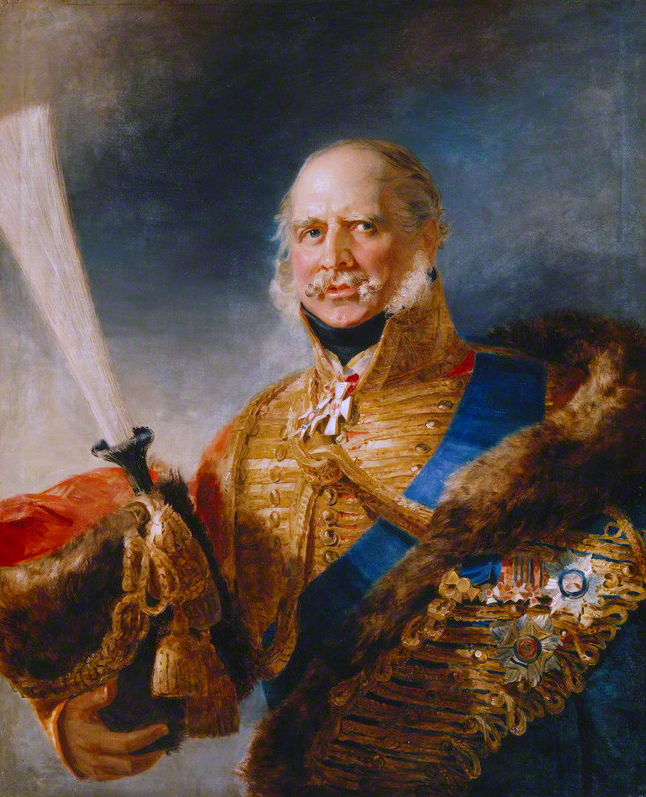
- Artist: George Dawe
- Year: c.1828
- Type: Oil on canvas, portrait
- Dimensions: 94 cm × 76 cm (37 in × 30 in)
- Location: National Portrait Gallery, London

Portrait of the Duke of Cumberland is an 1828 portrait painting by the English artist George Dawe depicting Ernest Augustus, Duke of Cumberland. The younger brother of the British monarchs George IV and William IV, he became King of Hanover in 1837.

== History and description ==
The fifth son of George III, Cumberland spent much of his youth in military service during the Napoleonic Wars and was present at the Liberation of Hanover in 1813. He should not be confused with his great uncle William, Duke of Cumberland known for his defeat of the 1745 Jacobite rising who was also depicted in numerous works of art. When his niece Queen Victoria succeeded to the British crown in 1837, Cumberland inherited the Hanoverian throne as the Guelphic tradition of Salic Law acknowledged him as the nearest male claimant.

Dawe was a fashionable British portrait painter who had spent a number of years in Saint Petersburg painting leading figures of the Russian Empire. He returned to England and died in 1829. His style has been compared to Sir Thomas Lawrence, the leading British portraitist and President of the Royal Academy. Dawe shows Cumberland in the uniform of a general of hussars and wearing multiple orders and decorations including the Order of the Garter, Order of the Bath and the Prussian Red Eagle.

Today the painting is in the collection of the National Portrait Gallery in London, having been acquired in 1946.

== Bibliography ==
- Bird, Anthony. The Damnable Duke of Cumberland: A Character Study and Vindication of Ernest Augustus, Duke of Cumberland and King of Hanover. Barrie & Rockliffe, 1966.
- Black, Jeremy. The Hanoverians: The History of a Dynasty. A&C Black, 2007.
- Nedd, Andrew M. History and Myth in Pictorial Narratives of the Russian 'Patriotic War', 1812-1914. Springer Nature, 2024.
- Priestley, John Boynton. The Prince of Pleasure and His Regency 1811-20. Sphere Books, 1971.
