= Liberation of Hanover =

Military campaign in 1813

The Liberation of Hanover took place in November 1813 as part of the War of the Sixth Coalition during the larger Napoleonic Wars. The Electorate of Hanover had been invaded and occupied in 1803 and since then had been divided between the First French Empire and the Kingdom of Westphalia ruled by Napoleon's younger brother Jerome. The historic House of Guelph headed by George III, but by 1813 under the control of the Prince Regent, were restored to their historic territories.

== Background ==
Hanover had been connected to Britain since the Hanoverian Succession of 1714 and its rulers had largely resided in London since then. After the 1803 annexation, many Hanoverian men had gone into exile to join the King's German Legion fighting with British forces. A brief Allied attempt to liberate Hanover in 1806 had been a failure. Britain continued to regard the restoration of Hanover as non-negotiable war objective. A French-raised Hanoverian Legion had been a failure as few inhabitants were willing to join the occupiers.

In 1812 following Napoleon's disastrous invasion of Russia, the tide turned against the French Empire and Britain which for many years had continued the war largely isolated, was joined by several European allies. The decisive Battle of Leipzig in October 1813 marked the end of Napoleon's dominance of Germany.

== Liberation ==
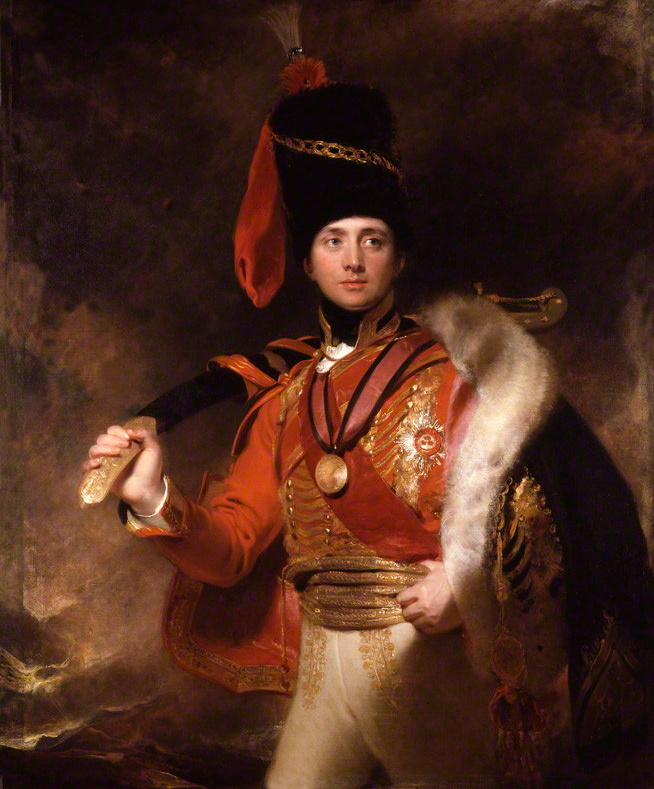
Portrait of Sir Charles Stewart by Thomas Lawrence. The Anglo-Irish diplomat and soldier Sir Charles Stewart represented Britain during the liberation.

The former Electorate was liberated by Allied troops under the overall command of Marshal Bernadotte of Sweden who was operating under a large subsidy from Britain. After Leipzig Sir Charles Stewart, the British envoy to Prussia and younger brother of the Foreign Secretary Lord Castlereagh was ordered to be on the spot.

The operation was concluded swiftly. The liberation provoked joyous scenes across Hanover, which had resented the French occupation and retained its loyalty to George III. Stewart reported "the enthusiasm, loyalty and unbounded joy of the people is not to be described". The news reached London at the same time as reports of a victory by Wellington at the Battle of Nivelle inside the borders of France.

On 19 December the King's fifth son Ernest Augustus entered Hanover to popular acclaim. Stewart observed "Here was a language that spoke from the hearts which I am quite unequal to describe, and there was a loyalty and devotion displayed which would have done honour to Britons". However he had no official role and his presence was a complication for Stewart and other British diplomats.

Bernadotte used Hanover as his base for further advances against the French although Britain and other Allies were concerned by his slow progress. The Allies crossed the Rhine in December 1813 and took part in the Invasion of France. In Hanover Count Munster was appointed Chief Minister. The Duke of Cambridge, George III's youngest son who had commanded Hanoverian troops during the failed attempt to defend Hanover in 1803, was made Viceroy.

== Aftermath ==
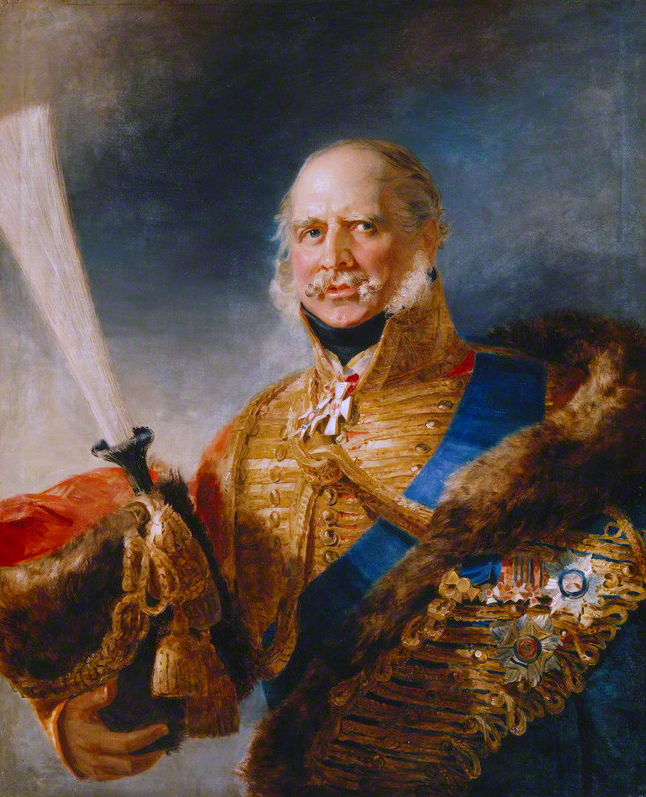
Portrait of the Duke of Cumberland by George Dawe. Cumberland took part in the liberation and in 1837 became King of Hanover.

The former Electorate was raised to the status of a Kingdom by the Congress of Vienna in 1814 joining the new German Confederation. As with Britain, a regency was established for the indisposed George III. The Hanoverian Army, defeated and scattered in 1803, was reformed and alongside the KGL took part in the final victory over Napoleon at the Battle of Waterloo in June 1815. The two forces were merged in 1816.

In 1821 Hanover's new monarch George IV visited Hanover for his coronation. The direct connection to Britain was severed in 1837, when George's younger brother Ernest Augustus became King and in 1866 the Kingdom was invaded and annexed by Prussia ending country's independence. It was incorporated into the new German Empire in 1871.

== Bibliography ==
- Grainger, John D. The Amiens Truce: Britain and Bonaparte, 1801-1803. Boydell Press, 2004.
- Payne, Reider. War and Diplomacy in the Napoleonic Era: Sir Charles Stewart, Castlereagh and the Balance of Power in Europe. Bloomsbury Publishing, 2021.
- Reid, William Hamilton. A Concise History of the Kingdom of Hanover from the Earliest Periods, to Its Restoration in 1813: and of the House of Brunswick. Orme, Edward, 1816.
- Simms, Brendan & Riotte, Torsten. The Hanoverian Dimension in British History, 1714–1837. Cambridge University Press, 2007.
- Smith, E.A. George IV. Yale University Press, 1999.
- Willis, Geoffrey Malden. Ernest Augustus, Duke of Cumberland and King of Hanover. A. Barker, 1954.
