= Invasion of Hanover (1803) =

French invasion of Hanover

- Part of the Napoleonic Wars
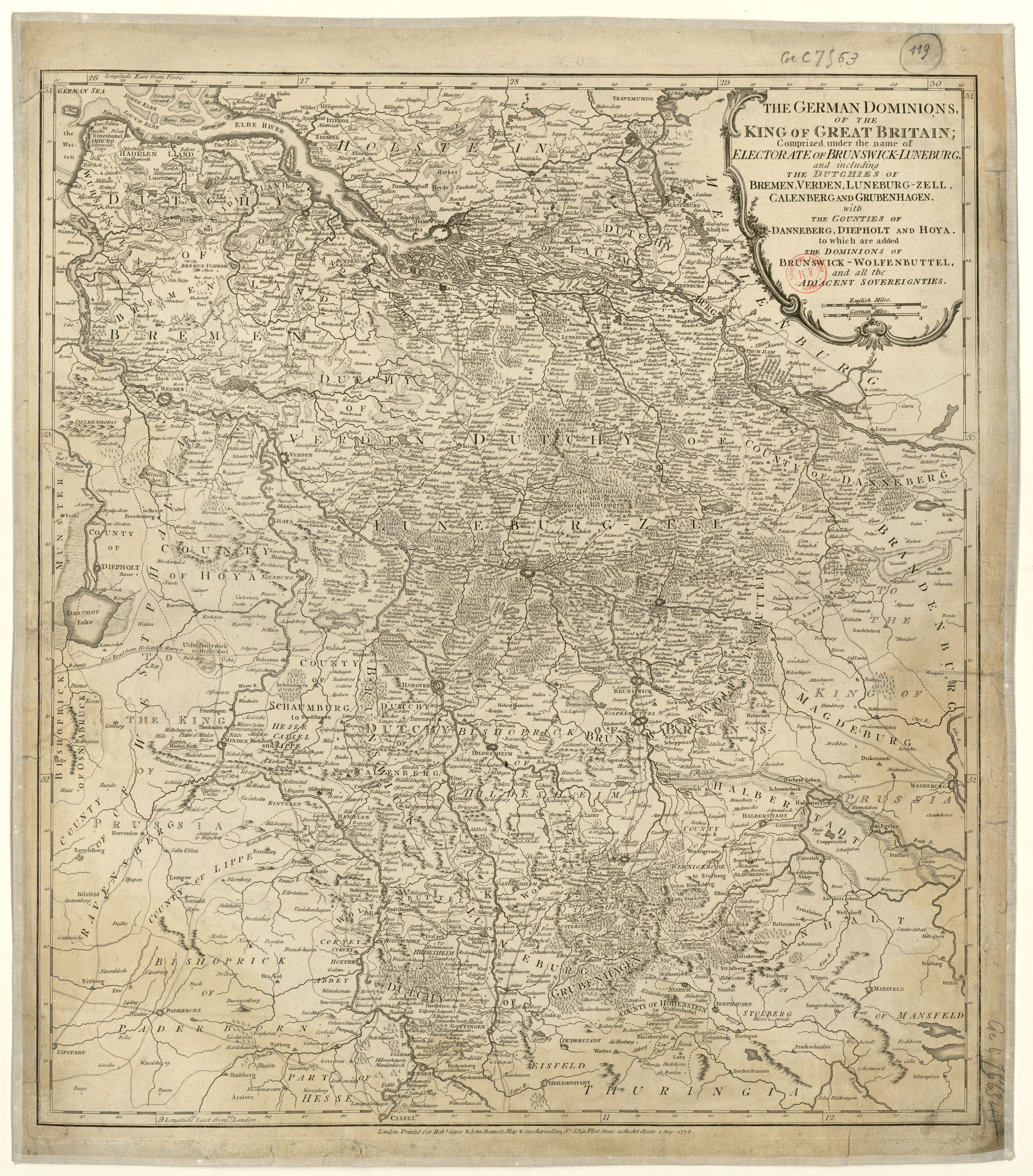
- Contemporary map of the German dominions of King George III in 1778.
Date	26 May – 5 June 1803
Location	Electorate of Hanover, Northern Germany.
Result	French victory: Convention of Artlenburg

Belligerents
France	Hanover

Commanders and leaders
(French First Republic) Édouard Mortier	(Electorate of Brunswick-Lüneburg) Duke of Cambridge; (Electorate of Brunswick-Lüneburg) Graf von Wallmoden (surrendered)

Strength
25,000	9,000

The Invasion of Hanover in 1803 during the Napoleonic Wars saw a French army under Édouard Mortier invade and occupy the Electorate of Hanover in Northern Germany following the breakdown of the Peace of Amiens. Hanover was under the rule of George III in a personal union with Britain, the principal enemy of Napoleon's French Empire. One consequence of the invasion was the formation of the exiled King's German Legion in British service. Hanover remained under French control until its liberation in 1813.

== Background ==
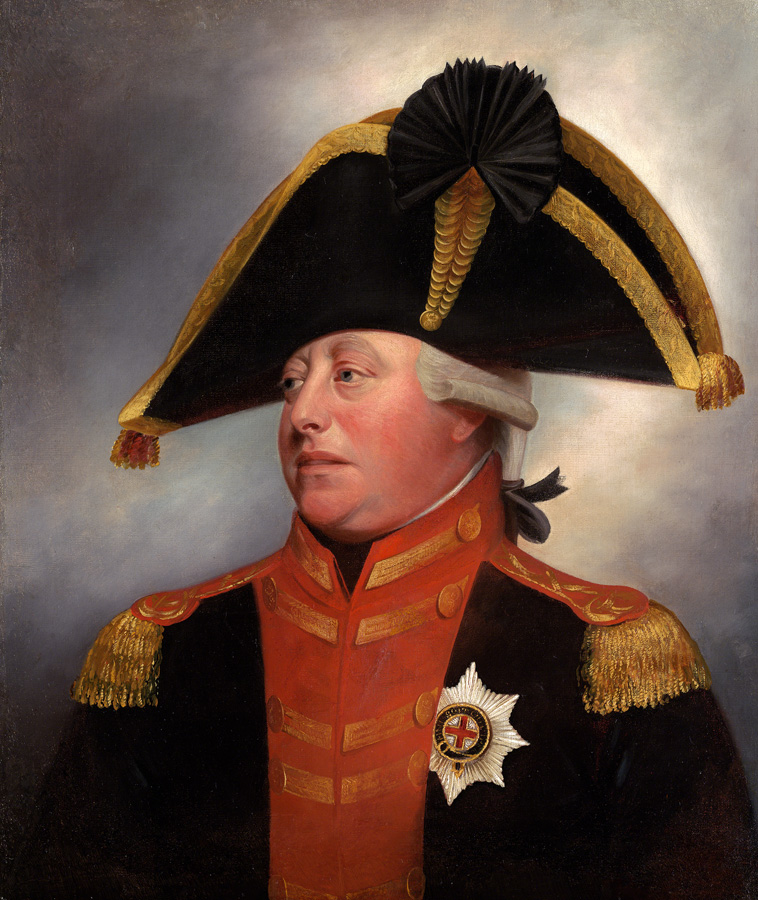
George III was both King of Britain and Elector of Hanover.

Since the 1714 Hanoverian Succession, Hanover and Britain had effectively functioned as a dual monarchy. Hanoverian troops fought alongside British forces in several 18th-century conflicts including the War of the Spanish Succession, War of the Austrian Succession, American War of Independence and French Revolutionary Wars. Hanover gave Britain a strong connection in Continental Europe, but in contrast to the islands Britain and Ireland, defended by the Royal Navy, it was vulnerable to invasion. Recognising that potential weakness, French forces made concerted attempts to defeat Hanover during the Seven Years' War, overrunning the Electorate in 1757 before being driven out by Ferdinand of Brunswick and repulsed at the Battles of Krefeld and Minden.

In 1801, Prussia had marched into Hanover during the League of Armed Neutrality and justified its operation not as an act of hostility but as an attempt to maintain the neutrality of Germany against the warring powers.

== Invasion ==
On 18 May 1803, war was declared between Britain and France. The renewal of the conflict led to Napoleon gathering a large army on the Channel coast of France, poised to attempt an invasion of Britain. Before an attempt on Britain, Napoleon switched his target to the more vulnerable Hanover, and 13,000 troops of the French Army under General Mortier moved against Hanover.

The Electorate was defended by the Hanoverian Army and locally raised militias under the Duke of Cambridge, George III's son, and Count Wallmoden. Resistance has been described as light or scant. On 4 June, French troops took the city of Hanover, the capital of the Electorate. On 5 June, the Convention of Artlenburg was signed by Wallmoden although George III refused to recognise it. It established French hegemony in the region. The only response that Britain made at the time was a blockade of the Elbe and the Weser Rivers by Royal Navy.

== Aftermath ==
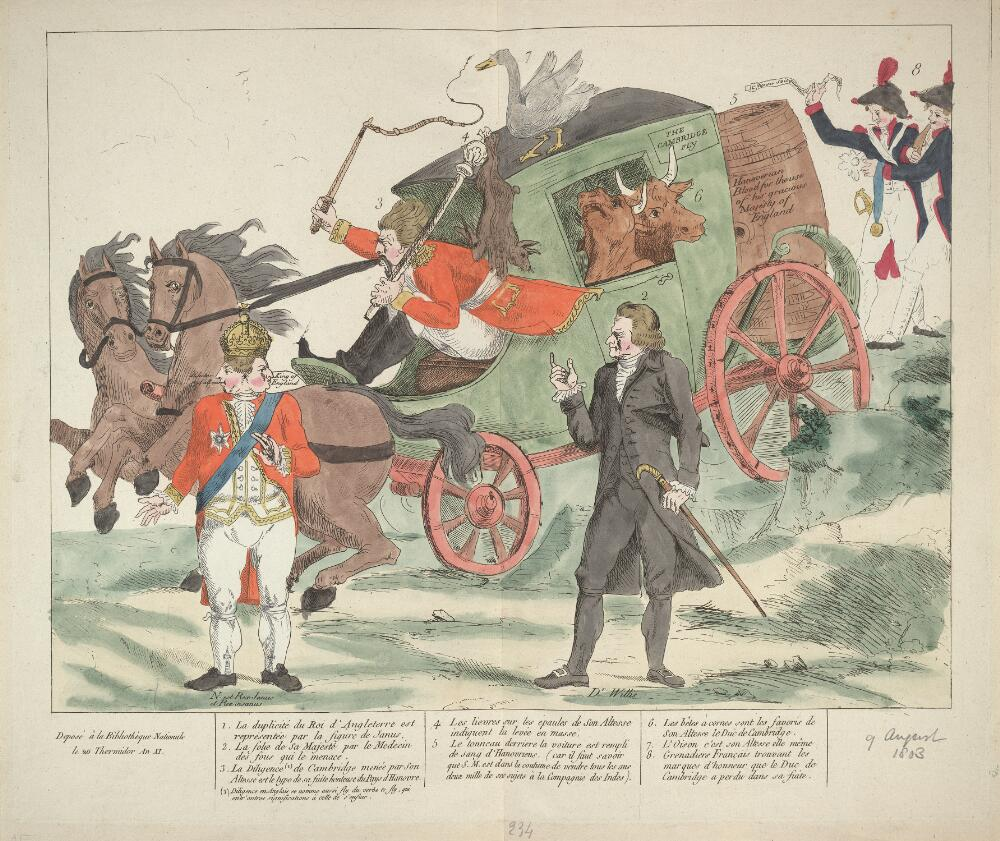
French cartoon mocking the flight of the Duke of Cambridge and the Hanoverian troops who soon formed the King's German Legion.

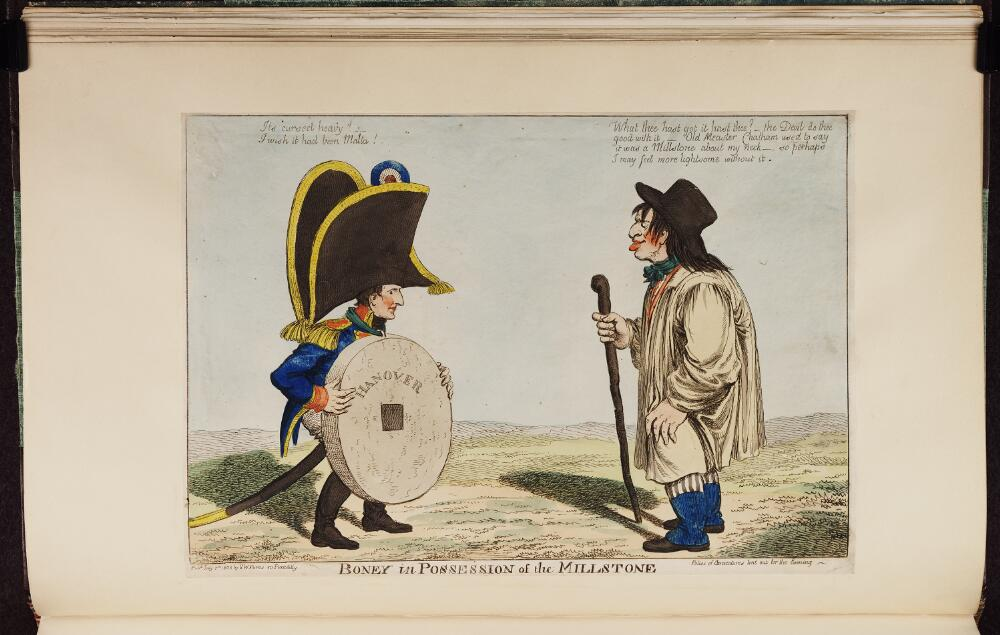
A British cartoon suggests that John Bull has been relieved of the weight of the millstone of Hanover by Napoleon. Nonetheless, British troops fought to recover Hanover from the French.

Many members of the Hanoverian Army fled abroad, and in December 1803, the King's German Legion was raised to enlist them in the Allied cause against Napoleon. They were joined in following years by other Hanoverians who left despite harsh punishments imposed by French authorities. Units from the KGL took part in many campaigns during the war, notably in the Peninsular War under the Duke of Wellington.

The French takeover of Hanover, which Prussia itself coveted, was one of the factors that drove Prussian King Frederick William III going to war against Napoleon in 1806, which to Prussia's own occupation and the loss of many of its territories at the Treaty of Tilsit in 1807. In support of Prussia, the British launched a failed expedition to Hanover in 1806.

Much of the territory of the electorate was subsequently incorporated into the Kingdom of Westphalia, ruled by Napoleon's younger brother Jérôme Bonaparte, with the northern area around Bremen becoming departments of France. France raised its own unit from the area, the Hanoverian Legion, although many of its recruits came from other parts of Europe.

In 1813, following the Allied victory at the Battle of Leipzig, Hanover was liberated from French domination. It was elevated to be the Kingdom of Hanover by the Congress of Vienna in 1814. Both the KGL and the newly reformed Hanoverian Army took part in the final defeat of Napoleon at the Battle of Waterloo.

== Bibliography ==
- Callister, Graeme. War, Public Opinion and Policy in Britain, France and the Netherlands, 1785–1815. Springer, 2017.
- Harding, Nick. Hanover and the British Empire, 1700–1837. Boydell & Brewer, 2007.
- Mcylnn, Frank. 1759: The Year Britain Became Master of the World. Random House, 2008.
- Roberts, Andrew. George III: The Life and Reign of Britain's Most Misunderstood Monarch. Penguin, 2021.
- Schneid, Frederick. Napoleon's Conquest of Europe: The War of the Third Coalition. Greenwood Publishing Group, 2005.
- Simms, Brendan. The Impact of Napoleon: Prussian High Politics, Foreign Policy and the Crisis of the Executive, 1797–1806. Cambridge University Press, 2002.
- Uffindell, Andrew & Corum Michael. On The Fields Of Glory: The Battlefields of the 1815 Campaign. Frontline Books, 2002.
- Zabecki, David T. Germany at War: 400 Years of Military History. ABC-CLIO, 2014.
