= Convention of Artlenburg =

1803 surrender of the Electorate of Hanover to Napoleonic France

The Convention of Artlenburg or Elbkonvention was the surrender of the Electorate of Hanover to Napoleon's army, signed at Artlenburg on 5 July 1803 by Oberbefehlshaber Johann Ludwig von Wallmoden-Gimborn. It disbanded the Electorate of Hanover and instigated its occupation by French troops.

== Context ==
After Napoleonic troops under lieutenant-general Édouard Adolphe Casimir Joseph Mortier occupied the electorate's capital at Hanover on 4 June 1803, the remaining Hanoverian troops withdrew to the north bank of the Elbe, into the Duchy of Saxe-Lauenburg, but were soon forced to surrender.

== Sources ==
- Hannover in Meyers Konversations-Lexikon, 4. Aufl. 1888–1890, Bd. 8, S. 136 f.
- Wording of the Convention of Artlenburg
