= Charles Best (British Army officer) =

British army officer (1765–1836)

Charles Best (also Carl Conrad Best; February 1765 in Hannover – 5 December 1836 in Verden) was a British army officer of Hanoverian descent who served in the armies of the East India Company, Britain and Hanover from 1781 until the end of the Napoleonic Wars.

== Biography ==
Best commenced his military career in 1781, as a cadet in the 2nd, or Duke of York's (Prince Frederick's) Hanoverian Regiment of Infantry Two Hanoverian regiments of foot being raised for the service of the East India Company, styled the 14th and 15th regiments, this officer was appointed, June, 1781, ensign in the former.

On his arrival at Madras, Charles Best took the field with a detachment of the two above-mentioned corps, under the command of Lieutenant-Colonel Wangenheim, and joined the British army under Major-General Stuart, then before Cuddalore, in the beginning of June, 1783. He was present at the battle of Cuddalore, 13 June, and severely wounded: he returned to Madras in July of that year, with the sick and wounded, and was promoted to a 2nd lieutenant 24 July 1784. Lieutenant Best continued in India during the peace, in different garrisons, and until the period when the service of his corps expired.

The 15th Regiment was sent home in 1791, and disbanded; the 14th was sent home in 1792, and remained on the strength of the Hanoverian Army. In 1793, it was appointed a light infantry regiment and Lieutenant Best nominated 1st lieutenant to one of the rifle companies. He joined the British and Hanoverian army, under the command of Frederick, Duke of York, in April, 1794, in Flanders; he was present at the battle of Mouscron (25 April 1794), when the French army under General Pichegru, invaded Flanders. The allies retreated, fighting, to Courtray, which place being soon after taken by the French, Lieutenant Best had a narrow escape of being made prisoner. He was engaged at the battles of 18 and 22 May 1794; and also at the battle of Rouselaer and Hooglede (13 June). He was promoted to a company 24 July 1794. Captain Best was present at most of the out-post affairs on the rivers Dommel and Aa, as well as other skirmishes, retreating upon the Meuse, and passing through Grave to the Waal: he was engaged in some skirmishes with the enemy near fort St. Andree. In October 1794, he was engaged in an out-post fight with the enemy before Nijmegen, by which the troops of the allies were thrown into that place in the following month. The French made their approaches to Nijmegen, which they besieged; several sallies were made, and several skirmishes took place, at which Captain Best was present. The allies having evacuated Nijmegen, took up a position behind the Waal. Captain Best was present at an affair in December, near Raudwyk, when a party of the enemy had passed the Waal, and surprised a detachment guarding a strong battery in the night; but which was retaken by the allies. He was next present at a battle near Donawert (10 June 1795), when the French succeeded in crossing the Waal, on the ice: the allies retreated to the Rhine, and a severe skirmish took place at Velp, near Arnhem, in the same month. They afterwards retreated towards Zutphen, and thence to Münster, in Germany. Captain Best was engaged in two severe actions, post affairs, in February 1705, at Gronde: at first the allies drove the enemy back to Enschede, in the Netherlands; at the second they were obliged to retreat, and take up a position behind the Ems, where several skirmishes took place; the British Army retreating towards Bremen, where they were embarked for England.

The Prussians having made a separate peace with France in April, 1795, the Hanoverians also retreated, but remained in Münster and Osnabrück to the end of the year, and returned to Hanover in December 1795. In 1796, the Prussians and Hanoverians drew up a line of observation, or neutrality, and the regiment to which Captain Best belonged was among the troops employed on this service.

In 1803, when the Electorate of Hanover was taken possession of by the French, and most of the military re-assembled under the British banners, this officer was gazetted brigadier-major to the Kings German Legion (KGL), 15 September 1804; and in February following, appointed to a majority in the 2nd Light Infantry Battalion He embarked in September 1805, for Germany, under the orders of Major-General George Don, and afterwards under Lord Cathcart; he disembarked in the Elbe river in November, and re-embarked in February 1806, at Cuxhaven, after the battle of Austerlitz, and was sent to Ireland, where he remained until May, 1807, when he embarked with the 2nd Light Battalion at Monkstown, and sailed for England.

Major Best took the command of the 2nd Light Battalion and sailed with a large fleet from the Downs, in the beginning of July, 1807, for the Baltic; he disembarked at the Isle of liugen, then belonging to the Swedes, and re-embarked the beginning of August on account of the peace. He next sailed with the expedition for Zealand, and landed in Kioge Bay: he commanded a detachment of the troops that marched for Copenhagen, and on 26 August drove in the out-post, and took possession of part of the suburbs of that city, which afterwards greatly facilitated the operations of the besieging army. For this service Major Best received a flattering encomium, as well as Major Halkett, who was under his command, in the division orders of Lieutenant-General Sir David Baird. Major Best was present and assisted in the whole of the siege of Copenhagen, and afterwards received the thanks of Parliament, along with the army, as commanding officer of the 2nd light Battalion.

Major Best returned in November 1807, to England, and embarked at Ramsgate at the end of April, 1808, under the orders of Lieutenant-General Sir John Moore, and sailed for the Baltic in May; and thence accompanied Sir John to the Iberian Peninsula: he was with the army in the advance into, and retreat through Spain.

In July, 1809, he embarked with the British troops, under the command of Lord Chatham, and sailed at the end of that month for the Scheldt (on the Walcheren Campaign); he assisted at the siege of Flushing, which surrendered 1 August; he then went to the opposite island, Sud Beveland, and returned to Walcheren the beginning of September.

Best received the rank of lieutenant-colonel, by brevet, 1 January 1812, and was appointed, 19 May 1812 lieutenant-colonel of the 8th Line Battalion KGL, then in Sicily. In March, 1814, he was sent with a detachment to Hanover, and appointed colonel in the Hanoverian service (16 March). He received the command of a brigade, consisting of four battalions of Hanoverian Landwehr (militia) and marched: for Brabant and Flanders in August 1814, and was stationed at Bruges in Flanders until Napoleon Bonaparte landed in France in 1815.

Best was then ordered with his brigade to Ypres, and took the command of the troops in that place, as well as that of the fortress, until the beginning of May, when a governor was appointed, to whom he delivered the command, and marched with his brigade, (the 4th Hanoverians) to Brussels; being brigaded to the 5th Division of the army under the Duke of Wellington. Having received, on the night of 15 June, an order to march with the Scotch brigade, Colonel Best left Brussels at day-break on 16 June, and at about 15:00 of that day was engaged with the enemy under Marshal Ney in the Battle of Quatre Bras. One of the battalions of Colonel Best's brigade was engaged the whole day, and had an opportunity of distinguishing itself: and another battalion, the Landwehr Battalion Lüneburg under command of Lieutenant-Colonel Ludwig Heinrich Philipp von Ramdohr, by its well-directed fire and steadiness, destroyed a charge of the French Cuirassiers.

On 18 June at the Battle of Waterloo, the brigade under Colonel Best's command was warmly engaged, and received Major-General Sir Kempt's approbation, to whom the command of the 5th Division was given, after its general, Sir Thomas Picton, was killed. Colonel Best returned to Hanover with the brigade in December 1815, and was nominated a Knight Commander of the Hanoverian Guelphic Order. On 14 September 1816, he was appointed colonel and proprietor of the Hanoverian Infantry Regiment Celte, and 14 September 1816, major-general in that service.

== Family ==
In 1823, Charles Best married Louisa, only daughter of Captain Roberson (by then deceased), formally of the Hanoverian 2nd Light Battalion.

== Sources ==
- Hülsemann, Bernhard (1863), Geschichte des Königlich-hannoverschen Vierten Infanterie-Regiments und seiner Stammkörper, von der ersten Errichtung der Letzteren bis zum Jahre 1848, unter vorzüglicher Berücksichtigung der Feldzüge von 1813, 1814, 1815 und des Schleswig-holsteinischen Feldzuges von 1848 (in German), Helwing'sche Hofbuchhandlung, p. 99
- Philippart, John, ed. (1820), The Royal Military Calendar, Or Army Service and Commission Book: Containing the Services and Progress of Promotion of the Generals, Lieutenant-generals, Major-generals, Colonels, Lieutenant-colonels, and Majors of the Army, According to Seniority:... (3 ed.), A.J. Valpy, pp. 386–390
- Scott, John; Taylor, John (1823), "Ecclesiastical Preferments–Births–Marriages", The London Magazine, vol. 7, Taylor and Hessey, p. 367
