= Ompteda =

Ompteda is a surname. Notable people with the surname include:

- Christian Friedrich Wilhelm von Ompteda (1765–1815), Hanoverian officer of the Napoleonic Wars
- Dietrich Heinrich Ludwig von Ompteda (1746–1803), Hanoverian jurist and government minister
