= Charles Best =

Charles Best may refer to:

- Charles Best (poet) (1570–1627), English poet
- Charles Best (British Army officer) (1765–1836), British army officer
- Charles Best (American football) (1874–1962), American college football and basketball coach
- Charles Best (medical scientist) (1899–1978), American-Canadian medical scientist and co-discoverer of insulin
- Charles Best (politician) (1909–1996), Australian politician
- Charles Best (businessman), American businessman and founder of Donorschoose.org
- Charles Alexander Best (1931–1978), Canadian politician, son of Charles Herbert Best
