= Royal Hanoverian Army =

Armed forces of Hanover (1814–1866)

The Royal Hanoverian Army were the armed forces of the Kingdom of Hanover that existed from 1814 to 1866.

From 1814 the army of the Kingdom of Hanover was known as the Royal Hanoverian Army and Royal Army of Hanover. (Note: Oman (1913) wrote: "After the peace of 1814 all the 'mongrels' were discharged, and the officers and native-born Hanoverian rank and file became the nucleus on which the new Royal Army of Hanover was built up.") Although until 1837 Hanover was in a personal union with Great Britain the Hanoverian army furnished a sizeable contingent for the Confederation of the Rhine.

In 1832, William IV issued his troops with red coat uniforms, but they differed slightly from their original British Army versions. When the personal union with the United Kingdom ended, and Ernst August ascended to the crown of Hanover, he replaced their uniforms with Prussian Army-style ones, which included the Pickelhaube ('pointed bonnet') spiked helmet for his Guard Corps. By 1866 they wore a more Austrian style of uniform, with only the guard corps keeping the Prussian one.

During the Austro-Prussian War in 1866, the Hanoverian Army fought and defeated the Prussians during its march south towards Austria, at the Battle of Langensalza. However, the army was later surrounded and forced to surrender to Prussia, and Hanover was later annexed with the Royal Hanoverian Army being subsumed into the Prussian Army.

== See Also ==
- Hanoverian Army
- King's German Legion
- First Schleswig War
- Second Schleswig War
- Skirmish of Oversø
- Liberation of Hanover
- Charles, Count Alten
- Hugh Halkett

== Sources ==
- "Hanover Wins a Battle but Loses Its Independence". Deutschlandmuseum. n.d.
- König, Lutz (1999). "Kingdom of Hanover: Uniforms". Königreich Hannover.
- Oman, Charles (1913). "XIII The Auxiliaries: The Germans and the Portuguese". Wellington's Army, 1809–1814. London: Edward Arnold – via Project Gutenberg.
- Slade, Adolphus (1840). Travels in Germany and Russia: Including a Steam Voyage by the Danube and the Euxine from Vienna to Constantinople, in 1838–39 (PDF). London: Longman, Orme, Brown, Green and Longmans – via Wikimedia Commons.
