= Christian Friedrich Wilhelm von Ompteda =

Hanoverian army officer (1765–1815)

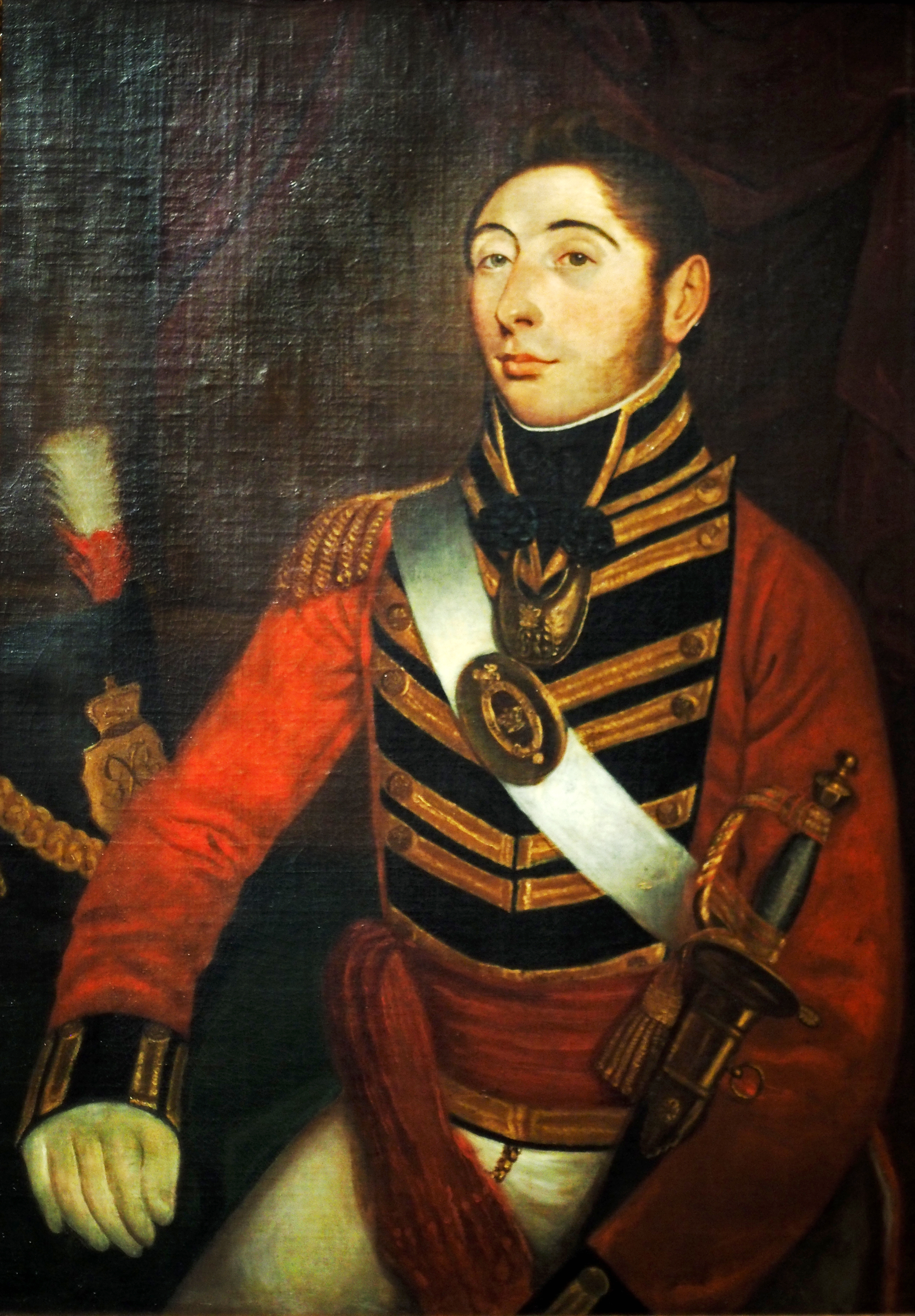
- Born: 26 November 1765; Ahlden an der Aller
- Died: 18 June 1815 (aged 49); La Haye Sainte
- Military career
- Allegiance: Electorate of Hanover; United Kingdom; Kingdom of Hanover
- Branch: Hanoverian Army; British Army
- Service years: 1781–1815
- Rank: Colonel
- Unit: King's German Legion
- Commands: 1st Light Battalion, KGL; 5th Line Battalion KGL; Brigade in Charles Alten's division
- Conflicts: French Revolutionary Wars; War of the Third Coalition; English Wars; Gunboat War; Hundred Days; Battle of Waterloo †

Colonel Christian Friedrich Wilhelm von Ompteda (26 November 1765 – 18 June 1815) was a Hanoverian army officer who served in the French Revolutionary and Napoleonic Wars. He fought in both the Hanoverian and British armies during the conflict.

== Life ==
In 1771, aged six, he was sent to be educated by his uncle Dietrich Heinrich Ludwig von Ompteda (1746–1803) and in 1777 he joined the Royal Corps of Pages at Hannover. In 1781 he became a lieutenant in the foot guards. In 1793 he rose to command a grenadier company in the French Revolutionary Wars, being badly wounded at Mont Cassel. Then in 1794, he went to England with Field Marshal Wilhelm von Freytag.

In 1803 he was a major in the Hanoverian guards regiment and, when the Convention of Artlenburg dissolved the Hanoverian Army on 5 July that year, he was one of the first to join what became the King's German Legion. In 1805 he participated in the Hanover Expedition, an unsuccessful expedition to northern Germany during the War of the Third Coalition, and a year later he and his battalion moved to Gibraltar. In 1807 they moved again, to Zealand, where they fought against Denmark in the Gunboat War (also known as the English Wars). On the return journey, his ship sank off the coast of the Netherlands and he was held prisoner in Borkum until being freed in a prisoner exchange in 1808.

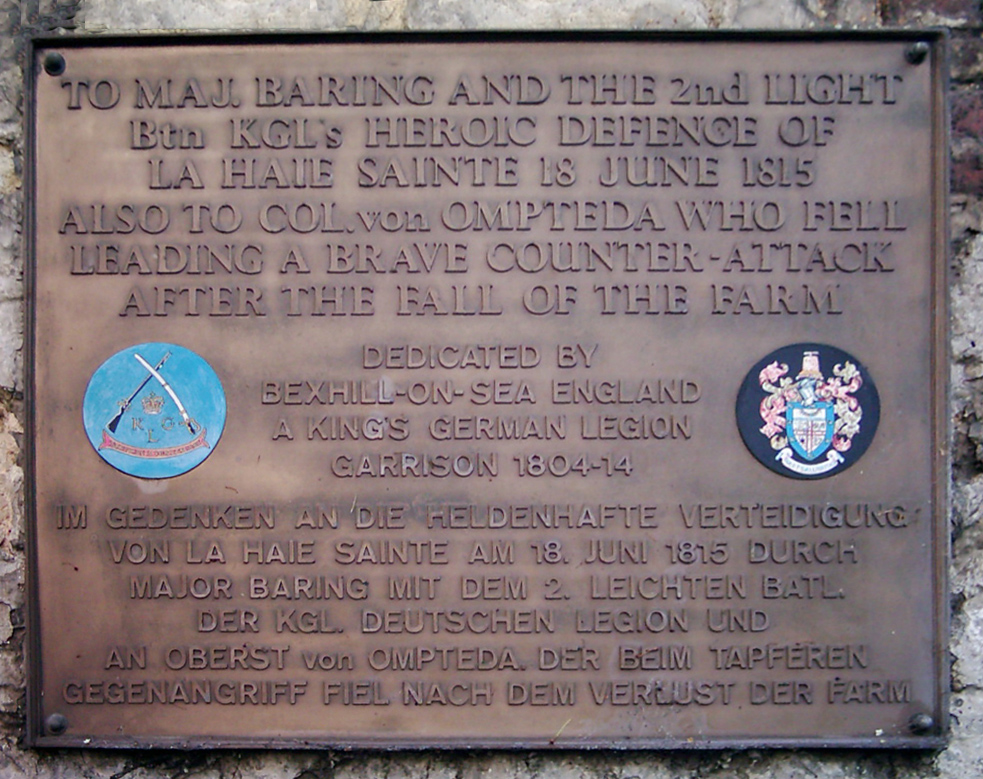
Memorial at La Haye Sainte

In 1812 he was made lieutenant colonel and in 1813 he was put in command of the Legion's 1st Light Battalion. In 1815 he was an Oberst and a brigade commander in general Charles Alten's division within Wellington's army. Ompteda was killed at Waterloo after being ordered by the Prince of Orange into a counter-attack in column with the 5th Line Battalion to retake La Haye Sainte. He had been shot at point-blank range.

== Sources ==
- Howarth, David Armine (1968). A Near Run Thing. London: Collins. ISBN 0002111195. LCCN 78365871. OCLC 220322. OL 4325460M.
