= Hugh Halkett =

British army officer (1783–1863)

General Hugh Freiherr von Halkett GCH CB
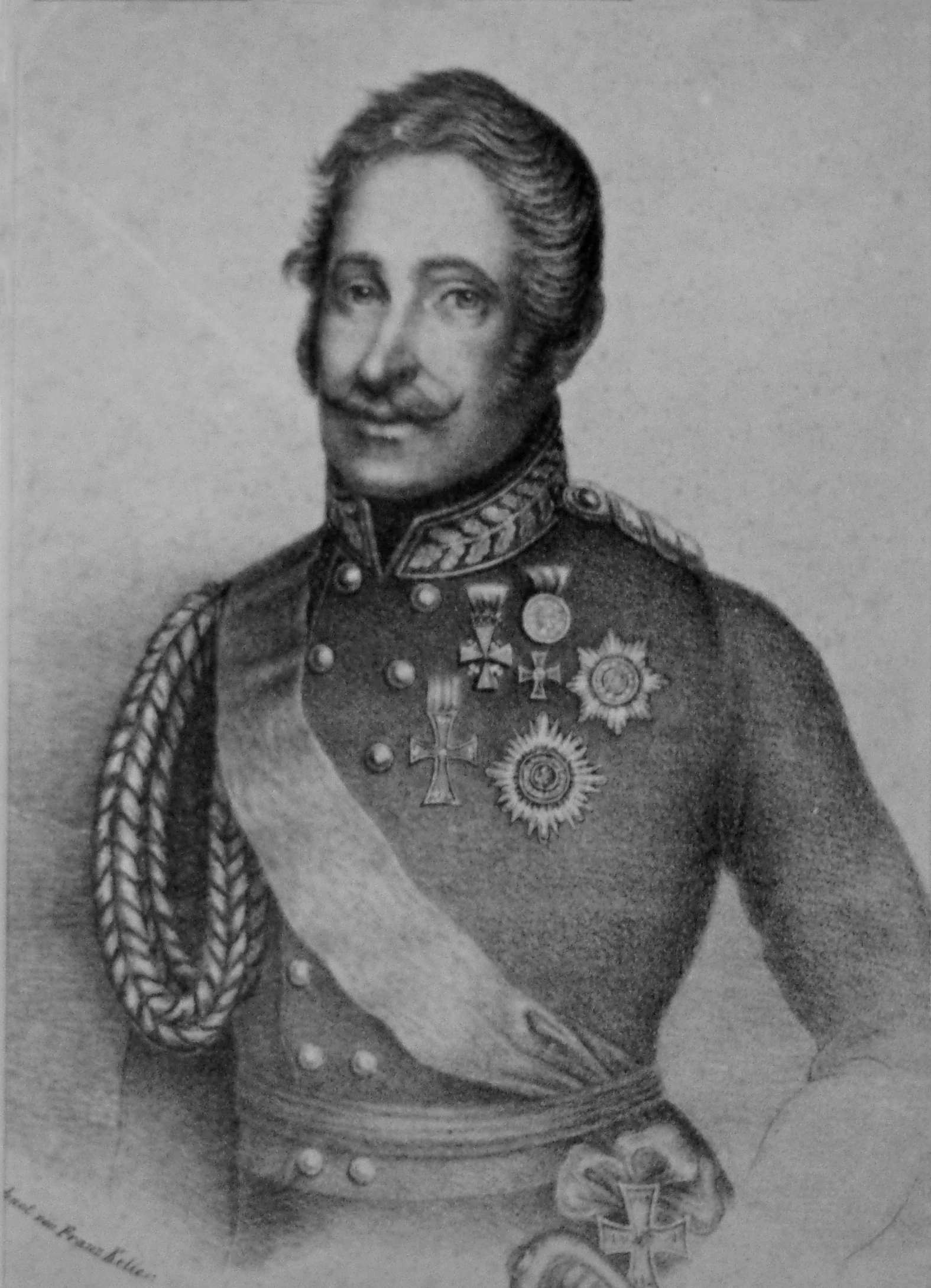
- Born: 30 August 1783; Musselburgh, East Lothian, Scotland
- Died: 10 December 1863 (aged 80)

Hugh Halkett, GCH, CB (30 August 1783 – 10 December 1863) was a British army officer who served in the French Revolutionary and Napoleonic Wars. During his military career, he served in both the British and Hanoverian armies.

== Early career ==
Halkett was born in Musselburgh, Scotland. He was second son of Major-General F. G. Halkett and brother of Lieutenant General Colin Halkett.

From 1798 to 1801, Halkett served in India in the British Army's Scotch Brigade, which his father had been instrumental in raising. In 1803 as senior captain, he joined the 2nd Light Infantry Battalion of the newly formed King's German Legion (KGL), which was under the command of his brother Colin. The 2nd Light were involved in the Cathcart's expeditions to Hanover, Rügen and Copenhagen. During this time he was promoted to major and his bold initiative on outpost duty won a commendation.

From 1808 until 1813 Halkett fought in the Peninsular War, except in 1809 when he took part in the Walcheren Expedition. He fought at the Battle of Albuera in Charles Alten's independent KGL brigade. When his brother was promoted to lead the brigade, Halkett took over command of the 2nd Light Infantry Battalion, KGL. At the Battle of Salamanca, his battalion fought in John Hope's 7th Division. In the Siege of Burgos campaign, he distinguished himself at the Battle of Venta del Pozo. In 1813 he joined the newly reformed Hanoverian Army. At the Battle of the Göhrde he led a brigade of Hanoverian troops under Ludwig von Wallmoden-Gimborn. He captured a Danish standard at the Battle of Sehested.

== Waterloo and later career ==
At the Battle of Waterloo, Halkett commanded four battalions of Hanoverian landwehr which were sent to the front with the regulars. These units were organised into the 3rd Hanoverian Brigade of Lieutenant General Sir Henry Clinton's 2nd Division. Halkett's brigade was held in reserve on the right flank for most of the battle. After the defeat of Napoleon's Imperial Guard, the Duke of Wellington sent Halkett to pursue the disintegrating French forces. He is remembered for capturing General Pierre Cambronne while his Osnabrück Battalion engaged the French Imperial Guard.

After Waterloo, Halkett stayed in the Hanoverian service. He rose to be a general and inspector-general of infantry. He led a Federal Army Corps in the First War of Schleswig (also known as the Prussian-Danish War of 1848), and defeated the Danes at the Skirmish of Oversø, a rear-guard action at Sankelmark.

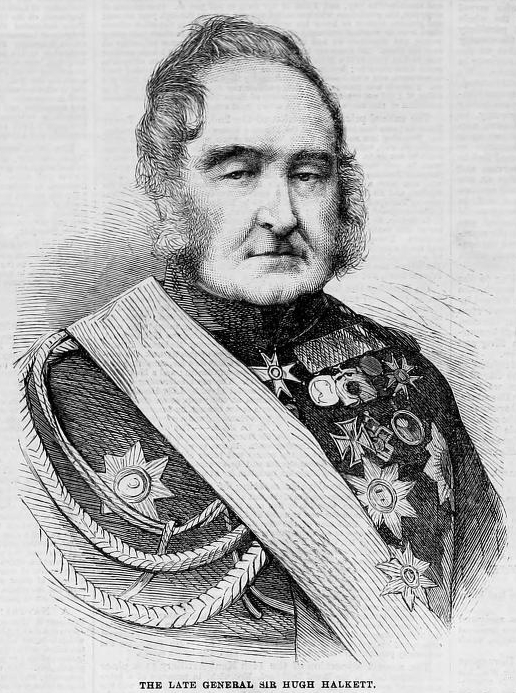
Halkett in later life

Halkett held many foreign orders, including the Prussian Order of the Black Eagle, the Pour le Mérite and the Russian Order of St. Anna. He was appointed a Knight Commander of the Royal Guelphic Order in 1815 and promoted to Knight Grand Cross in 1851. In 1862, he was ennobled (heritable) to a Freiherr (Baron) by King George V of Hanover.

== Family ==
Halkett married Emilia Charlotte, daughter of Sir James Lamb, 1st Baronet on 25 May 1810.

== General references ==
- Knesebeck, Ernst (1865). Leben des Freiherrn Hugh von Halkett, K. hannover'scher General der Infanterie: nach dessen hinterlassenen Papieren und anderen Quellen entworfen von E. von dem Knesebeck. Stuttgart: Hallberger.
- Sichart, Louis (1851). Tagebuch des zehnten Deutschen Bundes-Armee-Corps unter dem Befehle des Königlich Hannoverschen Generals Halkett während des Feldzuges in Schleswig-Holstein im Jahre 1848. Hanover: Hahn. OCLC 230769330.
- Poten, Bernhard (1879). Historische Kommission bei der Bayerischen Akademie der Wissenschaften (ed.). "Halkett, Hugh Freiherr von" . Allgemeine Deutsche Biographie (in German). 10. Leipzig: Duncker and Humblot: 412–415 – via Wikisource.
- Smith, Digby (1998). The Napoleonic Wars Data Book. Greenhill.
