= 5th Line Battalion, King's German Legion =

Hanoverian unit in British service

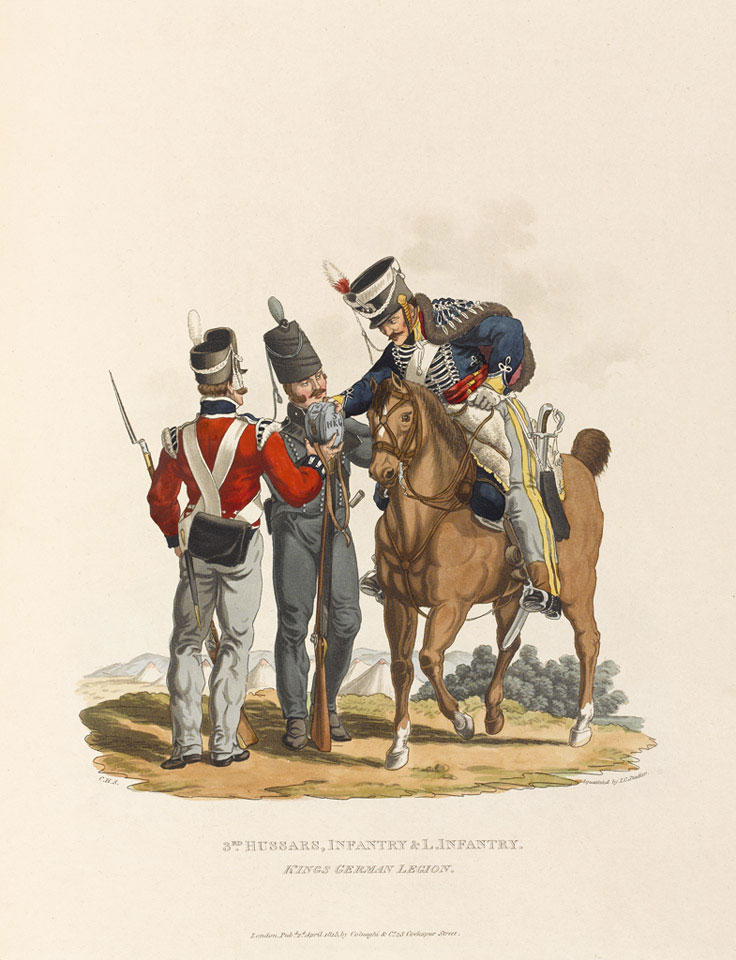
1815 engraving of a line infantryman (left) of the King's German Legion

The 5th Line Battalion, King's German Legion was a line infantry battalion of the King's German Legion, a British Army formation of expatriate German troops which fought in the Napoleonic Wars.

== Raising, service and disbandment ==
The 5th Line Battalion of the King's German Legion (abbreviated: KGL) was raised in late 1805 as the fifth out of eight line battalions that the Legion levied in total. The British Hanover Expedition at the end of 1805, which had been vacated by French troops on their way to the Battle of Austerlitz, resulted in a massive recruitment success for the KGL.

After Napoleon's victory at Austerlitz, the British expedition's position became untenable. The whole force including all participating and newly recruited KGL units re-embarked for England in February 1806. The 5th line battalion KGL was initially brigaded with the 6th Line Battalion of the Legion. It served from 1805 until 1816 in Ireland, Copenhagen, Portugal, Spain and southern France and Belgium.

The unit was part of the British occupation force in France in 1815. In December 1815 the disbandment was ordered and the troops marched back to Hannover, where they were disbanded in early 1816.

== Waterloo ==
On 18 June 1815, during the Battle of Waterloo, the battalion was nearly wiped out during the fighting in the center of Wellington's battle line, in the wake of the so-called 'crisis'. Around 6 o'clock the Prince of Orange told Sir Charles Alten, the KGL's divisional commander, to send forward the 5th line battalion to attack the French infantry, who were pursuing the men from the 2nd light battalion KGL retreating from La Haye Sainte. Col. von Ompteda, the 5th battalions commander had noticed French cavalry nearby and protested the order to Alten, but he was told to obey his general by the Prince of Orange, who had overheard the exchange. Von Ompteda mounted his horse, ordered the 5th into line (they had been formed in square to fight cavalry) and, at their head, advanced on the French infantry. The enemy infantry ran, but riding out of the mists of smoke came a regiment of cuirassiers. They charged into the flank and rear of the 5th line who, with their muskets unloaded, were cut to pieces. Von Ompteda was among those killed, a colour of the battalion was lost and only 19 men escaped back to the allied line.

Notable for his actions during the battle was the battalion's surgeon Georg Hartog Gerson. His coatee survived and is on display in Hamburg, Germany, in the "Museum für Hamburger Geschichte".

== Uniforms and equipment ==
Uniform and Equipment of the Legion's Line battalions was of standard British pattern of the time. In accord it was repeatedly revised during the years from 1803 until 1815. In general it comprised:

- Redcoat with dark blue facings
- Grey trousers
- White leather equipment
- Brown Bess musket
- Stovepipe, later Belgic shako

The principal distinction from British units was that the standard pack was painted dark blue rather than black. The 5th's light Company was partially armed with Baker rifles and was separated from the battalion at Waterloo in the midst of the battle to assist in the defence of La Haye Sainte.

== Sources ==
- Beamish, North Ludlow (1832). History of the King's German Legion. Vol. 1. London: Thomas and William Boone. OCLC 24612003.
- Beamish, North Ludlow (1837). History of the King's German Legion. Vol. 2. London: Thomas and William Boone.
- Chappell, Mike (2000). The King's German Legion (2) 1812–1816. Botley, Oxford: Osprey Publishing. ISBN 1-85532-997-2.
- "King's German Legion". Napoleonistyka. n.d.
