= Siege of Cuddalore =

1783 battle of the Second Anglo-Mysore war

- Part of the Second Anglo-Mysore War
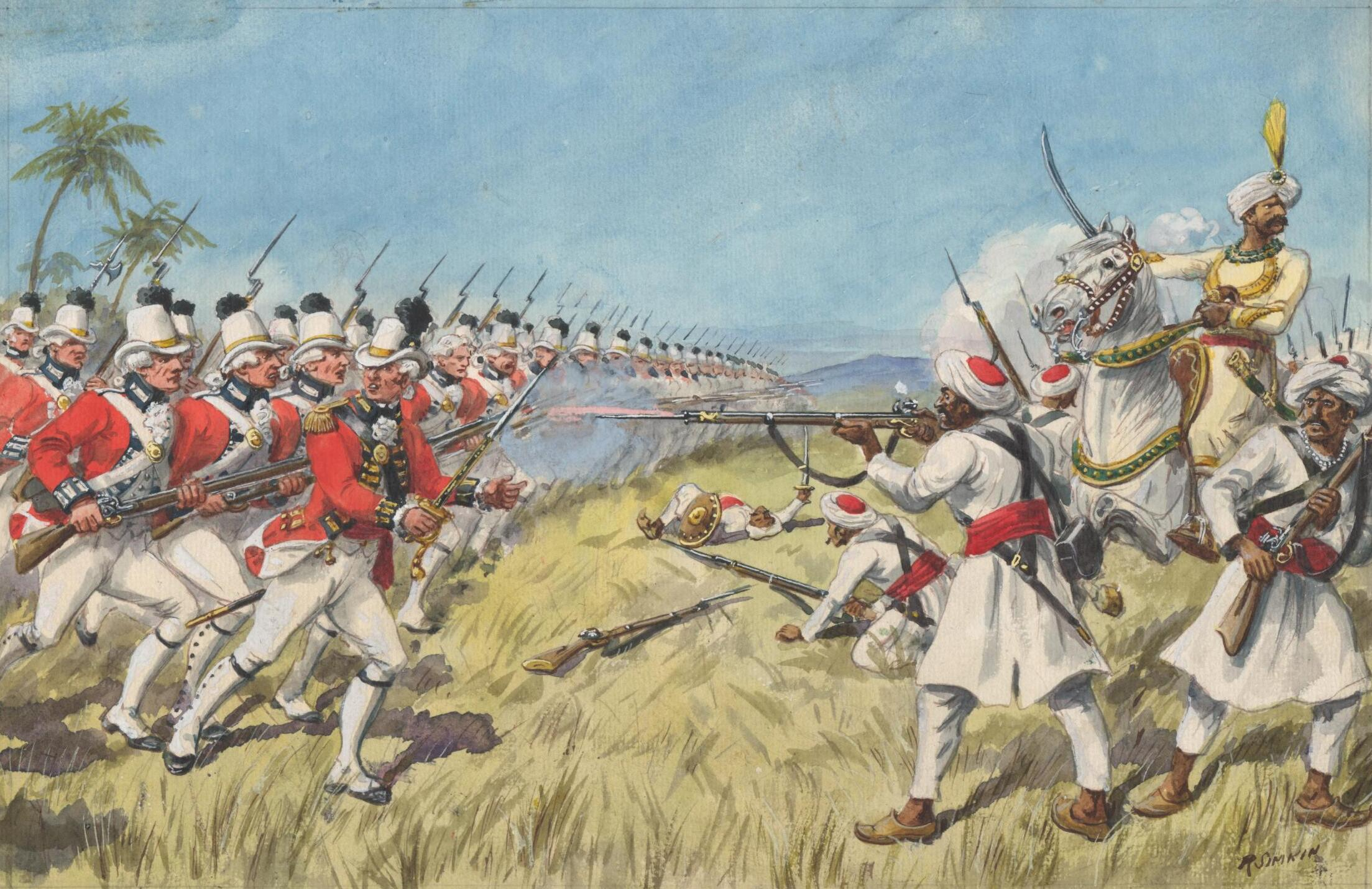
- The 1st Bengal European Regiment attacking Mysorean troops on 1 July during the siege
Date	7 June – 25 July 1783 (1 month, 2 weeks and 4 days)
Location	Cuddalore, Carnatic (present-day southeastern India) 11.75°N 79.75°E
Result	Inconclusive

Belligerents
Great Britain: British East India Company; (Electorate of Brunswick-Lüneburg) Hanover	Sultanate of Mysore; France

Commanders and leaders
(Kingdom of Great Britain) James Stuart (Kingdom of Great Britain) Edward Hughes (Electorate of Brunswick-Lüneburg) Christoph August von Wangenheim	(Kingdom of France) Marquis de Bussy-Castelnau (Kingdom of France) Pierre André de Suffren; Sayed Sahib

Strength
12,000	9,000

Casualties and losses
1,500	1,100

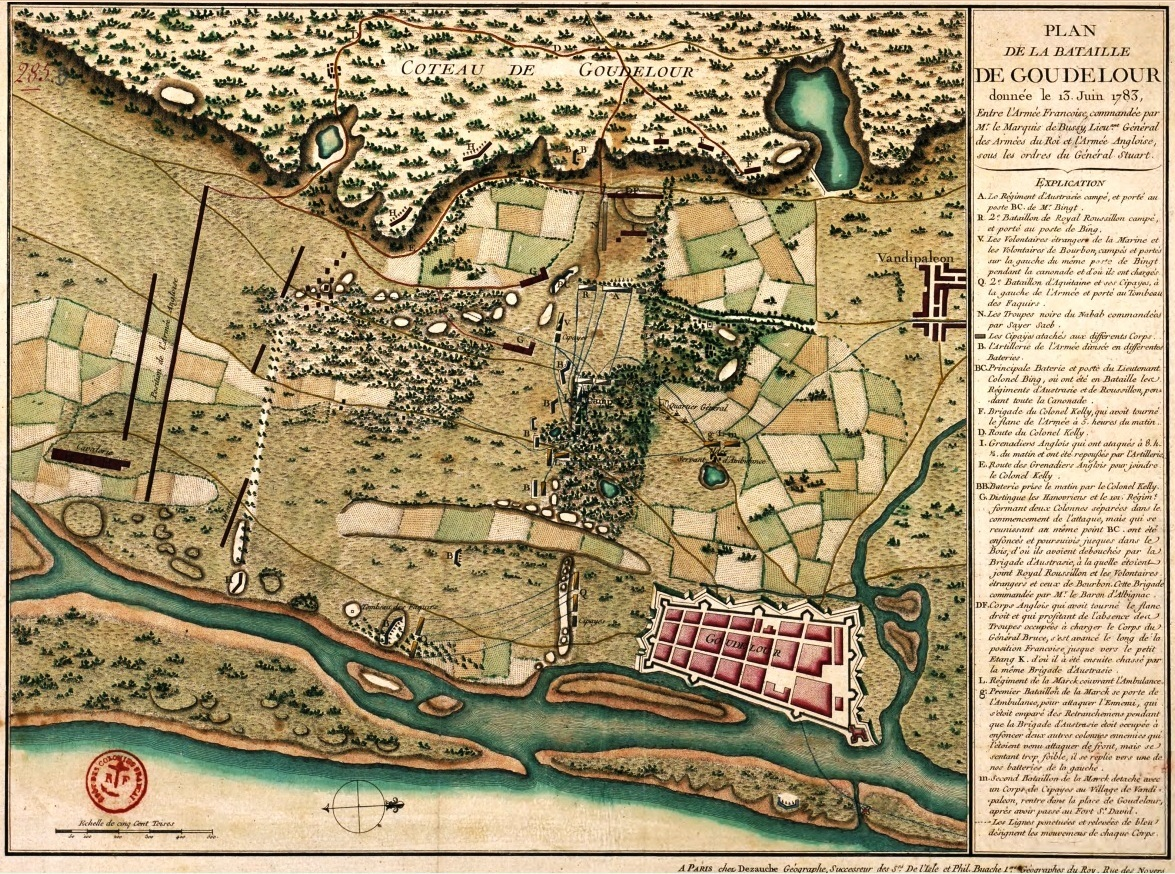
Map in French of the battle ground Cuddalore, 13 June 1783.

The siege of Cuddalore was a siege attempt by British troops against a combined French and Mysorean garrison at the fortress of Cuddalore in the Second Anglo-Mysore War. The siege ended when news arrived of a preliminary peace treaty between France and Britain.

== Background ==
A British army under Major-general James Stuart arrived outside Cuddalore on 7 June 1783. Stuart's army consisted of the British Army's 71st Regiment of Foot and 78th Regiment of Foot along with the Bengal Army's 1st Bengal European Regiment and several native units of the Presidency armies. It was subsequently reinforced by two Hanoverian Army regiments under Colonel Christoph August von Wangenheim. On 6 June Stuart's army took up a position on the sandy ground two miles from the garrison. They were between the sea on the right and the Bandipollum hills on the left, with a reserve line in the rear. The French and Mysoreans, commanded by Marquis de Bussy-Castelnau, took an intermediate and parallel position half a mile (0.8 km) in front of the fort.

== Siege ==
On 13 June, Stuart decided to attack the redoubt in front of the fort in order to press the allies harder within Cuddalore itself. The assault took place at four in the morning, granting the British army an element of surprise. Eventually, the allies were driven from their principal defences and the last allied counterattack was defeated. By mutual consent, a cessation of firing took place. The allies suffered serious losses of nearly 500 casualties. Stuart's forces also suffered heavily: more than 900 British, Hanoverian, and Sepoys were killed or wounded. Though significantly weakened, Stuart continued to besiege Cuddalore proper and prepared for further reinforcements from the sea.

=== Naval Battle ===
Key naval support for the British was interrupted on 20 June by the arrival of a French fleet under the Bailli de Suffren, which met the British fleet in a naval battle and forced it to withdraw to Madras. Suffren, with this advantage, was able to land 2,400 soldiers, marines, and sailors in support of de Bussy's garrison, resulting in nearly equal-sized forces.

=== Repulse of the French sortie ===
De Bussy's additional reinforcements now had enough men to launch a sortie on the British siege works. Stuart, aware of the newly arrived French reinforcements, prepared for a major attack. On 25 June, the French made repeated sallies on the British lines. Despite some initial progress, the French were not able to press their advantage; Stuart was able to counterattack and repel the remaining French assaults. De Bussy called off the attack after realising no progress had been made at a considerable cost. The assault was a disaster, and De Bussy had lost a great opportunity in defeating the besiegers, especially with the reinforcements he had received. French morale plummeted as they had lost the advantage in numbers and the balance had swung back in favour of the besieging British. The British had no more than 23 men killed and wounded, while De Bussy's attacking force had 450 killed and wounded with another 150 taken prisoner. A number of French officers were captured including the leader of the assault, the Chevalier de Dumas, who was captured unwounded.

Among the French prisoners was a young sergeant in the French marines who was also wounded and had landed from Suffren's squadron on 20 June; Jean Bernadotte became a Marshal of France and, more famously, was later crowned the King of Sweden. Modern historians, however, regard this story as apocryphal, noting that Bernadotte never served in India and that the tale likely arose from a misunderstanding during his later service in Germany.

=== End of the siege ===
The siege continued for another five days. Both sides were weakening from disease and growing casualties, but Stuart's forces suffered more heavily than De Bussy's. Stuart wrote letters to the Madras government asserting that he had been abandoned. De Bussy planned another attack by a more circuitous route directed at the main camp of the British forces, but this attack was not carried out before a British frigate arrived on 30 June with news of a preliminary peace between France and Britain.

== Aftermath ==
On 2 July, Britain and France negotiated a cessation of hostilities, although the war between Mysore and Britain remained ongoing. In the Peace of Paris (1783), Cuddalore was returned to Great Britain in exchange for Pondicherry and Mahé, two French territories that British forces had captured earlier in the war. Fighting continued between the British and Mysoreans until the Treaty of Mangalore was signed in March 1784.
