= Georg Hartog Gerson =

Medical doctor and surgeon in the King's German Legion

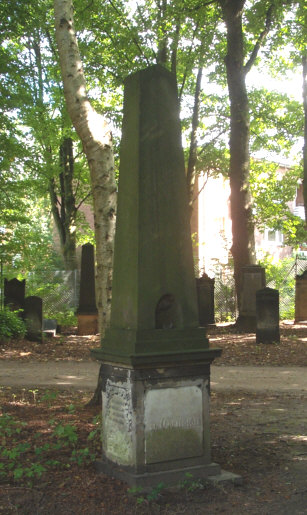
Memorial to Gerson

Georg Hartog Gerson (25 August 1788 – 3 December 1844) was a medical doctor and surgeon in the King's German Legion during the Napoleonic Wars.

Gerson was born in Hamburg. He came from a family of doctors that had been living and working since the 17th century in Hamburg and Altona, which was a part of the Duchy of Holstein at the time. His grandfather was the principal of the Jewish hospital in Altona, and his father and elder brothers were also medical doctors. After his education at home, he visited the secondary grammar school (Gymnasium) and specialised in the classical languages and natural sciences (especially in botany). He studied from 1805 at the University of Berlin and from 1809 at the University of Göttingen. Here he earned his medical doctorate on 7 April 1810, before habilitating in Hamburg in 1811 and joined the King's German Legion as hospital mate.

== Military career ==
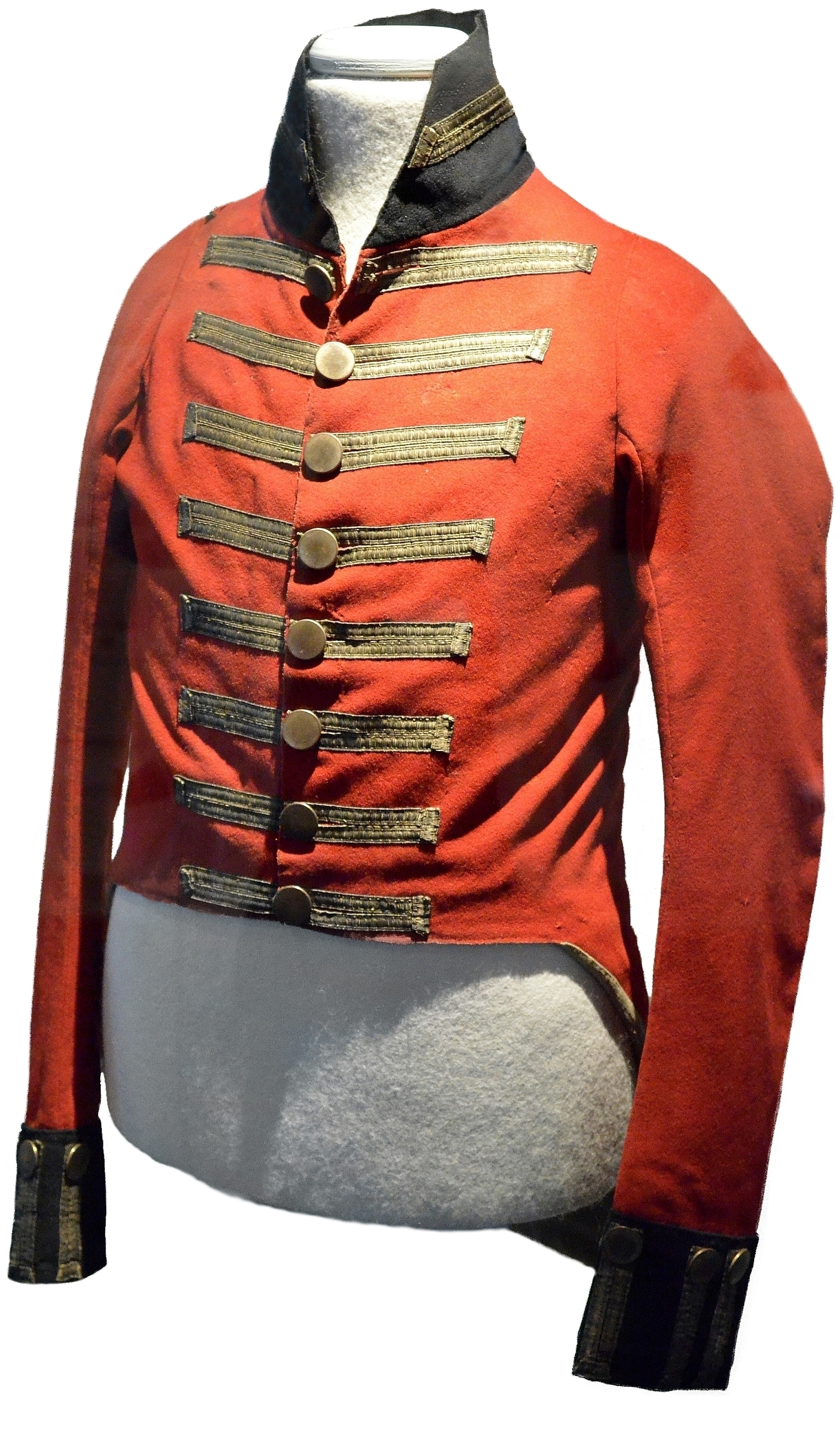
Uniform of Gerson

As early as 12 August 1811 he was proposed for the position of Assistant Surgeon, and he received this commission on 6 September 1811 for the 5th Line Battalion, King's German Legion. Gerson then saw action in the Peninsular War, in Southern France, the Lowlands and at the Battle of Waterloo.

A rare eagerness was seen in the assistant surgeon Gerson of this 5th line battalion, who not only stayed in the carree during the fiercest of fighting, dressing with fervour and skill the wounded of his battalion, but also caring for those of the neighbouring Hanoverian troops. In this way he saved the live of many brave men, voluntary exposing his own life, he rightly gained the admiration of every eyewitness, and Colonel von Ompteda, commander of the brigade, shortly before the charge which cost his life, expressed his great appreciation publicly.

After the battle Gerson was in charge of the Hôpital de la Gendàmerie in Brussels.

== Civilian career ==
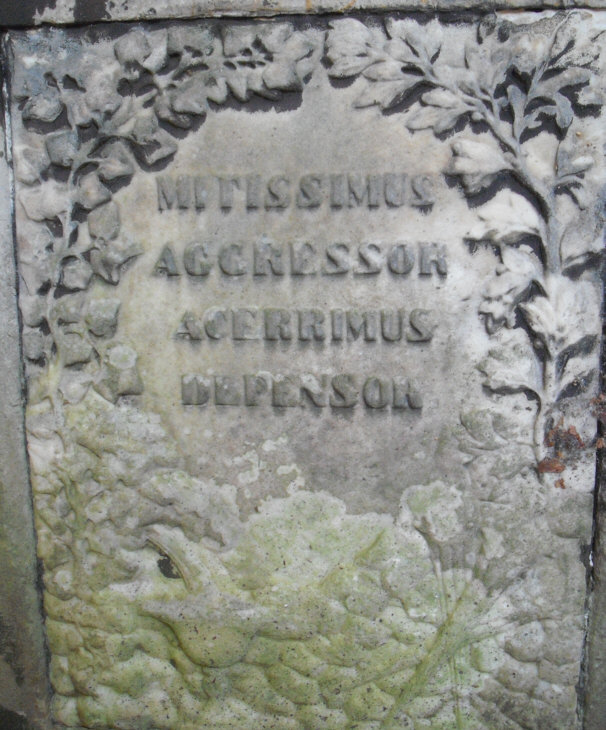
Detail of the memorial to Gerson

After the legion was dissolved in 1816 he returned to Hamburg and mainly worked as an author initially, but his surgery was expanding quickly and he gained a reputation as doctor and surgeon. In 1833, he was appointed as teacher for anatomy at the medical-surgery school and also worked from time to time as a chief surgeon at the Allgemeine Krankenhaus. In 1839, he became ill with a chronic disease that led to his sudden death on 3 December 1844 in Hamburg and he was laid to rest in the Jewish cemetery Grindelfriedhof. However, during the Third Reich, the cemetery was dissolved and the graves were reburied with their gravestones in the Jewish Cemetery Ohlsdorf. There his memorial can still be seen today. The inscription on one side reads Mitissimus Aggressor – Acerrimus Defensor (transl. A mild aggressor – a sharp defender).

His uniform jacket that he (presumably) wore at the battle of Waterloo is in the Hamburg Museum at the Museum für Hamburgische Geschichte (lit. 'Museum for the History of Hamburg'). It is believed to be the only jacket of a surgeon of the British and allied forces from Napoleonic times still in existence.

== Honorary distinctions ==
- Waterloo Medal (Britain)

== General references ==
- Literatur von und über Georg Hartog Gerson im Karlsruher Virtuellen Katalog (de)
- Beamish, N.Ludlow: History of the King's German Legion, 2 Vol. 1832 and 1837. (reprint) Naval & Military Press, Dallington, East Sussex, 1997, 2 Volumes ISBN 0-9522011-0-0
- Beamish, N.Ludlow: Geschichte der Königlich Deutschen Legion Band 2 1837 ('Google books' page 387f )
- Führer durch das Museum für Hamburgische Geschichte (Guide through the Museum for Hamburg's History) (de)
- Michael, J.: Geschichte des ärztlichen Vereins und seiner Mitglieder, Hamburg 1896 (de)
- Schröder: Lexikon hamburgischer Schriftsteller 1854 (de)
