= Skirmish of Oversø =

- Part of the First Schleswig War
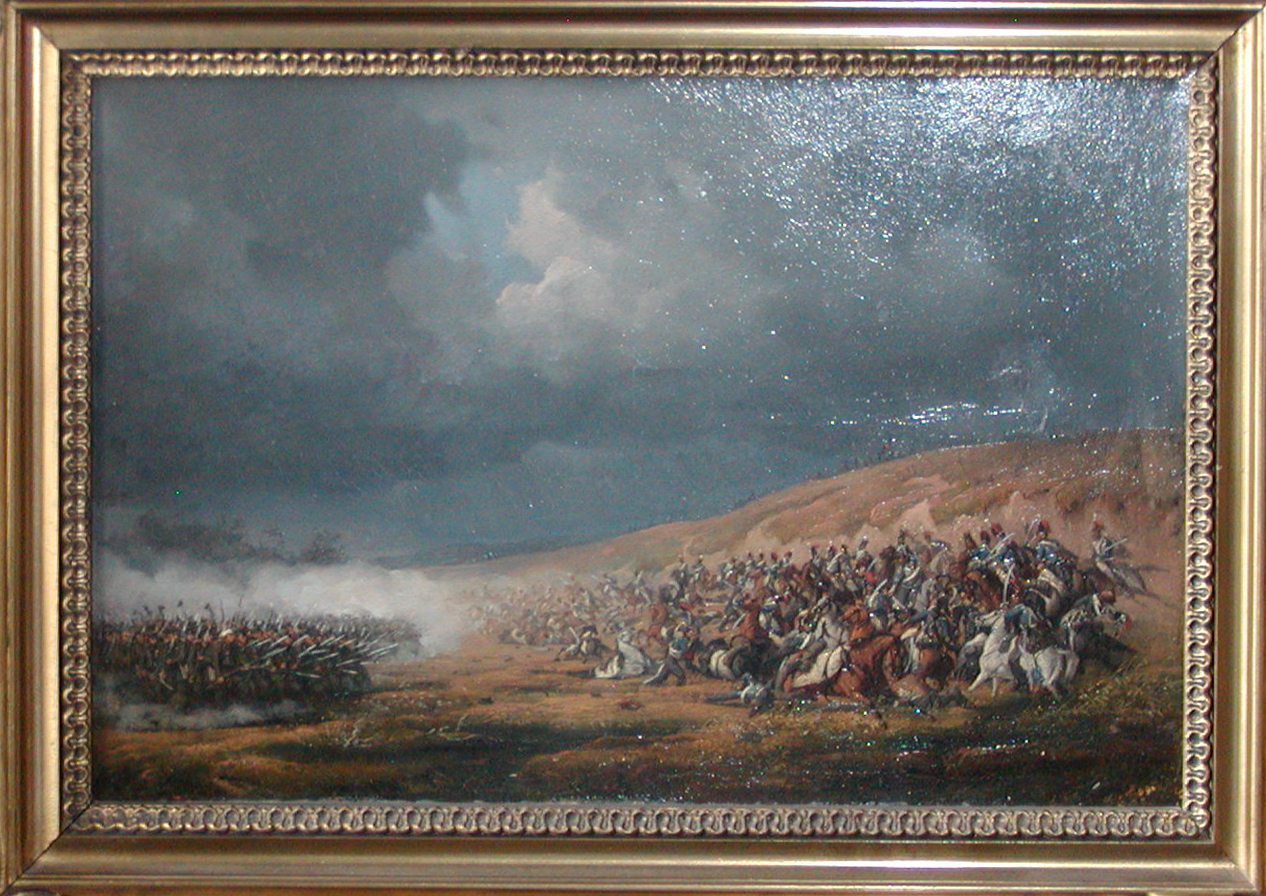
- 2 jaegercorps at the Skirmish of Oversø by Niels Simonsen
Date	24 April 1848
Location	near Flensburg, Southern Schleswig
Result	German victory

Belligerents
Hanover; Mecklenburg-Schwerin	Denmark

Commanders and leaders
(Kingdom of Hanover) Hugh Halkett (Grand Duchy of Mecklenburg-Schwerin) Ulrich von der Horst	(Denmark) Theodor Faaborg (Denmark) Frederik Hammer

Strength
10,000	2 jager corps 5 dragoon regiments 2 guns

Casualties and losses
Minimal	4 killed 26 wounded

The Skirmish of Oversø near Flensburg (now part of Germany) was a German victory of the Danish forces in the struggle for Schleswig-Holstein. The German forces included contingents from the Kingdom of Hanover and Duchy of Mecklenburg.
