= Christoph August von Wangenheim =

Hanoverian Army officer and politician

Major-General Christoph August von Wangenheim (23 March 1741 – 23 June 1830) was a Hanoverian Army officer and politician. (Note: Also spelt Christian August von Wangenheim.)

== Biography ==
Wangenheim entered the Hanoverian Army in 1757. Over the next twenty years he was gradually promoted and became a major in 1777. Between 1782–1787, Wangenheim served in India with the East India Company but retained his commission in the Royal Hanoverian army. During this time, he kept a concise diary, which was published as an annotated version in 2017. He commanded a Hanoverian brigade at the Battle of Cuddalore (13 June 1783). (Note: There is some confusion in the sources: Mlynek (2002) says he commanded the 16th regiment, but Philippart (1820) says the brigade consisted of the 14th and 15th regiments.) Also during that time he led a contingent of 1,400 Hanoverians, along with a company of European and sepoy soldiers to suppress a mutiny of a British Army regiment. In 1797 he was promoted to Major-General.

A popular anecdote, repeated in several 19th-century works, claims that during the Siege of Cuddalore in 1783, Wangenheim (often spelled Von Gonheim in earlier sources) treated a wounded French sergeant of the Royal-la-Marine Regiment with kindness while the latter was a prisoner of war. According to later retellings, when Jean-Baptiste Bernadotte commanded French forces in Hanover (1803–1805), he recognised Wangenheim and thanked him for his compassion two decades earlier.

However, modern scholarship has established the story to be apocryphal. The most credible version of events suggests that the story arose from a misunderstanding during a Hanoverian levee held in Hanover around 1805. During that event, Wangenheim had mentioned to Bernadotte that he had once nursed a young French sergeant from the Royal-la-Marine Regiment at Cuddalore. Bernadotte, wishing to honour the officer's kindness and to spare his regiment from any appearance of ingratitude, spontaneously claimed to have been that young man, thanking Wangenheim in person and publicly showering him with marks of favour. The gesture made a favourable impression among those present, and the story quickly spread across Europe as a genuine biographical detail. When his aides later expressed surprise, noting that they had never heard of his supposed service in India, Bernadotte reportedly laughed and admitted that it was "the first time he had heard of it himself." Later historians have identified the tale as an example of Bernadotte's Gascon humour and diplomatic tact, rather than a factual record of his service in India.

Between 1814 and 1819, Wangenheim was a member of the Hanoverian Parliament. In 1819 he accepted the office of Hofmarschall (an administrative post in charge of a princely German court).

== Sources ==
- Arielli, Nir; Collins, Bruce, eds. (2012). "The Hanoverian Regiments in colonial service". Transnational Soldiers: Foreign Military Enlistment in the Modern Era. Palgrave Macmillan. pp. 40–43. ISBN 9781137188038.
- Barton, Dunbar Plunket (1914). Bernadotte, the first phase, 1763-1799. The Library of Congress. New York, Scribner.
- Mlynek, Klaus (2002). "Wangenheim von". In Böttcher, Dirk; Mlynek, Klaus; Röhrbein, Waldemar R.; Thielen, Hugo (eds.). Hannoversches Biographisches Lexikon: Von den Anfängen bis in die Gegenwart (in German). Hanover: Schlütersche Verlagsgesellschaft. p. 376. ISBN 978-3-87706-706-2. LCCN 2002550672. OCLC 231977507. OL 3663458M. Wikidata Q1301650.
- Philippart, John, ed. (1820). The Royal Military Calendar, Or Army Service and Commission Book: Containing the Services and Progress of Promotion of the Generals, Lieutenant-generals, Major-generals, Colonels, Lieutenant-colonels, and Majors of the Army, According to Seniority:... (3 ed.). A.J. Valpy. pp. 386–390.
- Tzoref Ashkenazi, Chen (2019). "German soldiers in eighteenth century India". MIDA Archival Reflexicon: 1–8.
- Wilks, Mark (1817). Historical Sketches of the South of India, in an Attempt to Trace the History of Mysoor: From the Origin of the Hindoo Government of that State, to the Extinction of the Mohammedan Dynasty in 1799 ... Longman, Hurst, Rees, and Orme. p. 441–443.
