= Hanover Expedition =

1805–1806 expedition during the War of the Third Coalition

- Part of War of the Third Coalition
Date	19 November 1805 – 15 February 1806
Location	Electorate of Hanover
Result	French victory
Territorial changes	British evacuation of Hanover

Belligerents
(United Kingdom of Great Britain and Ireland) United Kingdom; Russian Empire; Sweden	(First French Empire) France (Kingdom of Prussia) Prussia

Commanders and leaders
(United Kingdom of Great Britain and Ireland) Sir George Don (United Kingdom of Great Britain and Ireland) Lord Cathcart (Russian Empire) Pyotr Aleksandrovich Tolstoy (Sweden) Gustav IV Adolf	Napoleon I (Kingdom of Prussia) Friedrich Adolf, Count von Kalckreuth

Units involved
Allied armies	Local garrisons

Strength
Britain: 25,000; Russia: 20,000; Sweden: 10,000	France: 4,000; Prussia: 50,000

Casualties and losses
1,000+ (British shipwrecks)	Unknown, minor

The Hanover Expedition, also known as the Weser Expedition, was a British invasion of the Electorate of Hanover during the Napoleonic Wars. Coordinated as part of an attack on France by the nations of the Third Coalition against Napoleon by William Pitt the Younger and Robert Stewart, Viscount Castlereagh, planning began for an invasion of French territories in July 1805. Hanover, previously a British possession, was chosen as the goal of the expedition, with Swedish and Russian forces under Gustav IV Adolf and Count Pyotr Aleksandrovich Tolstoy brought in to support the endeavour. Key to the success of the invasion was the support of Prussia, a nation poised to threaten France but not as yet openly hostile to the country. Sir George Don commanded the British expedition and he arrived with an army of around 14,000 men at Cuxhaven in November. To bolster the expedition and to strengthen the resolve of Prussia, Don's army was reinforced by 12,000, with Lord Cathcart taking over command.

Coordination between the British, Swedes, and Russians in Hanover was so poor that by December very little past the occupation of Hanover had been achieved. Cathcart grouped his force around the Weser, and soon after learned of the Austro-Russian defeat at the Battle of Austerlitz, which forced the Austrians to surrender and the Russians to retreat into Poland. With no large armies now protecting Cathcart's force from French attack, the situation was exacerbated when Prussia signed the Treaty of Schönbrunn with France, which created an alliance between the two nations and agreed that Prussia should control Hanover. With French and Prussian forces moving against Hanover, Cathcart's army was recalled in January 1806. The evacuation was completed on 15 February, and Hanover was left to the occupation of a Prussian army. The expedition, while a total failure, had little effect on the British position because of the lack of combat. Its method of quick amphibious transportation and landings of troops on a foreign shore would go on to be imitated in the Walcheren Expedition in 1809.

== Background ==
In the first years of the French Revolutionary and Napoleonic Wars Britain found increased difficulty in engaging France in land battles. With British control of the seas and with many of the French colonies already taken because of this, France provided little opportunity for Britain to attack her apart from at sea. The small British Army was not equipped to engage in an invasion of the highly defended French mainland, and so continued to rely on the Royal Navy's blockade of Brest as the best way to impact the French at home. This outlook changed in 1803 when Austria and Russia allied themselves to Britain as part of the Third Coalition. With more militarily impressive allies now available to take the war to France on land, the British Army would be able to do the same, safe in the knowledge that it would not be engaging the French armies alone. This combined with the creation of the King's German Legion in 1804 produced an opportunity for new British Army operations. In around October 1805 Napoleon's planned invasion of the United Kingdom was called off and the Grande Armée left its encampments at Boulogne to march towards the Russians and Austrians.

With the largest portions of the French army gone, an opening was created for a British incursion into northwest Germany, with particular interest in the re-taking of the Electorate of Hanover, which George III had controlled until 1803, and which had only 4,000 French troops remaining in it. The British Prime Minister, William Pitt the Younger, and his Secretary of State for War and the Colonies Robert Stewart, Viscount Castlereagh, were strong supporters of the enterprise, having championed it from as early as July. They envisaged an amphibious army that could be landed at points across Napoleonic Europe, making "pinprick" attacks against enemy targets while avoiding large battles with the French that could result in "crippling defeat". With news of the French withdrawal having reached Britain before its culmination, Castlereagh began planning in September. By taking Hanover, Britain could restore the country to its rightful rulers while also gaining a useful springboard for further operations in Europe. Not all of the establishment was in favour of the endeavour, with the Commander-in-Chief of the Forces, the Duke of York, relying on his experience in the Flanders campaign, arguing that expeditions that relied too much on the allies' actions would be difficult.

== Planning ==
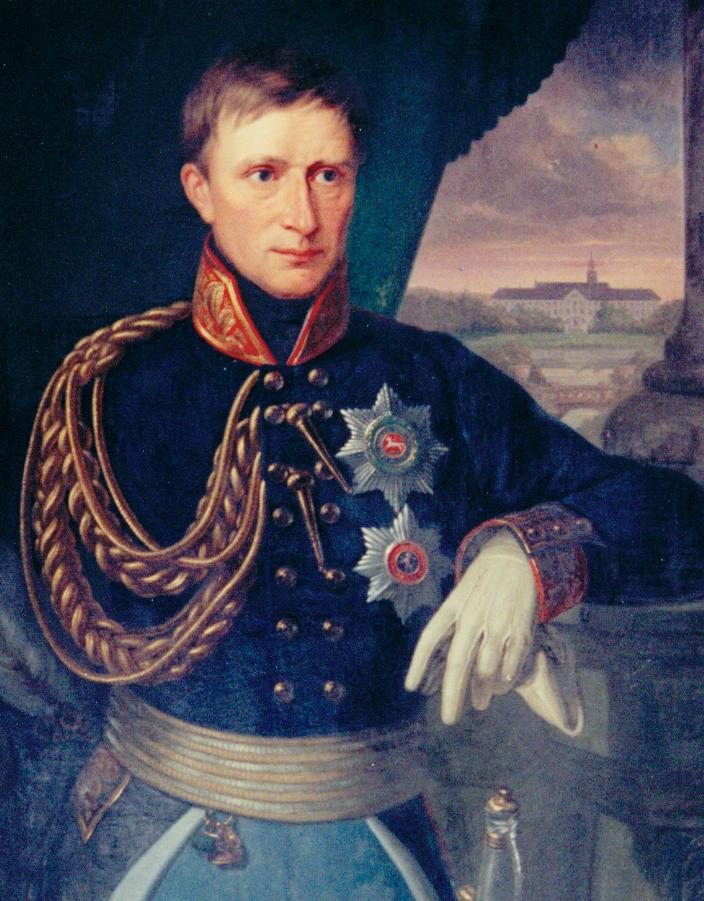
Friedrich von der Decken, planner of the initial expedition in November 1805

Castlereagh estimated that the retirement of the French armies from the Channel coast had freed up between 40,000 and 60,000 British soldiers for service abroad. With this in mind, original estimates for an expedition planned for a large "disposable force" commanded by Lieutenant-General Lord Cathcart. This would have included two divisions of cavalry, one of light dragoons and the other of heavy cavalry, consisting of 9,600 men. Alongside the cavalry plans called for seven divisions of infantry, including four battalions of Foot Guards and forty of line infantry. These divisions would have each had around 5,000 men, and would have been supported by a light infantry brigade of four more infantry battalions, six brigades of Royal Horse Artillery, and ten brigades of Royal Artillery. Military historian C. T. Atkinson suggests that this force, if it had come to fruition, would have been "a really formidable effort".

This large army, while viable on paper, would have been very difficult to form up and transport in reality, and so on 10 October a much smaller army was hastily brought together to cross the North Sea under the command of Lieutenant-General Sir George Don, who was expected to also instigate diplomatic connections with the allied nations. While the original plan had expected the creation of multiple divisions, Don's force was instead made up of two cavalry and six infantry regiments of the King's German Legion (KGL) which were controlled by Brigadier-General Friedrich von der Decken, (Note: While von der Decken was recorded as the commander of the KGL forces, they were split into brigades with their own commanders as well. Major-General Karl von Linsingen had the cavalry brigade, with Colonel Charles, Count Alten commanding the light brigade, and two infantry brigades commanded respectively by Colonels Ernst Eberhard Kuno, Baron Langwerth von Simmern and Adolphus, Baron Barsse.) a brigade of Foot Guards under Major-General Edward Finch, and a brigade of line infantry under Major-General Edward Paget. This totalled between 12,000 and 14,000 men, and Don received his final orders on 16 October. Von der Decken planned the operation, ensuring that the force would be transported quickly to avoid the coming of the harsh northern winter that would freeze the ports and rivers necessary in disembarking the troops.

It was initially planned that Don would go ahead of his force to ensure that they would receive a positive welcome upon their landing, but this duty was instead taken by the politician Dudley Ryder, 1st Earl of Harrowby on 25 October. Harrowby's mission was to Berlin and the court of Prussia, with the intention of enticing that nation into joining the Third Coalition. He was authorised to offer a gift of £2,500,000 to ensure this. Castlereagh believed that only the wavering support of Prussia could stop Don's expedition from being successful, and by the end of October it was thought that Prussia's entry into the conflict was imminent. Pitt, in turn, was of the mind that success could bring about "Bonaparte's army either cut off or driven back to France".

== Expedition ==
=== Initial landing ===
It was expected that Don's force would sail immediately, but with the wind against them their troopships only succeeded in arriving at Cuxhaven on 19 November. The crossing was difficult, and at least five ships did not complete it, spending seventeen days at sea before returning to Harwich with a portion of the KGL cavalry still on board. The expedition went on despite this loss. A Swedish force of 10,000 men paid for by Britain was poised to attack from Stralsund, and they were joined by 20,000 Russians under Lieutenant-General Pyotr Aleksandrovich Tolstoy. The British were not the first part of the Third Coalition to enter Hanover, as a Russian force had earlier arrived to blockade Hamelin, still garrisoned by the French and the only position left to them. Despite this Don's army received a warm welcome, and they quickly secured lines of supplies, while the KGL took advantage of being back in Germany to increase their numbers with local recruits. Four infantry battalions, two of the KGL and two of line infantry, were sent to join the Russians at Hamelin, while other portions of the force were split off to go to the Ems and Weser rivers. The neutral Prussian Army had also entered French-controlled lands, south of Hanover, commanded by the Duke of Brunswick, but quickly looked for their forces to be replaced by those of the coalition.

Don's position on the continent was tenuous but not immediately threatened. Napoleon had beaten an Austrian army, that did not wait for Russian assistance before advancing, at the Battle of Ulm, but in doing so had stretched his lines of communication too far and was unable to advance further, giving time for Britain's allies to reinforce their armies. When fully organised, Don's force stretched in a line between the Weser and Verden, supported with Tolstoy's Russians to the right of him. While still not part of the Third Coalition, Prussia was on increasingly poor terms with France because of incursions made by the French into Ansbach, and Pitt hoped that Prussia would join the Coalition because of this. (Note: The Prussian minister Karl August von Hardenberg had been advocating a British occupation of Hanover since August, but the Prussian court was divided and led by the indecisive Frederick William III.) With Napoleon placed just to the south of Prussian lands, an advance by a Prussian army would put him in a very precarious situation. Realising this, Pitt decided to strengthen the British expeditionary force, hoping this would entice Prussia into more warlike actions. The diplomatic situation was complicated because Prussia also coveted Hanover, and Napoleon had offered it to Prussia in return for aggression towards Austria. Despite this difficulty, Pitt and Castlereagh were encouraged by the absence of the expected harsh winter weather and continued to move forward with their plans.

=== Expedition expanded ===
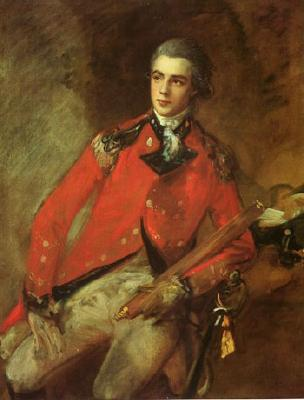
Lord Cathcart, commander of the expanded expedition

While Pitt decided on his next actions, Don began to plan an attack into the Batavian Republic alongside Tolstoy. Their plan was slowed by the reticence of the Swedish force and the continuing confusion surrounding the intentions of the Prussians. Tolstoy eventually decided that he could not invest enough men into an invasion and ensure the continued blockade of Hamelin, and no attack took place. It was afterwards decided that Don's force, then spread about, would be brought together as one field army. On 27 November this new command was given to Cathcart, who would bring 12,000 reinforcements with him to bolster his army. Don was superseded, but continued with the army as its second in command. Cathcart, who had been preparing to serve as ambassador-extraordinary to Russia and Prussia, was titled "Commander-in-Chief of British Forces in Northern Europe", and was given control over Russian, Swedish, or Prussian troops as well. Harrowby began reporting that the Prussians were inclining towards neutrality in the conflict.

Cathcart was issued his orders on 5 December, which expected him to work to the best of his abilities with the armies of the allied nations, but not endanger Hanover. Despite this aggressive step, Cathcart was also warned to take caution in his warlike manoeuvres; even if he put his army under the command of another force, such as that of Gustav IV Adolf of Sweden at Stralsund, he was allowed to refuse action if he deemed it too dangerous. Castlereagh even suggested that Cathcart attempt to link up with the main Russian army advancing from the east, but this was a logistically difficult proposition. Cathcart arrived at Cuxhaven on 15 December, making his headquarters at Bremen. He began to prepare for the upcoming campaign, discussing how to communicate if the rivers of Heligoland should freeze over, considering whether to advance on Holland or the Lower Rhine, and bringing his army together around the Weser. Before being withdrawn, the units stationed at Hamelin briefly skirmished with the defending French on 22 December, marking the only combat engaged by any of the force. (Note: Between 500 and 600 French soldiers had left Hamelin for another town, and the Anglo-Russian blockading force met them mid-way in a battle that saw 200 Frenchmen captured, and the rest forced to return to Hamelin to avoid being completely cut off from that strongpoint.) Word of the Battle of Austerlitz threw Cathcart's plans into confusion. There on 2 December a Russo-Austrian army had been soundly defeated by Napoleon, and Austria had surrendered in consequence, with both allied armies all but destroyed. The chance of Prussia entering the conflict was heavily diminished, and the remaining Russian forces began to withdraw towards Poland.

=== Offensive breaks down ===
Cathcart had come ahead of his reinforcements, and their ships only arrived in the Weser on 27 December, with two divisions under Lieutenant-Generals Francis Dundas and George Ludlow, 3rd Earl Ludlow. (Note: Cathcart was given the local rank of general while he was with the expedition.) In these were four infantry brigades, commanded by Major-Generals Rowland Hill, Sir Arthur Wellesley, Alexander Mackenzie Fraser, and John Coape Sherbrooke, with three companies of Royal Artillery and some Royal Engineers attached. The news of Austerlitz reached Britain on 28 December, but it was still hoped that Prussia would not cease fighting against France, and that Russia might hold on in the west. Without the larger Russian and Austrian armies standing as a buffer between the French forces and Cathcart's army, the latter's position in Hanover became untenable. Despite its now increasingly precarious position, Cathcart's force was kept in Hanover in the hope that its presence might still encourage the Prussians, and an uneasy cooperation with the Prussian General Friedrich Adolf, Count von Kalckreuth continued. The reinforcements in the Weser landed and joined Cathcart's army, despite there being no clear view of what they might be used for.

This injection of new troops was not the boon it might have been for Cathcart, because on top of the decaying strategic situation, the troopships had sailed through rough weather in the North Sea. Hardly any of the battalions embarked succeeded in reaching Cathcart whole; the troopship Ariadne, carrying the headquarters party and 300 men of the 9th Regiment of Foot, was wrecked near Calais and all on board were taken as prisoners of war. The same happened to half of the 5th Regiment of Foot, while losses were also encountered in the 3rd, 30th, and 89th Regiments of Foot, the latter of which lost 150 men killed and a further 150 captured. The 26th Regiment of Foot was the hardest hit in the crossing, with one troopship being wrecked on the Goodwin Sands with the loss of all on board, and another wrecked off the coast of Holland, totalling between them 500 deaths. Other units were also depleted, but not by shipwrecks, with over 1,000 men returning to Britain when ships were unable to reach their destination. Only the 28th and 36th Regiments of Foot succeeded in arriving substantially intact, but large portions of Cathcart's reinforcements were so badly depleted that they were incapable of further operations, with over 1,000 people having been killed. (Note: Around 1,000 men in total were taken prisoner from the wrecks, but they were soon exchanged in prisoner exchanges.)

Cathcart could do little with his new troops, and had further problems with the local intelligence. On 28 December Castlereagh complained that the situation in Hanover was almost unknown to him, being reliant on French and Dutch newspapers more than anything. (Note: For example, Pitt only learned of the Battle of Ulm when he was given a Dutch newspaper reporting it.) In some ways, Cathcart's army knew less than him; Wellesley reported around the same time that "they appear to have very little intelligence in this place, except what they receive from England".

=== Evacuation ===
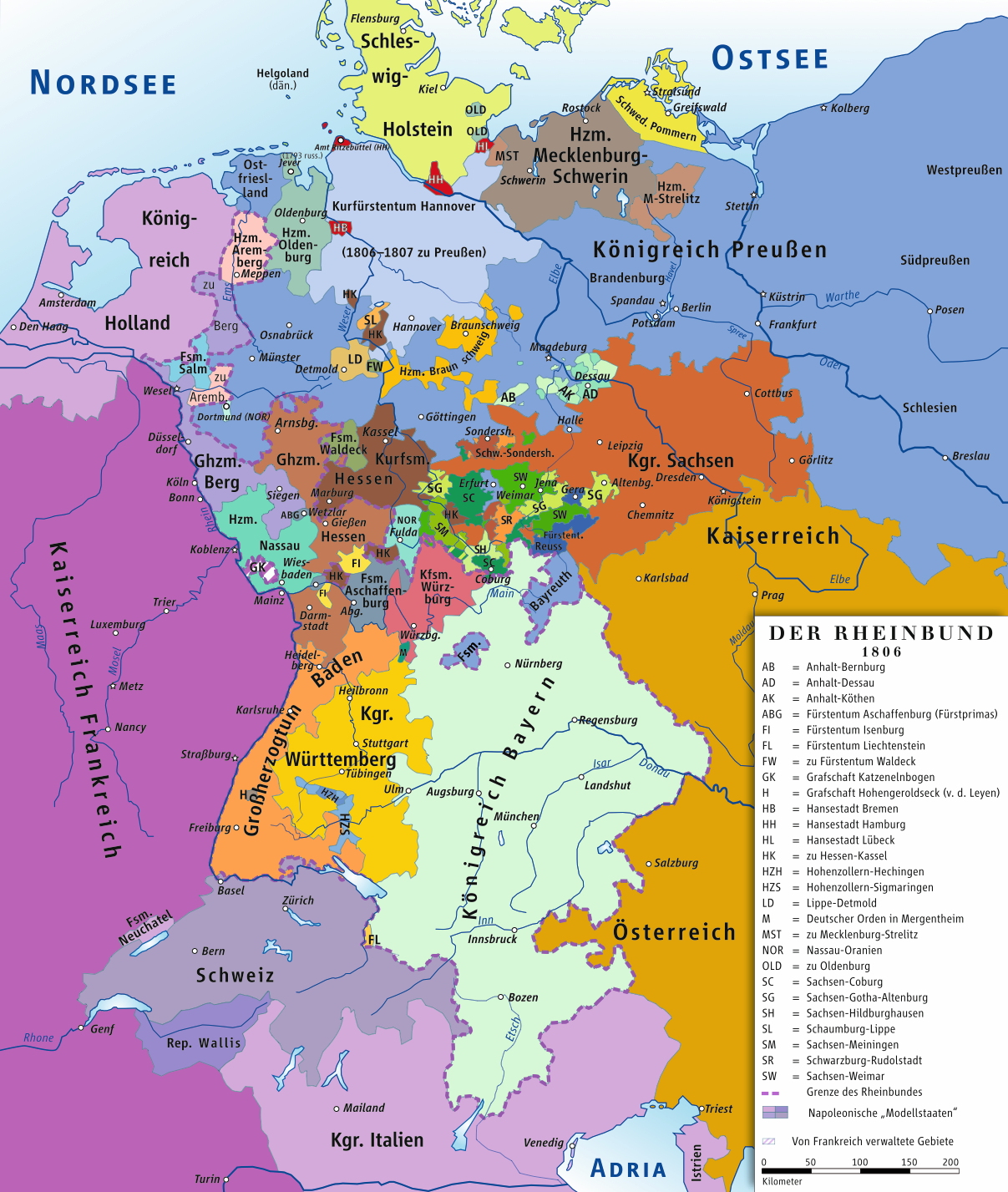
Map showing Prussia (blue) after her annexation of Hanover in January 1806

Prussian troops were still present in Hanover, dating from the period before Austerlitz when Prussia was considering more offensive actions against France. Despite Prussia being the reason for Cathcart's continued presence on the continent, he was unimpressed with them, writing that they were "strong numerically, but not in quality". Cathcart kept his army in Hanover in the hope that Russia would continue to fight and that Prussia would finally officially enter the conflict, but he also began to plan routes of retreat, expecting that if the rivers froze and they were not able to sail home, that the army could march towards Swedish Pomerania. The army continued in its positions, awaiting official instructions from Britain. By 29 December the state of Cathcart's allies was so poor that Castlereagh admitted to him that the possibility of supporting them with the British force was now completely gone.

Castlereagh was aware of Cathcart's difficulties, writing to him that he should continue to support the Russians and Prussians where possible, but that the Prussians were untrustworthy and he should not go on the offensive unless Prussian assistance was guaranteed. Prussia was also suspected of plotting to force Cathcart to leave the German soldiers of the KGL in Hanover under Prussian command. Castlereagh and Cathcart were both heavily resistant to this, and the latter ensured that in the case of an evacuation the KGL would leave first. Pitt's health was severely declining and he had retired to Bath; with the prime minister unavailable, the Cabinet began to send troopships to Cathcart in preparation for an evacuation. The remaining troopships at Ramsgate waiting to make the voyage to Hanover had their men disembarked on 30 December, and were instead sent as part of this force. On 5 January 1806 it was decided that no more troops would be sent to Hanover. Two days later it was discovered that on 14 December Prussia had ratified the Treaty of Schönbrunn, a defensive and offensive alliance with France in which Prussia was given leave to occupy Hanover. Prussia also began to withdraw Tolstoy's force, which had been left under its auspices by the retreating Alexander I of Russia. With Prussia now advancing to occupy Hanover with 50,000 men and with rumours growing that a French force of three divisions was preparing to attack from Holland, orders were sent for Cathcart to evacuate on 19 January.

Cathcart received his instructions at the end of the month, and quickly put them into effect. His army by this time had grown to 26,643 men because of recruitment by the KGL which resulted in it returning to Britain with more battalions and depots than it had left with; (Note: The KGL returned with the new 5th, 6th, and 7th Line Battalions, having left Britain with only four. Three hundred men were also recruited as the basis of the 8th Line Battalion. New heavy dragoon and light dragoon units were also formed.) only around 14,000 were British infantry. (Note: This number decreased slightly before the final embarkation, because some of the KGL were unwilling to leave their native lands.) The first to leave were the KGL and the four British battalions that had been most weakened in the crossings of the North Sea. By 12 February the last of the army had been embarked, and Cathcart left Hanover on 15 February. (Note: The army had several thousand horses with them, but were only able to take 2,300 back with them.) Von der Decken, who had served the expedition as quartermaster general to both the British and Russian forces, stayed behind to ensure that all British debts were paid. He finally returned in May.

== Aftermath ==
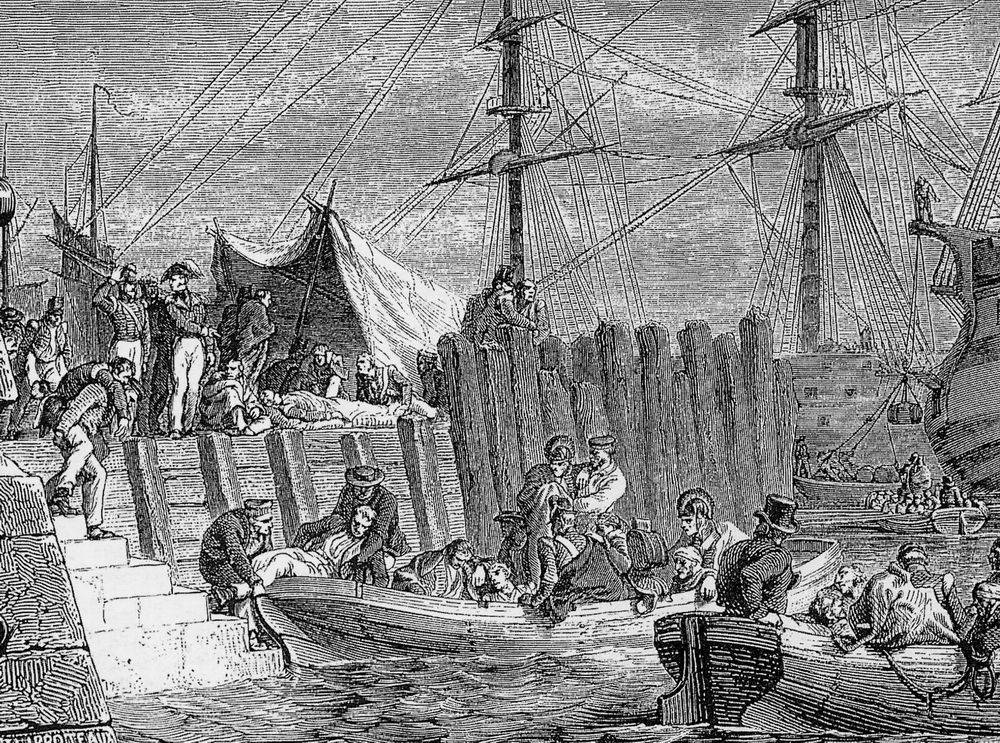
Scene from the evacuation of the Walcheren Expedition, initiated in similar form to the Hanover Expedition

With the British force gone and the Russians under Prussian control, Hanover was occupied by Prussia. In Britain, the remains of Cathcart's force were split up along the south coast of England to serve as a deterrent to invasion. Prussia was forced by France to close all its north German ports to British traffic, and this caused Britain to declare war on Prussia on 21 April. The expedition was the last military endeavour planned and orchestrated by Pitt. It had achieved nothing, but had not been a great loss of men or material, and Castlereagh would later write that he was well satisfied with Cathcart's actions, war-related losses having been minor. Some senior generals in the army were angered by the failure of the expedition, feeling that its control by civilian politicians trying to be military experts had caused its failure. Critics suggested that if the expedition had been sent to join Lieutenant-General Sir James Craig's Anglo-Russian occupation of Naples then Britain might have had one successful expedition instead of two failures. Positively, however, Hanover had shown that the navy could transport large groups of soldiers across seas at short notice, and in relatively good order barring bad weather.

Lessons were, however, not fully learned. Pitt died on 23 January, having been further weakened by the knowledge that Britain was alone in war against France, her allies defeated and the British once more pushed from the continent. His government was replaced, and future expeditions with equally poor results, such as the Walcheren Expedition, would be launched in imitation of the Hanover Expedition. Castlereagh's disposable force of 30,000 men remained in existence, but by March 1807 it had dwindled to 12,000 men, with the fleet of troopships created to assist in transporting it dispersed for other uses.

Opinions on the expedition have been varied. Atkinson argues that the failure of the expedition was the fault of Britain's allies on the continent, rather than the politicians who had ordered the endeavour. Pitt and Castlereagh had reacted quickly to the opportunity to attack Germany, and Atkinson says that the Austrians and Russians made enough mistakes that Napoleon was able to take advantage and defeat them; without them Cathcart's army could do, and did, nothing. (Note: There is debate as to whether Cathcart actually fought a small battle at a place called Munkaiser; while his Oxford Dictionary of Biography entry records this, Atkinson could find no evidence of such a battle taking place.) On the other hand, military historian Sir John Fortescue is more critical of the expedition, describing it as an "egregious farce". However, he agrees that the plan behind the expedition was sound in theory, its execution being let down by the rulers of the allied nations; while complimentary to Pitt's attempts to strike a blow against France, he is derisory of the other leaders, calling those of Russia and Sweden "insane", that of Prussia "contemptible", and Austria "weak". This need to rely on the actions of Britain's allies in order to succeed has been echoed by historian Alexander Mikaberidze. Glover writes succinctly that "[The British] had enlisted a few hundred recruits for the King's German Legion, they had offended the King of Prussia, but they had not caused Napoleon a moment's worry". The Third Coalition completed its final collapse in July 1806. Hanover remained under French control until November 1813 when it was liberated following the Battle of Leipzig.

== British Expeditionary Force ==
Hanover Expedition Order of Battle
Force	Brigade	Unit	Size at end of campaign	Ref.
Arrived with Lieutenant-General Sir George Don	Major-General Edward Paget	First Battalion, 4th Regiment of Foot	1,000+	
Arrived with Lieutenant-General Sir George Don	Major-General Edward Paget	First Battalion, 14th Regiment of Foot	1,000+	
Arrived with Lieutenant-General Sir George Don	Major-General Edward Paget	First Battalion, 23rd Regiment of Foot	794	
Arrived with Lieutenant-General Sir George Don	Major-General Edward Finch	First Battalion, Coldstream Guards	1,200+	
Arrived with Lieutenant-General Sir George Don	Major-General Edward Finch	First Battalion, Third Guards	1,200+	
Arrived with Lieutenant-General Sir George Don	Major-General Baron Linsingen	1st Heavy Dragoons (KGL)	12,075 (total)	
Arrived with Lieutenant-General Sir George Don	Major-General Baron Linsingen	2nd Heavy Dragoons (KGL)	12,075 (total)	
Arrived with Lieutenant-General Sir George Don	Major-General Baron Linsingen	1st Light Dragoons (KGL)	12,075 (total)	
Arrived with Lieutenant-General Sir George Don	Major-General Baron Linsingen	3rd Light Dragoons (KGL)	12,075 (total)	
Arrived with Lieutenant-General Sir George Don	Colonel Baron Alten	1st Light Battalion (KGL)	12,075 (total)	
Arrived with Lieutenant-General Sir George Don	Colonel Baron Alten	2nd Light Battalion (KGL)	12,075 (total)	
Arrived with Lieutenant-General Sir George Don	Colonel Baron Barsse	1st Line Battalion (KGL)	12,075 (total)	
Arrived with Lieutenant-General Sir George Don	Colonel Baron Barsse	2nd Line Battalion (KGL)	12,075 (total)	
Arrived with Lieutenant-General Sir George Don	Colonel Baron Langwerth	3rd Line Battalion (KGL)	12,075 (total)	
Arrived with Lieutenant-General Sir George Don	Colonel Baron Langwerth	4th Line Battalion (KGL)	12,075 (total)	
Arrived with Lieutenant-General Sir George Don	Units formed on expedition	5th Line Battalion (KGL)	12,075 (total)	
Arrived with Lieutenant-General Sir George Don	Units formed on expedition	6th Line Battalion (KGL)	12,075 (total)	
Arrived with Lieutenant-General Sir George Don	Units formed on expedition	7th Line Battalion (KGL)	12,075 (total)	
Arrived with Lieutenant-General Lord Cathcart	Major-General Sir Arthur Wellesley	First Battalion, 3rd Regiment of Foot	590	
Arrived with Lieutenant-General Lord Cathcart	Major-General Sir Arthur Wellesley	First Battalion, 8th Regiment of Foot	447	
Arrived with Lieutenant-General Lord Cathcart	Major-General Sir Arthur Wellesley	First Battalion, 36th Regiment of Foot	750	
Arrived with Lieutenant-General Lord Cathcart	Major-General Alexander Mackenzie Fraser	First Battalion, 26th Regiment of Foot	315	
Arrived with Lieutenant-General Lord Cathcart	Major-General Alexander Mackenzie Fraser	First Battalion, 28th Regiment of Foot	968	
Arrived with Lieutenant-General Lord Cathcart	Major-General Alexander Mackenzie Fraser	First Battalion, 91st Regiment of Foot	508	
Arrived with Lieutenant-General Lord Cathcart	Major-General John Coape Sherbrooke	First Battalion, 5th Regiment of Foot	523	
Arrived with Lieutenant-General Lord Cathcart	Major-General John Coape Sherbrooke	Second Battalion, 27th Regiment of Foot	362	
Arrived with Lieutenant-General Lord Cathcart	Major-General John Coape Sherbrooke	Second Battalion, 34th Regiment of Foot	429	
Arrived with Lieutenant-General Lord Cathcart	Major-General Rowland Hill	First Battalion, 9th Regiment of Foot	Unknown	
Arrived with Lieutenant-General Lord Cathcart	Major-General Rowland Hill	First Battalion, 30th Regiment of Foot	Unknown	
Arrived with Lieutenant-General Lord Cathcart	Major-General Rowland Hill	First Battalion, 89th Regiment of Foot	Unknown	
