= Dietrich Heinrich Ludwig von Ompteda =

Hanoverian jurist and government minister

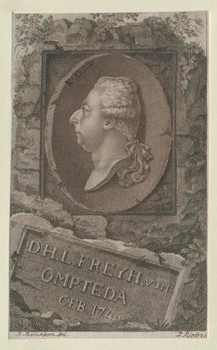
- Born: 5 March 1746; Hoya
- Died: 18 May 1803 (aged 57); Regensburg
- Other names: Dietrich Heinrich Ludwig Freiherr von Ompteda

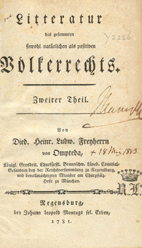
Ludwig von Ompteda Volume 2 of his Völkerrechts, 1781

Dietrich Heinrich Ludwig Freiherr von Ompteda (5 March 1746, Hoya - 18 May 1803, Regensburg) was a Hanoverian jurist and government minister.

== Life ==
Dietrich Heinrich Ludwig von Ompteda was born in 1746 on his father's estate of Wulmstorf in the Hoya region. His parents were the hofmeister and oberhauptmann Dietrich August von Ompteda and his wife, Beata Magdalena (née von Horn). After an education befitting his noble birth, he studied from 1761 to 1763 at the Ritterakademie Lüneburg with Johann Stephan Pütter, with whom he became friends and who was already studying jurisprudence at the University of Göttingen.

On successfully completing his degree, in 1767 Dietrich became ordinary assessor (Beisitzer) to the Calenberger Hofgerichtes in Hanover, rapidly rising to Hofrat in 1770, full Kriegsrat in 1774, Hofrichter to the Calenberger Hofgericht in 1778 and to Landrat and Schatzrat to the Principality of Calenberg in 1782. Aged only 37, in 1783 he became minister-plenipotentiary to the court of Charles Theodore in Munich (who as elector of the Electorate of the Palatinate also became elector of Bavaria in 1777) and diplomatic representative to the perpetual diet at Regensburg for George III (King of Great Britain and Prince-Elector of Hanover). He held both posts simultaneously until his death in Regensburg in 1803 aged 57. He also educated his nephew Christian Friedrich Wilhelm von Ompteda, later an officer in the Napoleonic Wars.

In the meantime he studied extensively and accumulated more than two thousand maps for the study of international law, a collection that was acquired two years after his death by the library of the university of Tartu. He married a baroness (freiin) von der Horst, who in 1770 wrote a French poem in honour of the celebrated founder and curator of the Göttinger Hochschule, prime minister Gerlach Adolph von Münchhausen.

== Works ==
In his 1785 two-volume magnum opus Literatur des gesamten sowohl natürlichen als positiven Völkerrechts (Literature on the entirety of international law, both natural and positive), von Ompteda significantly expanded on the system of international law begun by von Günther, which previously had only treated the laws of war and peace. Von Ompteda added a third sphere, Rechte und Verbindlichkeiten der Völker (Rights and liabilities of the peoples), which overrode the laws of war and peace and was only rarely influenced by them. In 1817, long after von Ompteda's death, Karl Albert von Kamptz added a third volume to von Ompteda's magnum opus.

Other works by von Ompteda were published anonymously, since George III was regarded as very conservative and difficult and they dealt with the jurisdiction of the Holy Roman Empire, which were sometimes drastically changed by Napoleon.

=== List ===
- Dietrich Heinrich Ludwig von Ompteda: Literatur des ges. sowohl natürlichen als positiven Völkerrechts. Regensburg 1785 (dem kursächsischen Comtialgesandten Carl Anton Friedrich Graf von Hohenthal gewidmet)
- (anonymous): Beleuchtung der unparteiischen Gedanken über Einführung des Simultaneum in Fürstenau und Schlederhaufen. Regensburg 1780,
- (anonymous): Betrachtungen über die Materie der Senate des kaiserlichen und Reichskammergerichts. Regensburg 1788,
- (anonymous): Verzeichniss deren seit Anfang gegenwärtigen Reichstages an selbigen gelangten Receß-Beschwerden gegen kaiserlichen Reichshofrath. 1788,
- Dietrich Heinrich Ludwig von Ompteda: Geschichte der vormaligen ordentlichen Gerichtskammergerichts-Visitationen und der 200 jährigen fruchtlosen Bemühungen zu deren Wiederherstellung. Regensburg 1792
- Karl Albert von Kamptz: Neue Literatur des Völkerrechts von 1784–1794, als Ergänzung und Fortsetzung des Werks des Gesandten von Ompteda. Berlin 1817

== Bibliography ==
- (in German) August Ritter von Eisenhart: Ompteda, Dietrich Heinrich Ludwig von. In: Allgemeine Deutsche Biographie (ADB). Vol 24, Duncker & Humblot, Leipzig, 1887
- (in German) Karl Otmar Freiherr von Aretin: Ompteda, Dietrich Heinrich Ludwig von. In: Neue Deutsche Biographie (NDB). Vol 19. Duncker & Humblot, Berlin, 1999
