= James Stuart (East India Company officer, died 1793) =

Major-General James Stuart
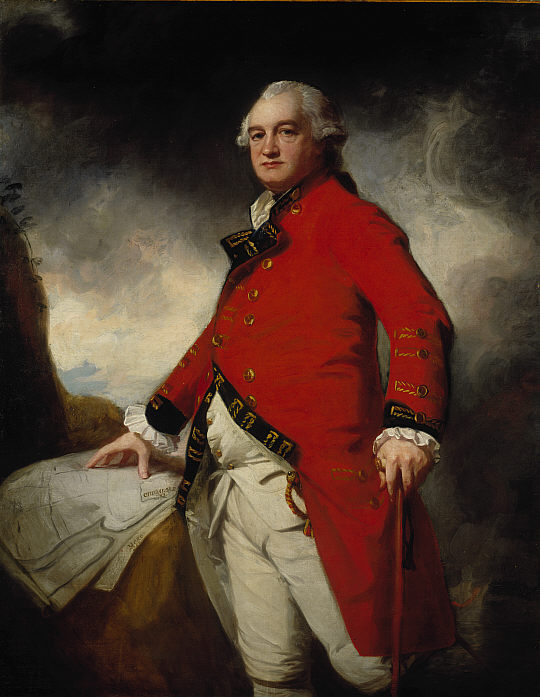
- Portrait by George Romney, c. 1786
- Died: 2 February 1793
- Military career
- Allegiance: Great Britain
- Branch: British Army
- Rank: Major-General
- Commands: Madras Army
- Conflicts: Seven Years' War; Second Anglo-Mysore War

Major-General James Stuart (died 2 February 1793) was a British Army and East India Company officer who served in various conflicts in India during the 18th century. His service in the East India Company was marked by his conflict with Lord Pigot, the governor of Madras; Stuart's arrest of the latter in 1776 resulted in his suspension as commander-in-chief, and he was not vindicated until 1780. He later fought in the Second Anglo-Mysore War, but was suspended from command in 1782 by Lord Macartney, an action that provoked a duel between the two men. Stuart was a younger brother of the lawyer and politician Andrew Stuart.

== Early service ==
Stuart was appointed captain in the 56th Regiment of Foot on 1 November 1755. He first saw active service at the siege of Louisbourg (present-day Nova Scotia) under Lord Amherst in 1758. On 9 May of the same year he was promoted to the rank of major, and in 1761 was present with Colonel Morgan's regiment at the reduction of Belle Île. During the course of the expedition he acted as quartermaster-general, and in consequence obtained the rank of lieutenant-colonel.

From Belle Île he went to the West Indies, and served in the expedition against Martinique, which was captured in February 1762, and on the death of Colonel Morgan took command of the regiment. After the conquest of Martinique his regiment was ordered to join the expedition against Havana, where he greatly distinguished himself by his conduct in the assault of the castle of Morro, the capture of which determined the success of the expedition.

== Conflict with Pigot ==
In 1775 he received permission to enter the service of the East India Company as second in command on the Coromandel Coast, with the rank of colonel. On his arrival he found serious differences existing between the council of the Madras Presidency and the governor, Lord Pigot, and on 23 August 1776 he arrested the governor at Madras, at the command of the majority of the council. On this news reaching England, Stuart was suspended by the directors from the office of commander-in-chief of the Madras Army, to which he had succeeded, with the rank of brigadier-general, on the death of Sir Robert Fletcher in December 1776.

Although he repeatedly demanded a trial, he could not, despite peremptory orders from England, succeed in obtaining a court-martial until December 1780, when he was honourably acquitted, and by order of the directors received the arrears of his pay from the time of his suspension.

== Anglo-Mysore War ==
On 11 January 1781 he was restored to the chief command in Madras by order of the governor and council. He returned to Madras in 1781, and, under Sir Eyre Coote, took part in the battle of Porto Novo on 1 July, and distinguished himself by his able handling of the second line of the British force. In the Battle of Pollilur, on 27 August, he had his leg carried away by a cannon shot. On 19 October he was promoted to the rank of major-general, and on the return of Sir Eyre Coote to Bengal he took command of the forces in Madras. Lord Macartney, the governor, however, would not allow him that freedom of action which Eyre Coote had enjoyed, and on the death of Hyder Ali on 7 December he urged him immediately to attack the Mysore army. Stuart declared his forces were not ready, and made no active movement for two months.

== Dismissal and return home ==
While besieging Cuddalore he was suspended from the command by the Madras government. He was placed in strict confinement in Madras, and sent home to England. On 8 June 1786, though unable to stand without support owing to his wounds, he fought a duel with Lord Macartney in Hyde Park, and severely wounded him. On 8 February 1792 he was appointed colonel of the 31st Foot.

He died on 2 February 1793. His portrait, painted by George Romney, was engraved by Hodges. He married Lady Margaret Hume, daughter of Hugh Hume-Campbell, 3rd Earl of Marchmont, but had no children.

Military offices
New regiment	Lieutenant-Colonel of the 97th Regiment of Foot; 1761–1762	Succeeded by James Forrester
Preceded by Thomas Clarke	Colonel of the 31st (Huntingdonshire) Regiment of Foot; 1792–1793	Succeeded by The Lord Mulgrave
