= Charles, Count Alten =

Hanoverian army officer and politician

Sir Charles August von Alten
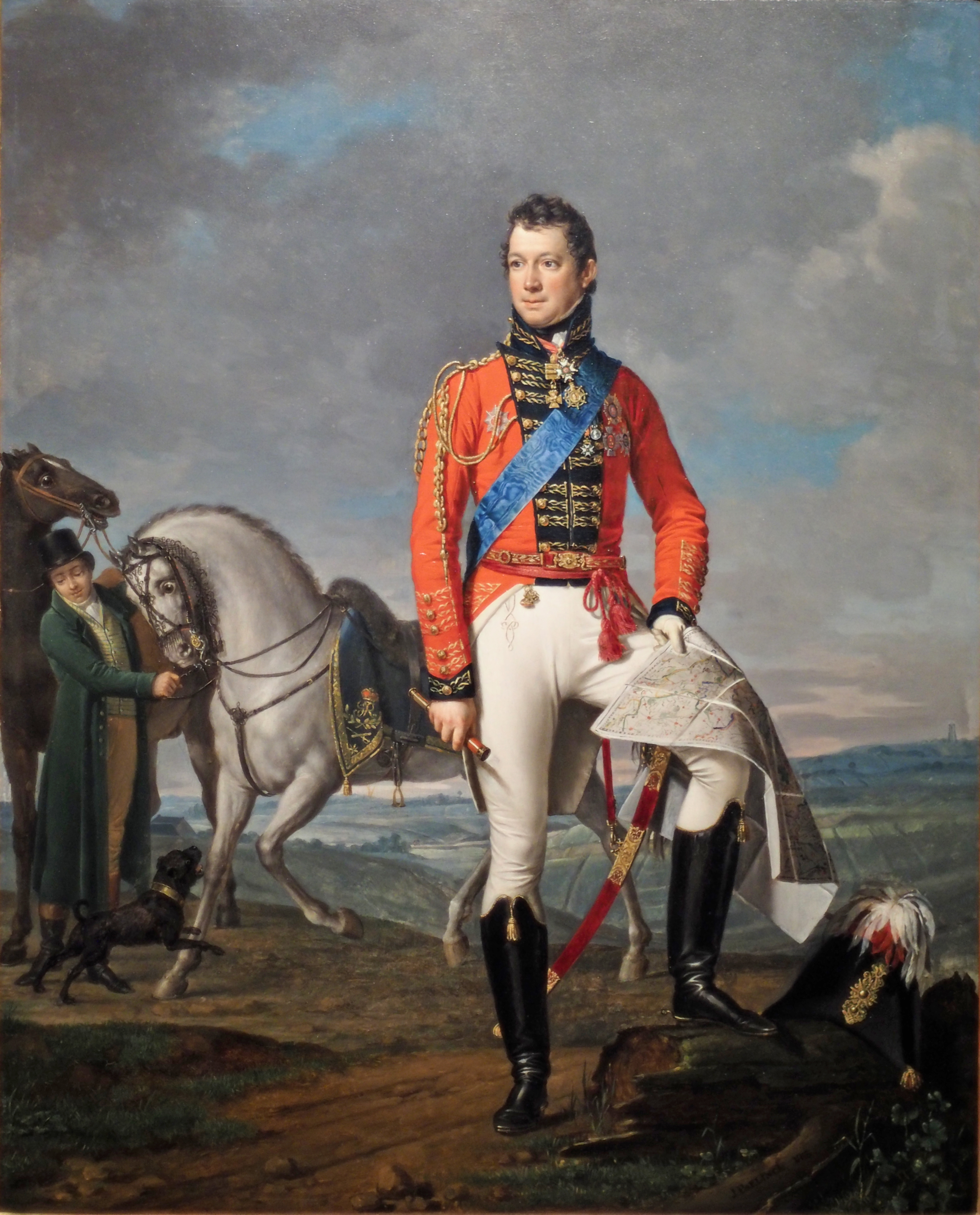
- Portrait by Joseph Paelinck, 1818
- Born: Carl August von Alten; 21 October 1764; Burgwedel, Duchy of Brunswick-Lüneburg
- Died: 20 April 1840 (aged 75); Bozen, County of Tyrol
- Military career
- Allegiance: Electorate of Hanover; United Kingdom; Kingdom of Hanover
- Branch: Hanoverian Army; British Army
- Service years: 1781–1840
- Rank: General field marshal (Hanoverian Army)
- Commands: Light Division; King's German Legion
- Conflicts: Napoleonic Wars; Peninsular War; Battle of Albuera; Hundred Days; Battle of Quatre Bras; Battle of Waterloo
- Awards: Knight Grand Cross of the Order of the Bath; Knight Grand Cross of the Royal Guelphic Order

Sir Charles August von Alten GCB, GCH (21 October 1764 – 20 April 1840), better known as Charles, Count Alten, was a Hanoverian army officer and politician who led the Light Division during the last two years of the Peninsular War. At the Battle of Waterloo, he commanded an Anglo-Hanoverian division in the front line, where he was wounded. He later rose to the rank of Field Marshal in the Hanoverian Army.

Alten was the son of August Eberhard von Alten (1722–1789), a member of an old Hanoverian family, and Baroness Henriette Philippine Marie Hedwig von Vincke-Ostenwalde. Alten's older brother, Victor Alten (1755–1820) commanded a cavalry brigade in Wellington's army. Unlike his brother Charles, Victor is described as "unsatisfactory".

== Early career ==
Alten entered the service of the elector as a page at the age of twelve.

In 1781 he received a commission in the Hanoverian guards, and as a captain took part in the campaigns of 1793–1795 in the Low Countries, distinguishing himself particularly on the Lys in command of light infantry. In 1803 the Hanoverian Army was disbanded, and Alten took service with the King's German Legion (KGL) of the British Army. In command of the KGL's light infantry, he took part with Lord Cathcart in the Hanover Expedition of 1805. He also fought at Copenhagen in 1807.

== Peninsular War ==
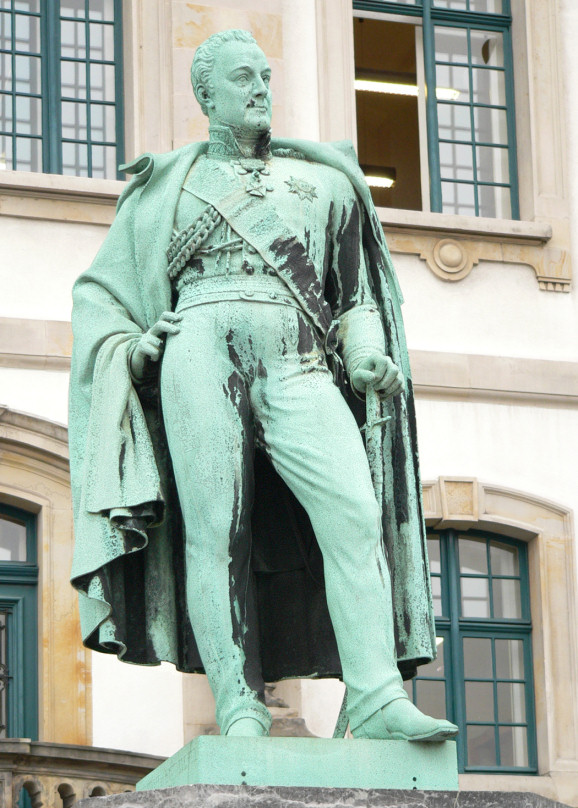
Statue in Hannover, Germany (Sculptor: Heinrich Kümmel).

Alten was with John Moore in Sweden and Spain. He commanded the 2nd Flank Brigade in Moore's campaign though he missed the Battle of Corunna. He participated in the disastrous Walcheren expedition in the summer of 1809. He was soon employed once more in the Peninsula, and at the Battle of Albuera he commanded an independent KGL brigade. An incident in the battle highlights both the abilities and the limitations of Alten.

Alten was ordered to evacuate Albuera village, which could be retaken by the Portuguese as soon as they could arrive, and move up the ridge to reinforce the dwindling line. The order was carried by a Portuguese ADC and Alten, a good and conscientious Hanoverian soldier, believed that it must have been distorted in transmission. He refused to move until relieved by the Portuguese.

In April 1812 Arthur Wellesley, Viscount Wellington placed him at the head of the famous Light Division, which consisted of the 1/43rd and 1/52nd Light Infantry, 95th Rifles, and 1st and 3rd Portuguese Caçadores. In this post he worthily continued the records of Moore and Robert Craufurd at the battles of Salamanca, Vitoria, the Pyrenees, the Nivelle, the Nive, Orthez and Toulouse. His officers presented him with a sword of honour as a token of their esteem. Wellington called Alten, "the best of the Hanoverians". Comparing him with Craufurd, Charles Oman writes:

Charles Alten, [Craufurd's] successor in command of the Light Division being a general of much more pedestrian quality, who might never fail to make an attempt to obey Wellington's orders to the best of his ability, but could never supplement them by any improvisation of his own, of which he was incapable.

== Waterloo and later career ==
In 1815 Alten led Wellington's 3rd Division during the Hundred Days. This command included Maj-Gen Colin Halkett's 5th British Brigade, Col Christian Ompteda's 2nd KGL Brigade and Maj-Gen Friedrich Kielmansegge's 1st Hanoverian Brigade. Parts of the division were heavily engaged at the Battle of Quatre Bras. At the Battle of Waterloo, the 3rd Division held the front line throughout the day and suffered very heavy losses. Severely wounded in the battle, Alten's conduct won for him the rank of Count von Alten.

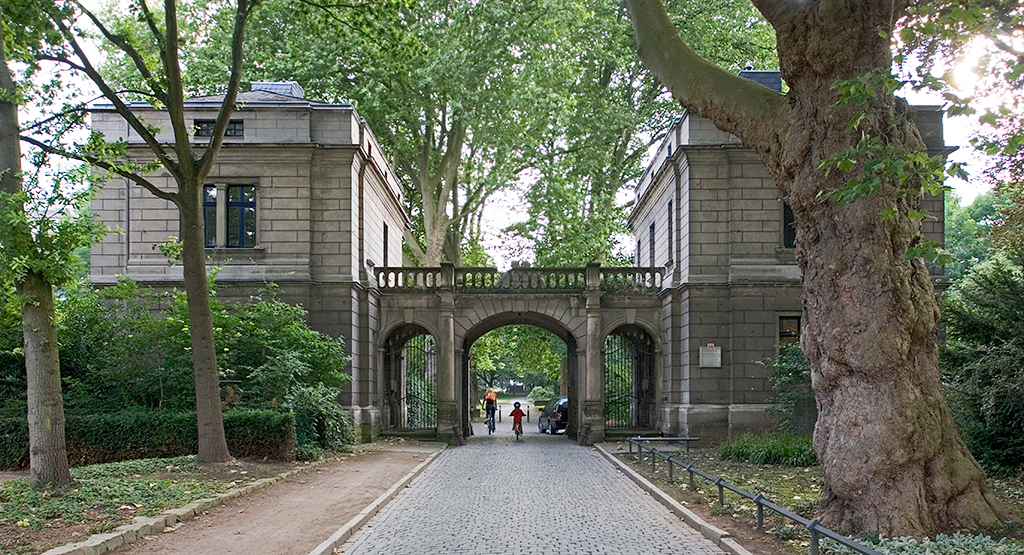
The von-Alten-garden in Hanover on the grounds of his former house

When the King's German Legion ceased to exist, Alten was given the command of the Hanoverians in France. In 1818 he returned to Hanover, where he subsequently became minister of war and foreign affairs, and rose to the rank of Field Marshal. At the same time, he was retained on the British Army List as Major-General Sir Charles Alten, GCB. He died in 1840. A memorial to Alten has been erected at Hanover. He is buried in the Neustädter Kirche.

== Sources ==
- Burnham, Robert; McGuigan, Ron (2017). Wellington's Brigade Commanders: Peninsula and Waterloo. Pen & Sword Military. ISBN 9781473850828.
- Chisholm, Hugh, ed. (1911). "Alten, Sir Charles". Encyclopædia Britannica. Vol. 1 (11th ed.). Cambridge University Press.
- Glover, Michael (1974). The Peninsular War 1807–1814. Penguin Books. ISBN 0-7153-6387-5. OCLC 1285750987. OL 7359864M.
- McGuigan, Ron (November 2011) [October 2007]. "British Generals of the Napoleonic Wars 1793-1815:Alten, Victor Baron". The Napoleon Series.
- Oman, Charles (1993) [1913]. Wellington's Army, 1809–1814. London: Greenhill. ISBN 0-947898-41-7.
