= Hanoverian Army =

Standing army of the historic Kingdom of Hanover

The Flag of Hanover.

The Hanoverian Army (German: Hannoversche Armee) was the standing army of the Electorate of Hanover from the seventeenth century onwards. From 1692 to 1803 it acted in defence of the electorate. Following the Hanoverian Succession of 1714, this was in conjunction with the British Army with which it shared a monarch. Hanoverian troops fought in the War of the Austrian Succession, Seven Years' War and American War of Independence during the eighteenth century.

After Napoleon's invasion and incorporation of Hanover into the Confederation of the Rhine in 1803, many exiled members of the army served in Britain's King's German Legion. In 1813 the Hanoverian Army was reformed under Prince Adolphus, Duke of Cambridge and took part in the final defeat of Napoleon at the Battle of Waterloo. Following the Congress of Vienna, Hanover was elevated into a kingdom. It continued to be directly tied to Britain until 1837 when, after the death of William IV, Hanover's Salic Law led it to crown Ernest Augustus in preference to his niece Queen Victoria. The Hanoverian Army was defeated in 1866 during the Austro-Prussian War and Hanover's independence ended. Hanoverian troops were subsequently incorporated into the Imperial German Army.

The symbol of the army, incorporated into many of its uniforms and banners, was the White Horse of Hanover. The term "Hanoverian Army" is also sometimes used after 1714 to refer to British forces supportive of the House of Hanover against their Jacobite opponents, particularly during the 1715 and 1745 Jacobite Risings. The term Army of Hanover may refer to a French military formation centred on Hanover during the Napoleonic Wars.

== Background ==
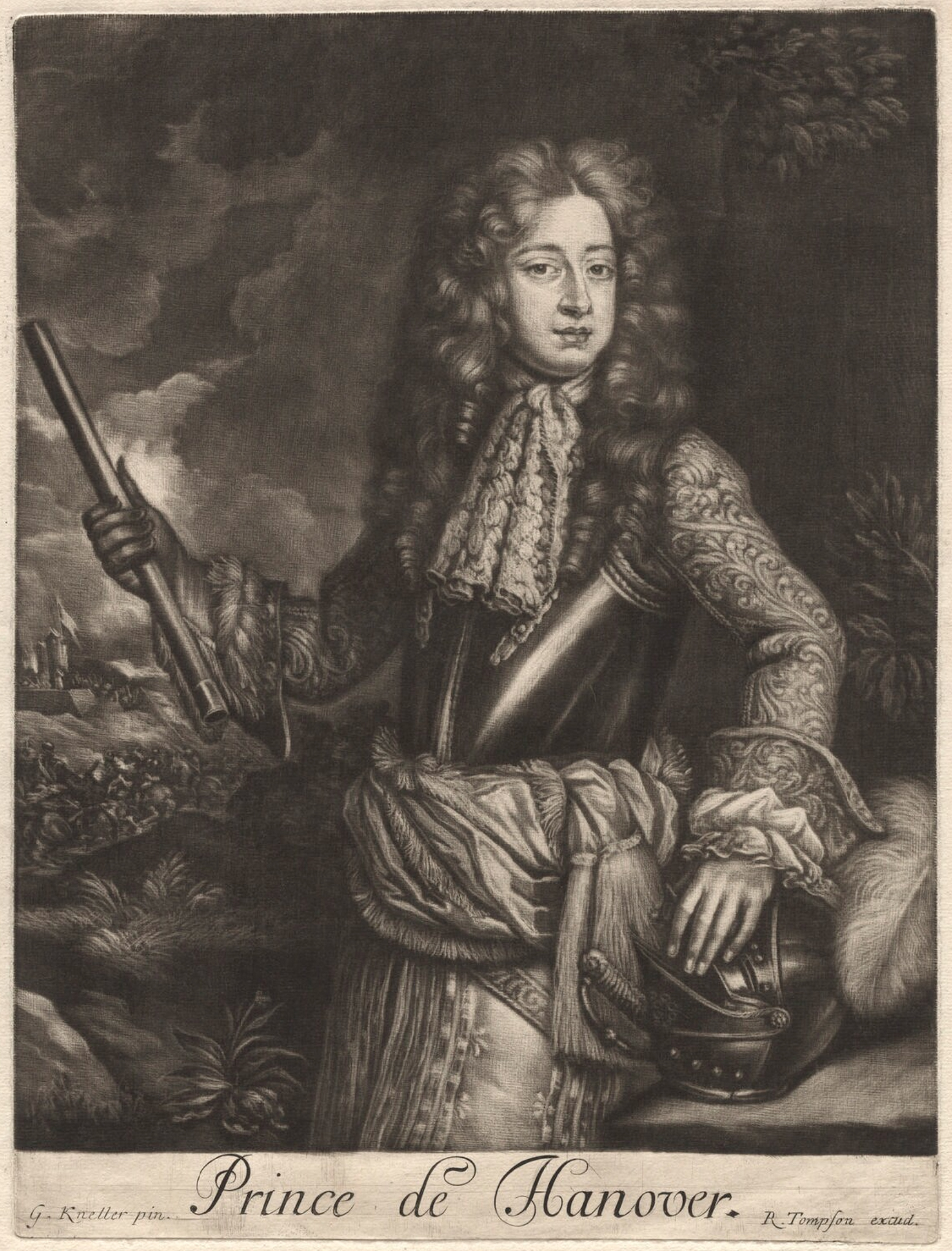
George, Prince of Hanover led Hanoverian troops during the Siege of Vienna (1683).

The Guelph family had a long history in the Holy Roman Empire. By the seventeenth century a branch of the family reigned over territories in Northern Germany centred around the city of Hanover, at a lesser level to the Electors who elected the Emperors.

From Hanover the ambitious Ernest Augustus incorporated various hereditary possessions into a larger, single state. Through his wife Sophia his children also acquired a distant claim to the English, Scottish and Irish thrones as descendants of James VI and I. The family further consolidated their possessions when Ernest Augustus's son George married his cousin Sophia Dorothea in 1682. The following year George commanded Hanoverian troops that took part in the successful defeat of Turkish forces at the Siege of Vienna. In these years an increasing professionalism marked out the Hanoverian troops, alongside those of another northern Protestant state Brandenburg-Prussia.

The military support given by Ernest Augustus to the Emperor Leopold I saw Hanover promoted to effective electoral status in 1692, although this was not fully confirmed by the Imperial Diet until 1708. From 1689 Hanover was a significant part of the Grand Alliance formed to check the expansion of Louis XIV, which fought French armies to a standstill in a series of campaigns leading to the Treaty of Ryswick. In 1698 Ernest Augustus died, and his son George succeeded him. As well as his multiple German family alliances, George also had a now strong claim to the British throne through his mother due to his Protestant religion which excluded rival Jacobite claimants.

== War of the Spanish Succession ==
In 1701, the Act of Settlement passed in the Parliament of England backing the House of Hanover, and from 1702 they were considered direct successors of Queen Anne. This brought the Hanoverian forces closer to their British allies, particularly after the outbreak of the War of the Spanish Succession in 1702 where they both fought against Louis XIV's French forces. During the war, an estimated 16,000 troops raised by Hanover were paid for subsidies by Britain and the Dutch Republic.

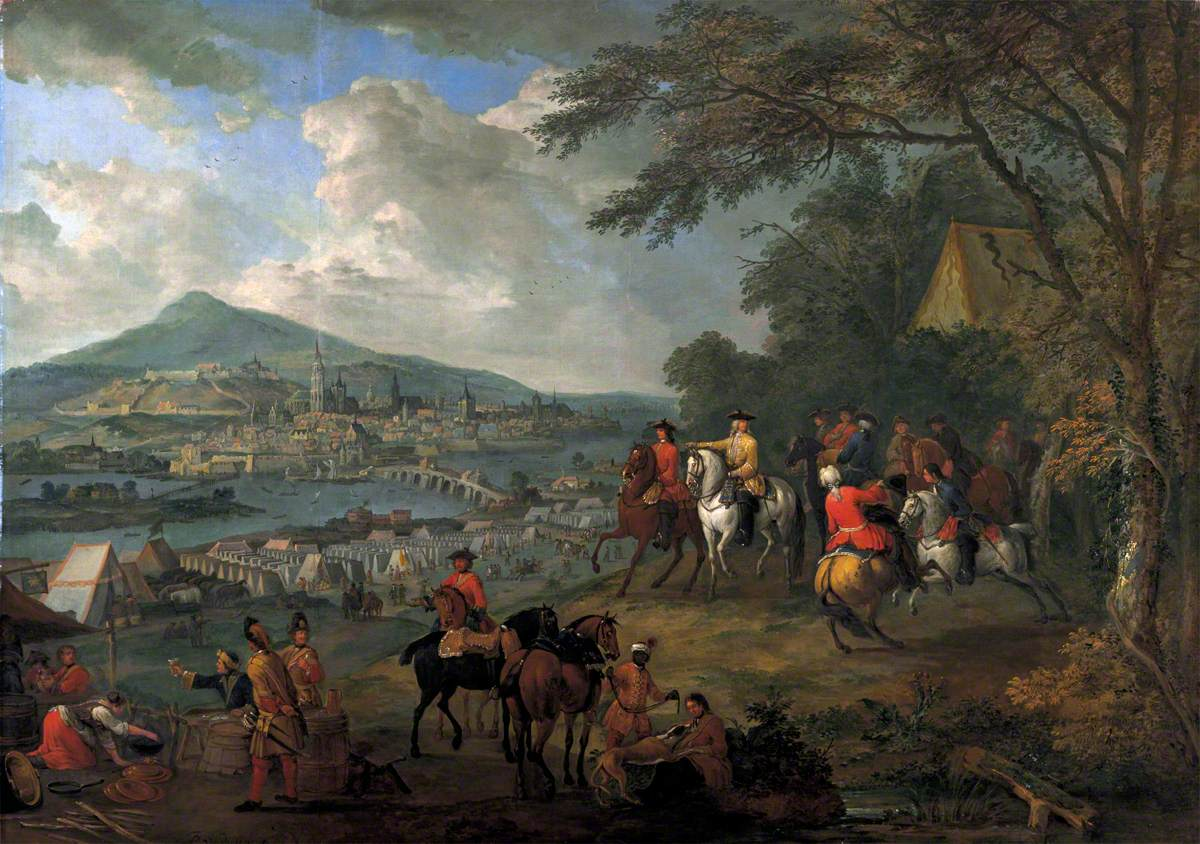
Under the Elector's son Prince George, Hanoverian troops played a major part in Marlborough's major victory at the Battle of Oudenarde in 1708.

Early in the war George oversaw an invasion of Brunswick a smaller, pro-French neighbouring state. Hanover despatched a contingent to serve in the Allied Army under John Churchill, 1st Duke of Marlborough, taking part in numerous campaigns including the decisive victory at Blenheim. Hanoverian hopes that George might become commander of the Allied coalition were unfulfilled. In 1707 he was promoted to Imperial Field Marshal and given command of the Imperial forces along the Rhine, having been praised for his actions against Marshal Villars at the head of his Hanoverian forces.

At a strategy conference held in Hanover April 1708, George believed that he had persuaded Marlborough and Prince Eugene of Savoy to use their armies in Flanders as a feint to tie down French troops while he launched the main assault on the Rhine. However he had been deliberately misled and in fact Marlborough used the threat of George's Imperial army as a diversion to support his own offensive, leading to his victory at the Battle of Oudenarde and the capture of Lille. Hanoverian troops took part at Oudernade with George's son George Augustus distinguishing himself in the fighting.

Although George was frustrated by the inactivity on the Rhine, he was still pleased by the Allied victories. His further ambitious plans for the following year involved a drive into Franche-Comté where it was believed a significant part of the population was opposed to Louis XIV. Once again George's plans were frustrated, as the Emperor Joseph I in Vienna diverted away troops and crucial resources to other theatres and he was left with too few men to take the offensive. Unwilling to continue after the problems of the 1709 campaign he resigned as commander of the army, and retired from active military service.

Hanoverian contingents continued to serve to the end of the war. In 1712 they refused an order by their new British commander Ormonde to march away to Dunkirk and remained to support Prince Eugene in his unsuccessful Battle of Denain and the Rhine campaign of 1713. Due to the withdrawal of British subsidies, Hanoverian forces fought on at their own expense until the Treaty of Baden (1714) brought a final end to the war.

== Union with Britain ==
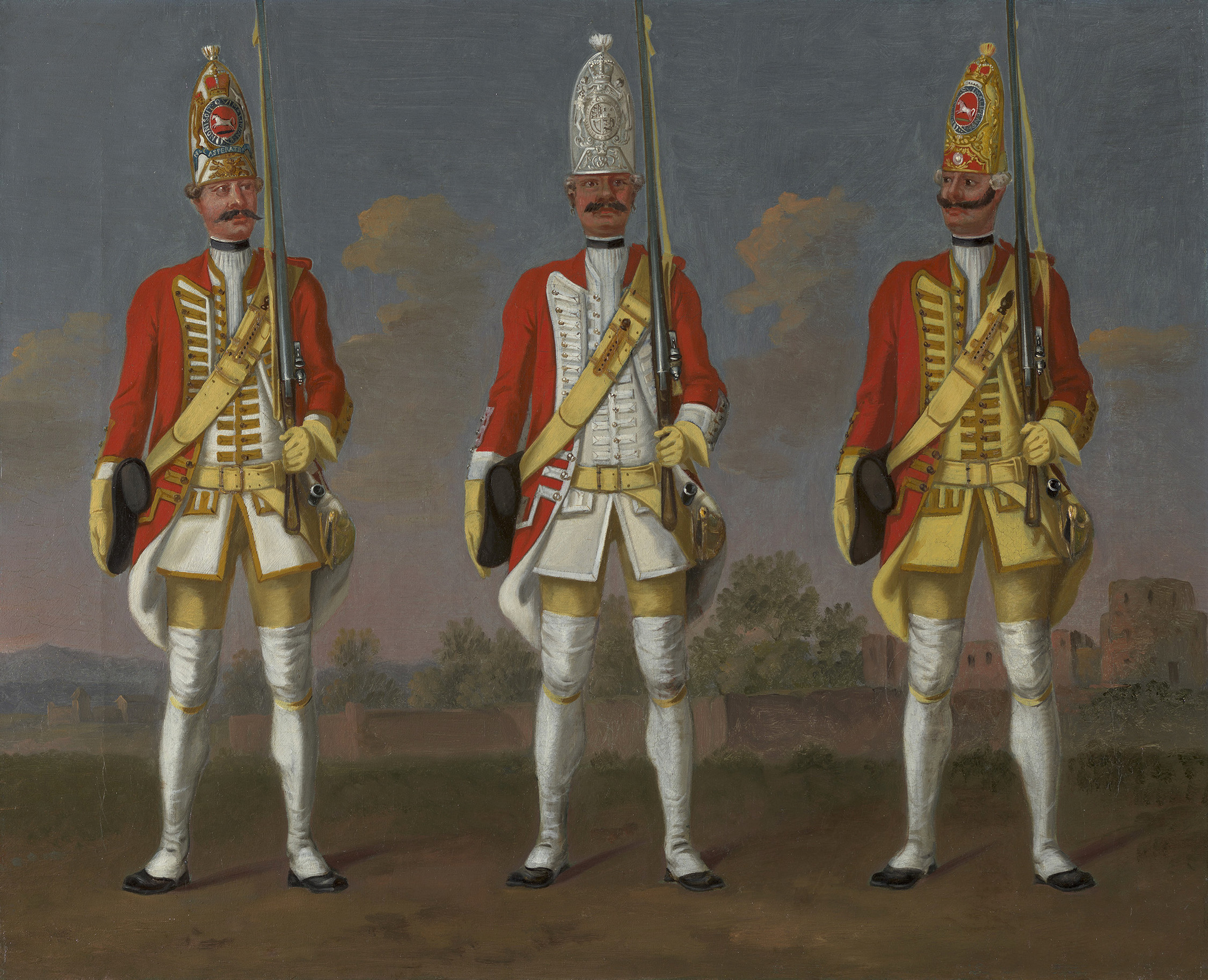
c. 1752 painting of three Hanoverian Army grenadiers

As Queen Anne grew increasingly ill in 1713–14, Hanoverian supporters moved to secure the succession to the British throne. The rival claimant James Stuart and his Jacobite supporters appeared ready to contest the crown. George issued Marlborough with a warrant to command British troops in the event of Anne's death, which would be reinforced by Hanoverian and Dutch troops. In the event the Hanoverian Succession passed off without major incident and was secured by British troops alone. The Jacobite rebellion that broke out the following year was defeated largely by British troops. The succession created a personal union between Hanover and Britain, and brought the Hanoverian Army into a fixed alliance with their British counterparts.

Despite inheriting the throne of the larger Britain, George remained fixated on the electorate, and particularly wanted to advance Hanover's claims in the Great Northern War against Sweden. Over time the engagement of British troops in support of Hanoverian goals became controversial in Britain and came under attack from the Patriot Whigs, while in Hanover there was a broad acceptance of subordinating the Hanoverian Army to Britain's foreign policy.

In 1719 during the War of the Quadruple Alliance with Spain, Jacobites attempted to launch another invasion of Britain. Although Hanoverian units were a significant part of the plan to defend Britain's coasts, bad weather stalled the main invasion and the diversionary attack on Scotland was defeated by local forces at the Battle of Glenshiel. Peace was agreed by the Treaty of The Hague in 1720.

== War of the Austrian Succession ==
When the War of Jenkins' Ear broke out between Britain and Spain in 1740, Hanover was not directly involved. This changed when Charles VI of Austria died in October of the same year. George II, as elector of Hanover and king of Great Britain, took different positions for his respective realms. As elector of Hanover he agreed a treaty of neutrality with France and cast his vote in favour of their successful candidate Charles Albert of Bavaria, while Britain staunchly supported the new ruler of Austria, Maria Theresa, who was attacked from several directions, including by George II's Prussian nephew Frederick II who annexed Silesia.

In response Britain forged a coalition to support Maria Theresa and hired nearly 16,000 Hanoverian troops to serve in the Pragmatic Army assembled in the Low Countries. They also employed Hessian troops, from the neighbouring Hesse-Kassel which had strong traditional ties to Hanover through marriage and military alliance. The Hanoverian Army fought at the battles of Fontenoy and Lauffeld among others. At the Battle of Dettingen the Anglo-Hanoverian forces were commanded by George II, the last British monarch to lead his troops on the battlefield. A landing by Charles Edward Stuart in Scotland launched a fresh Jacobite rising led to the redeployment of British and allied German troops to counter the threat, which was largely ended at the Battle of Culloden in 1746.

== Seven Years' War ==
During the Seven Years War, the Hanoverian Army would participate in numerous battles. In 1757, the French army defeated the Hanoverian Army at Hastenbeck.

== Aftermath ==
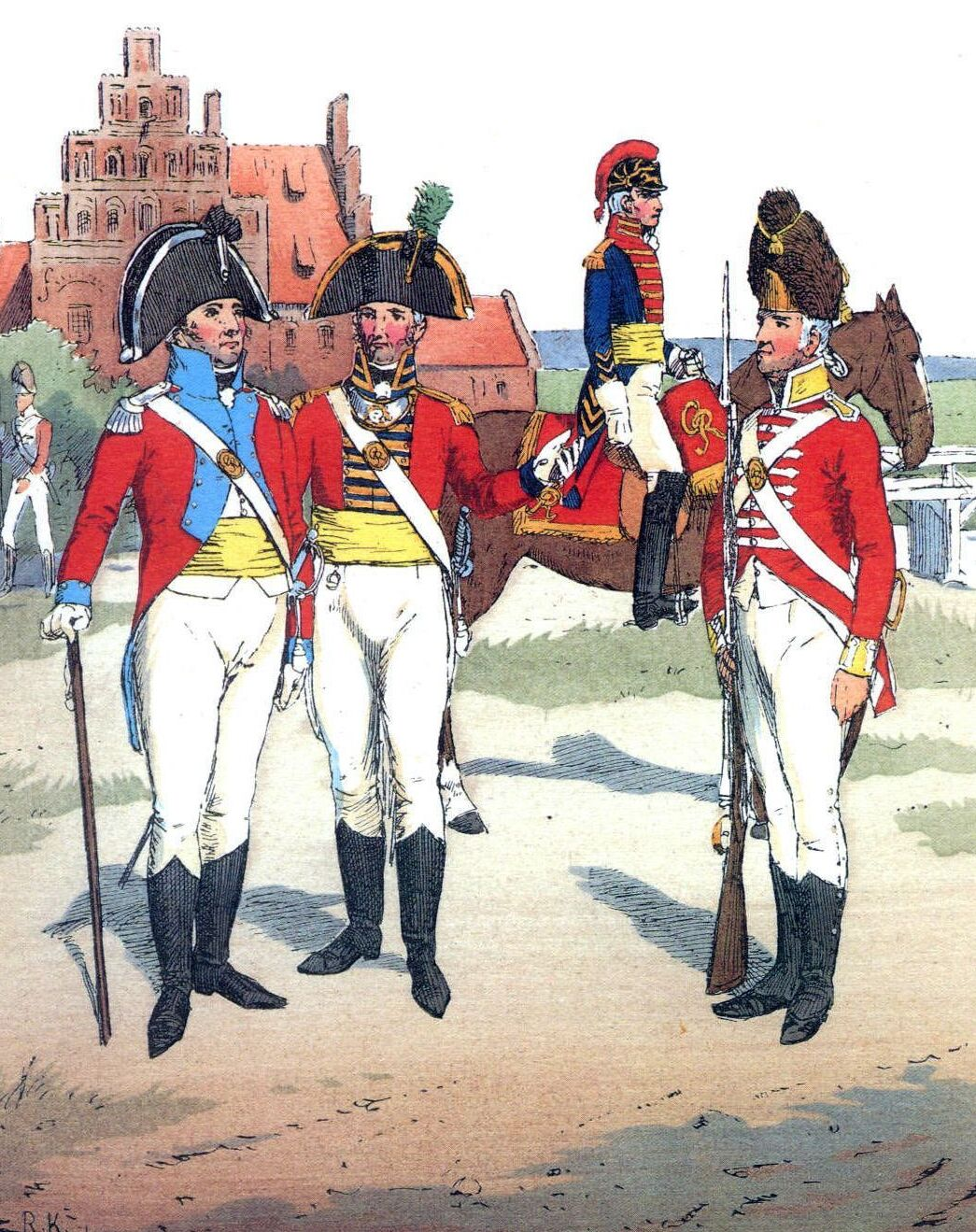
Hanoverian troops in 1802

After the fall of the Electorate in 1803 and the dissolution of the Holy Roman Empire the Hanoverian Army discontinued, although Hanoverian exiles formed the nucleus of the King's German Legion.

From 1814 the army of the Kingdom of Hanover was known as the Royal Hanoverian Army, (Note: Oman (1913) wrote: "After the peace of 1814 all the 'mongrels' were discharged, and the officers and native-born Hanoverian rank and file became the nucleus on which the new Royal Army of Hanover was built up.") which was subsumed into the Prussian Army after Hanover was annexed in 1866.

== Sources ==
- Black, Jeremy (2005). The Continental Commitment: Britain, Hanover and Interventionism 1714–1793. Routledge. doi:10.4324/9780203013120. ISBN 9780415362924. LCCN 2005000923. OCLC 252743456. OL 3392064M.
- Chisholm, Hugh, ed. (1911). "Hanover (province)" . Encyclopædia Britannica. Vol. 12 (11th ed.). Cambridge University Press. p. 926.
- Field, Andrew W (2022). Wellington's Waterloo Allies: How Soldiers from Brunswick, Hanover, Nassau and the Netherlands Contributed to the Victory of 1815. Pen and Sword Military.
- Hatton, Ragnihild (1978). George I: Elector and King. Thames and Hudson.
- Newman, Gerald; Brown, Leslie Ellen (1997). Britain in the Hanoverian Age, 1714–1837: An Encyclopedia. Taylor & Francis.
- Oman, Charles (1913). "XIII The Auxiliaries: The Germans and the Portuguese". Wellington's Army, 1809–1814. London: Edward Arnold – via Project Gutenberg.
- Smith, Hannah (2006). Georgian Monarchy: Politics and Culture, 1714–1760. Cambridge University Press.
- Thomson, Andrew C (2006). Britain, Hanover and the Protestant Interest, 1688–1756. Boydell Press.
