= Von der Decken =

von der Decken is a surname. Notable people with the surname include:

- von der Decken family, a German noble family
- Georg von der Decken (1836–1898), German politician (DHP), grandson of Johann Friedrich von der Decken
- Johann Friedrich von der Decken (1769–1840), Hanoverian general and diplomat
- Karl Klaus von der Decken (1833–1865), German explorer of eastern Africa
- Kerstin von der Decken (born 1968), German politician (CDU)
- Leopold von der Decken (1895–1947), changed his name to John Decker, painter in Los Angeles, grandson of Georg von der Decken
