= Von der Decken family =

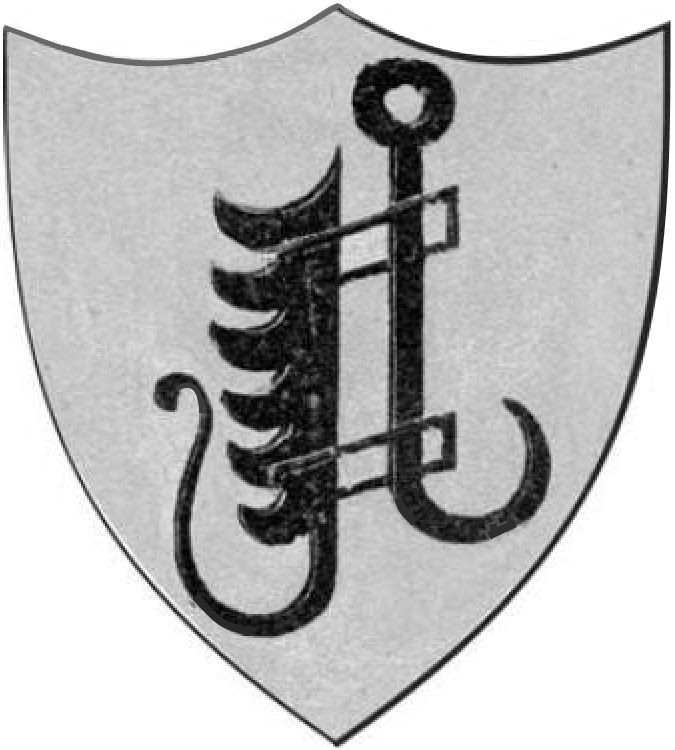
The coat of arms of the von der Decken family is a fireplace trammel hook.

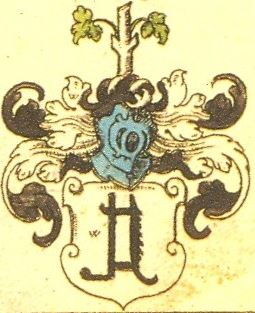
von der Decken coat of arms at Siebmachers Wappenbuch by Johann Siebmacher 1605, there on p. 181.

The von der Decken family is an ancient Hanoverian family of German nobility. Since more than 750 years the center of the family is in a part of Lower Saxony at the south bank of the river Elbe called Kehdingen.

== History ==
=== The Origin of the Family ===
The first documented members of the family are Alverik and Herewart von Decca. About 1250 they were vassals of Frederick of Haseldorf. The genealogy of the family can be traced back to Nicolaus de Deken. He was a squire and lived from about 1290 to 1360. The first von der Deckens lived near Freiburg, Lower Saxony, at the southern bank of the Elbe river.

=== Five Lines of the Family ===
All living von der Deckens are descendants of Claus von der Decken, who died in 1541. He was a mayor of Stade and had eight children. Five of his sons started the different lines of the family (see Genealogy of the von der Decken family).

=== The von der Deckens in South Africa ===
Adolphus (1834–1886) is a son of Adolph Melchior (1806–1862). They are descendants of the Oerichsheil line. For Adolph Melchior and Adolphus see Extract of genealogical table of the family von der Decken 1. Line in German language. Adolphus emigrated 1855 first to England and later to South Africa. He settled near King Williams Town. Adolphus married in 1855 Emma Louisa Eustace, when he was 21 and she was 19 years old. There are many descendants of Adolphus and Emma living in South Africa. Some of them with the name von der Decken live in King William's Town, in Fort Beaufort and near to Durban.

== Coat of arms ==
The coat of arms shows a fireplace trammel hook. On the helmet with black and silver covers is standing a natural short oak branch with hanging green leaves on both sides.

=== Historic coat of arms ===
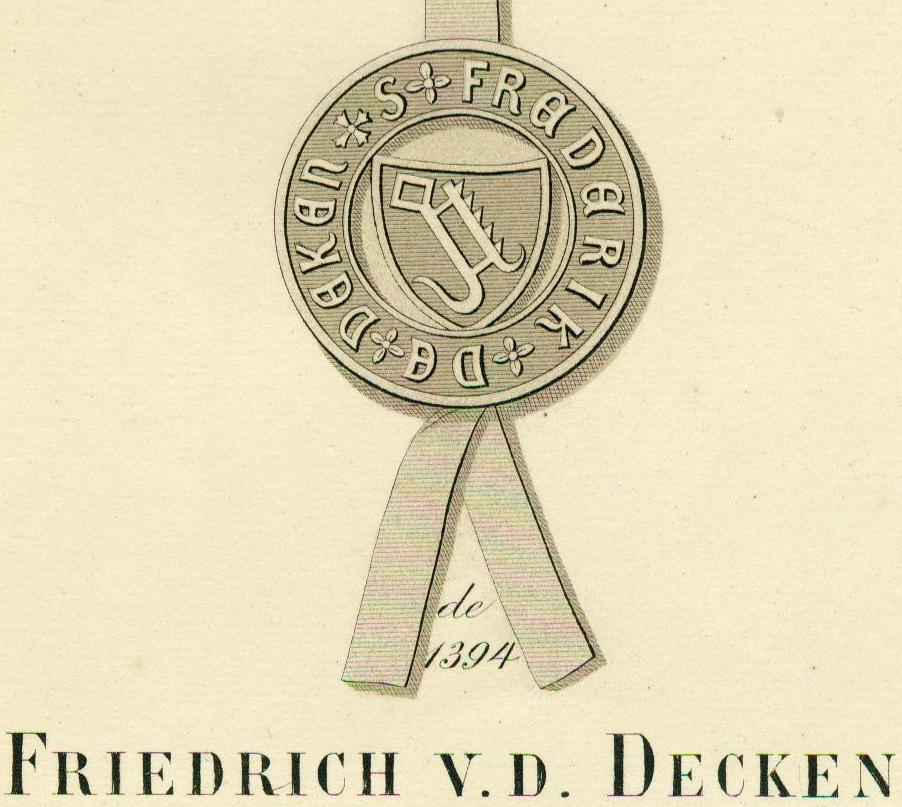
Seal of Friedrich von der Decken noted as Zackewolde in a document dated 1394. This is the oldest seal of the family. (copied).

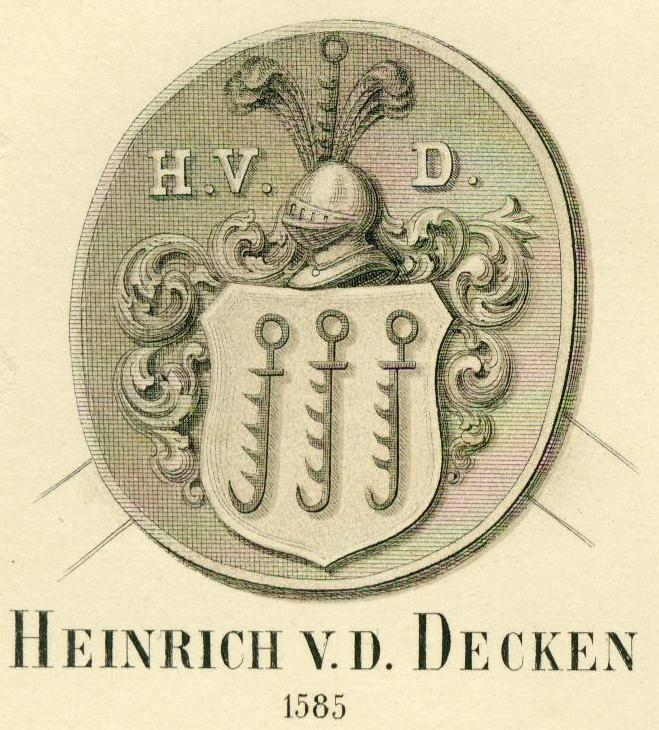
Seal of Heinrich von der Decken of the year 1585. He had three trammel hooks in his coat of arms and lived until 1590. Heinrich was alderman and mayor of the town Stade. He had farms in Götzdorf north of Stade and Aschhorn near Drochtersen. He belonged to the extinct line in the town of Stade. (copied)

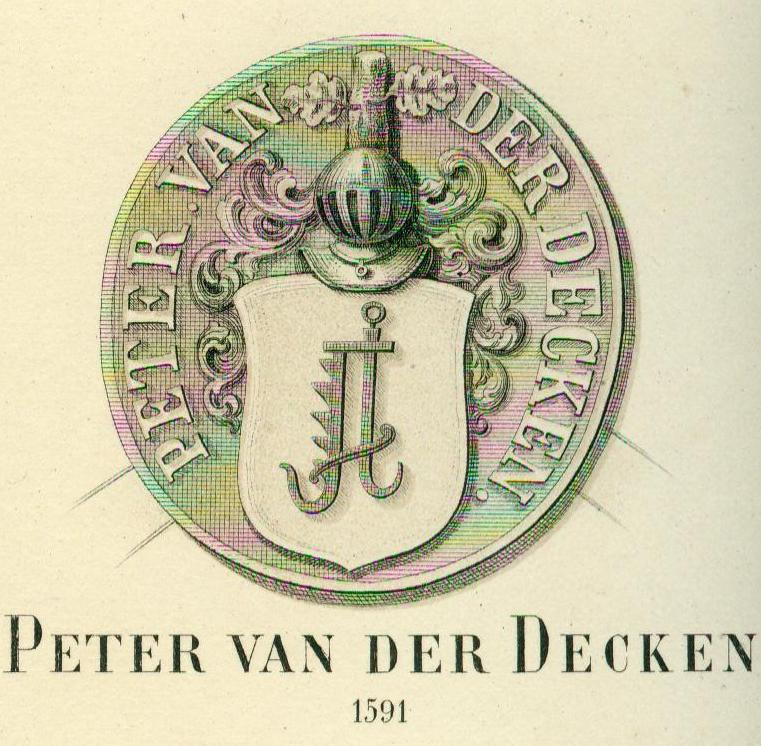
Seal of Peter von der Decken from the year 1591. Peter lived from 1539 to 1619. He is the son of Hermann. Hermann was a mayor of Stade and he started the first family line. Peter owned the farms: Kampe, Oerichsheil, Ritterhof and Wechtern. This style of the coat of arms from 1591 stayed until present.

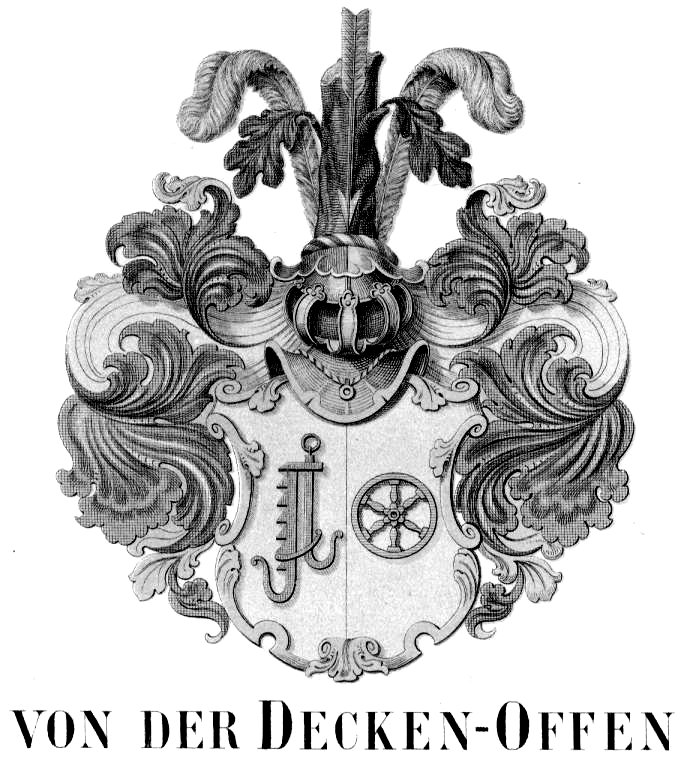
Since 1732 the coat of arms of the third line is a conjunction of the two families von der Decken and von Offen. The coat of arms of the family von Offen is a red wheel with six spokes on a silver ground. The title Freiherr in the third line stayed for two generations from 1885 to 1969.

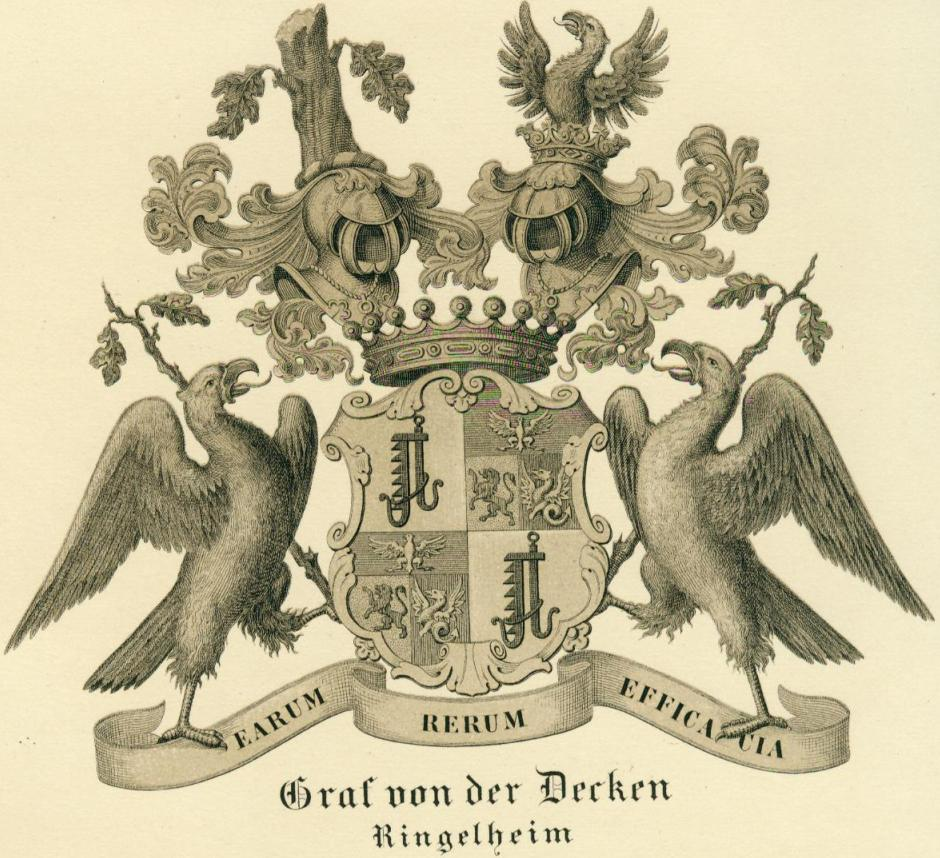
Count Johann Friedrich von der Decken bought Ringelheim in 1817. In 1833 he was honored with the title Graf. The title continues with agnatic primogeniture and Salic law like the order of succession in the House of Hanover and in the House of Liechtenstein.

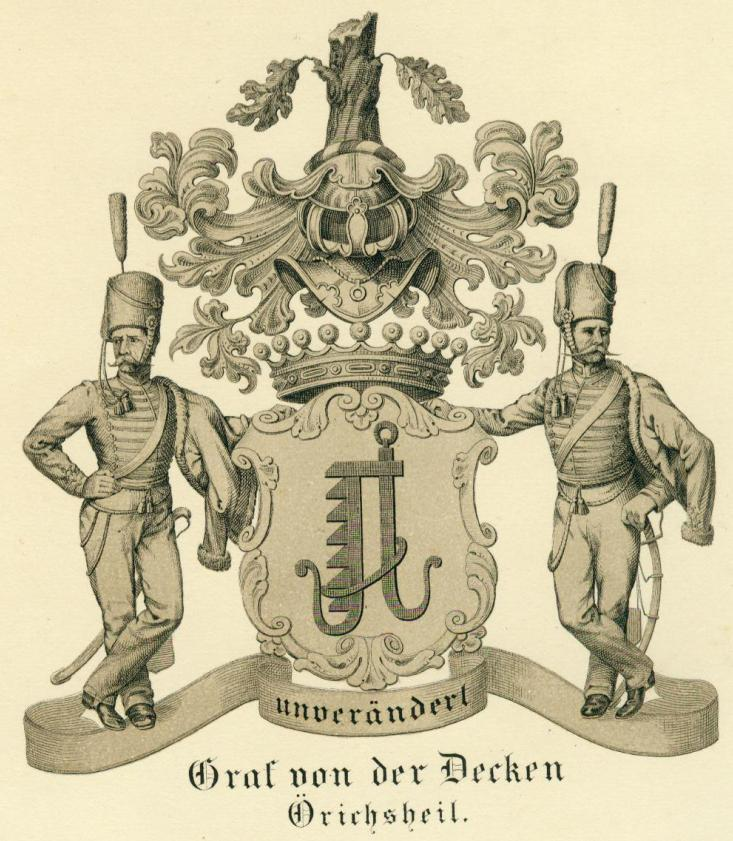
The General of the Cavalry Count Georg J.W.L. von der Decken chose as blazon holders two soldiers of the 1. Hussar-Regiment of the King's German Legion, a Regiment, in which he had distinguished himself so much. He was honored with the title Graf in 1835. He had no legitimate children, therefore the title did not continue after his death in 1859.

== Notable family members ==
- Auguste von der Decken (1827–1908), writer, pseudonym Auguste von der Elbe
- Claus von der Decken (died 1541) councillor and mayor of the town of Stade. He was a principal supporter of Bremen's Prince-Archbishop John III.
- Claus von der Decken (born 1742 in Ritterhausen near Balje, died 1826 in Hanover), Hanoverian minister.
- Count Johann Friedrich von der Decken (born 1769 in Langwedel, died 1840 in Ringelheim), Hanoverian Generalfeldzeugmeister.
- Karl Klaus von der Decken (born 1833 in Kotzen, died 1865 in Bardera in Somalia), Explorer in East Africa, especially at the Kilimanjaro and at the Jubba River.
- Count Georg von der Decken from Ringelheim (born 1836 in Brunswick, died 1898 in Ringelheim), Member of Reichstag of the Deutsch-Hannoversche Partei. Grandson of Johann Friedrich von der Decken.
- John Decker (born 1895 in Berlin, died 1947 in Los Angeles), was born with the name Leopold von der Decken or Leopold Avenarius. He was a painter, sculptor and caricaturist in London, New York City and Los Angeles. Grandson of Count Georg von der Decken.
- Kerstin von der Decken (born 1968), German politician (CDU)
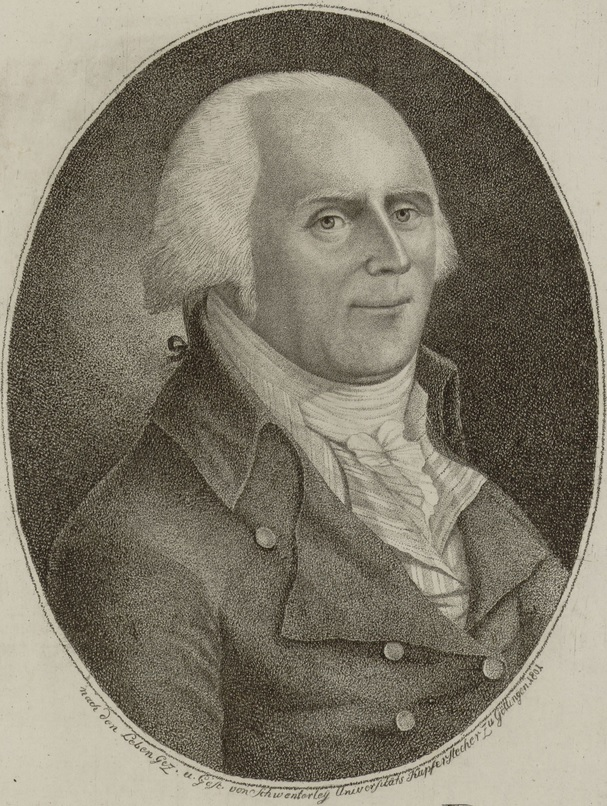
Claus von der Decken (1742–1826), Hanoverian state minister.

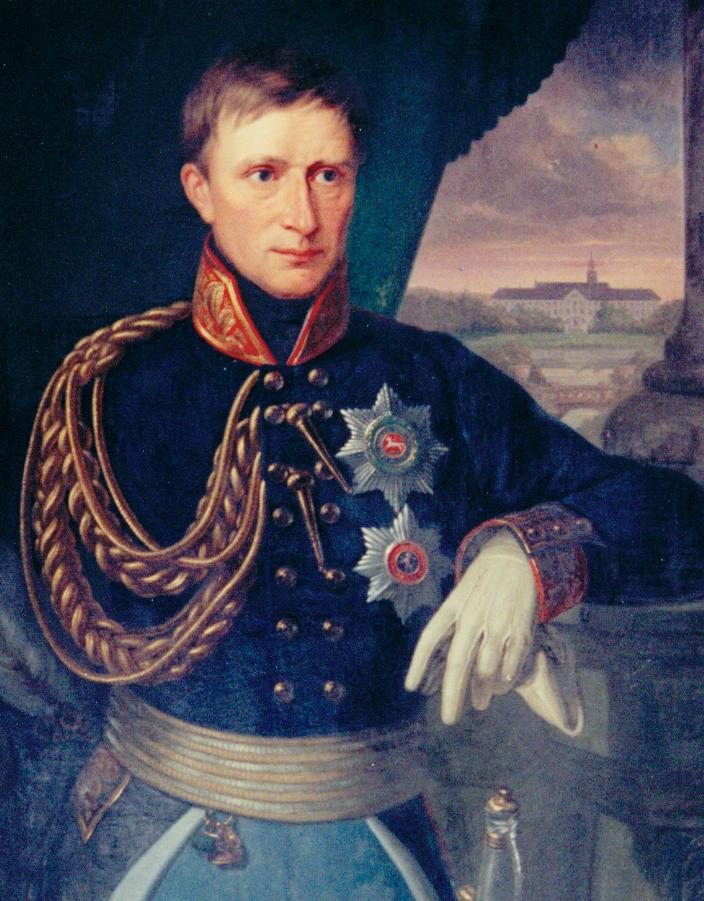
Johann Friedrich von der Decken (1769–1840), King's Hanoverian Generalfeldzeugmeister

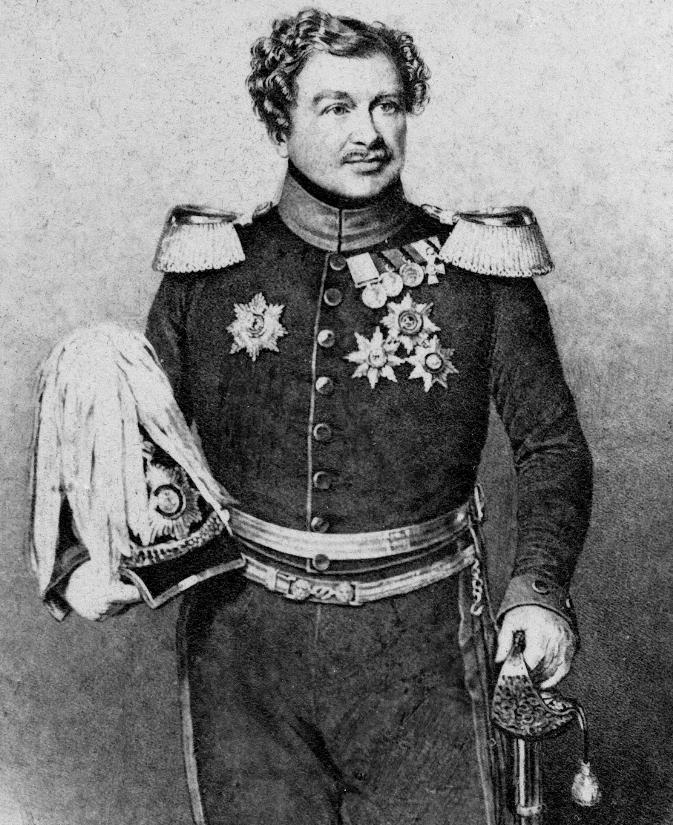
Count Georg J.W.L. von der Decken (1787–1859), King's Hanoverian General of the Cavalry (Germany).

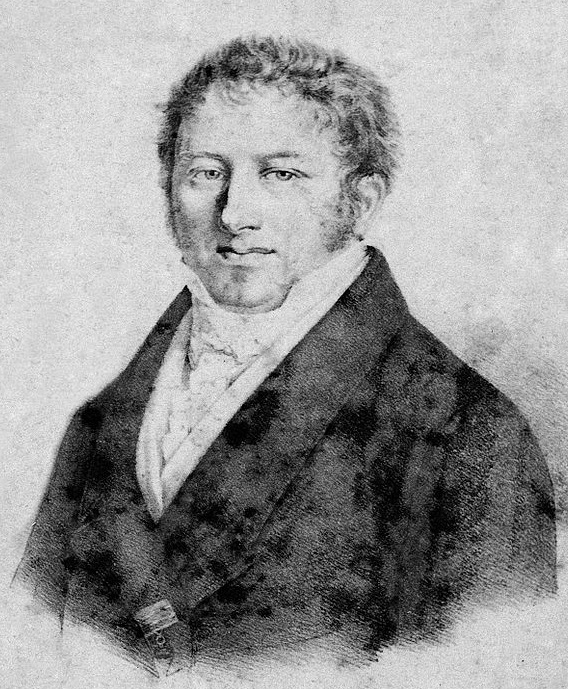
Claus von der Decken (1782–1839), Oberhauptmann of Harburg (lawyer)

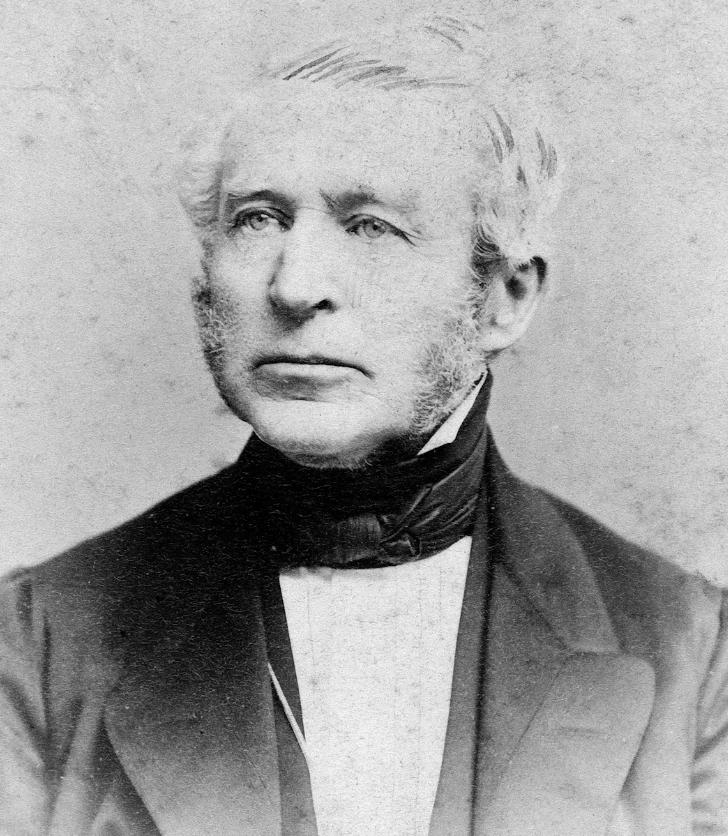
Friedrich von der Decken (1802–1881), King's Hanoverian state minister.

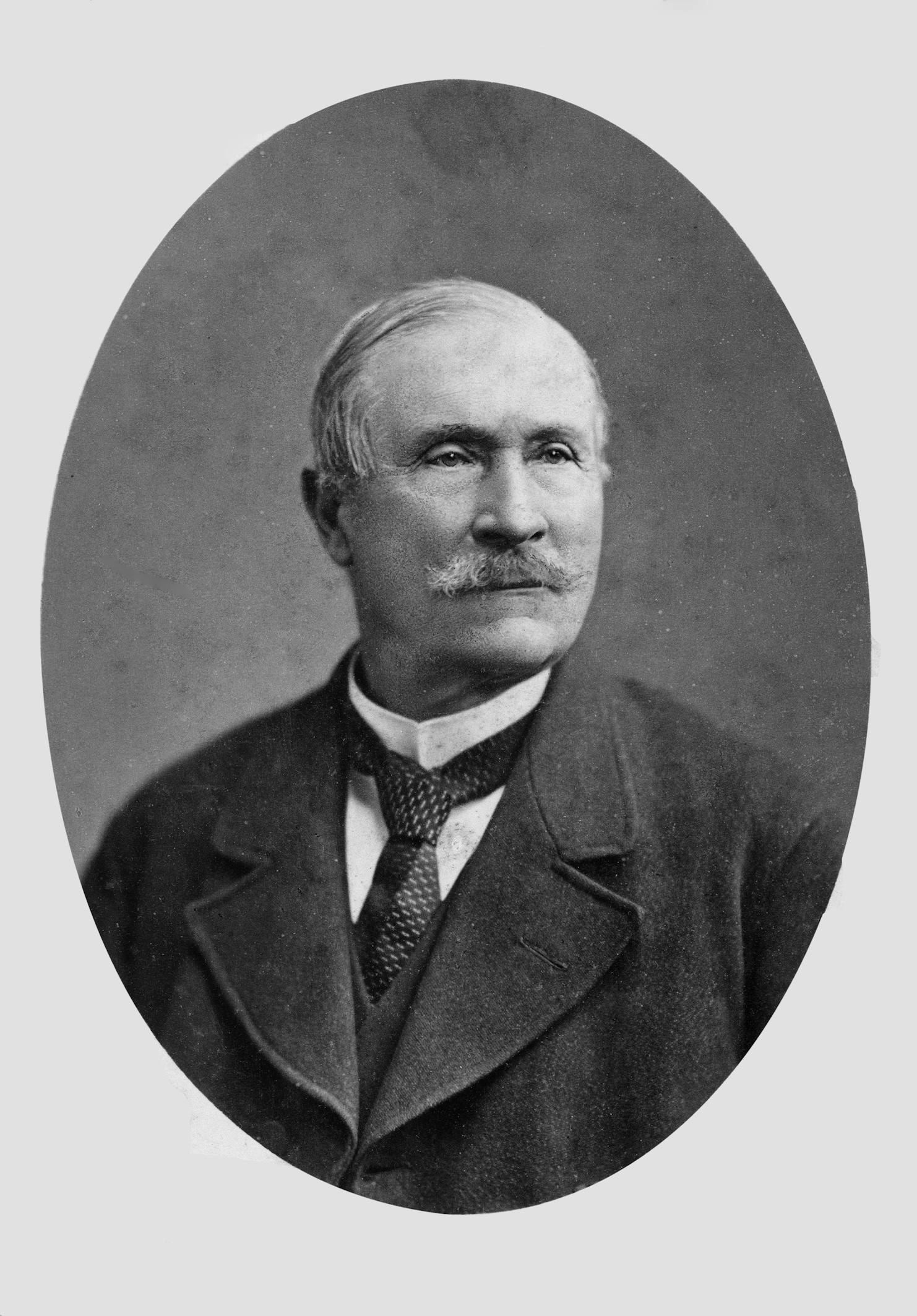
Count Adolphus von der Decken (1807–1886), Hanoverian diplomat.

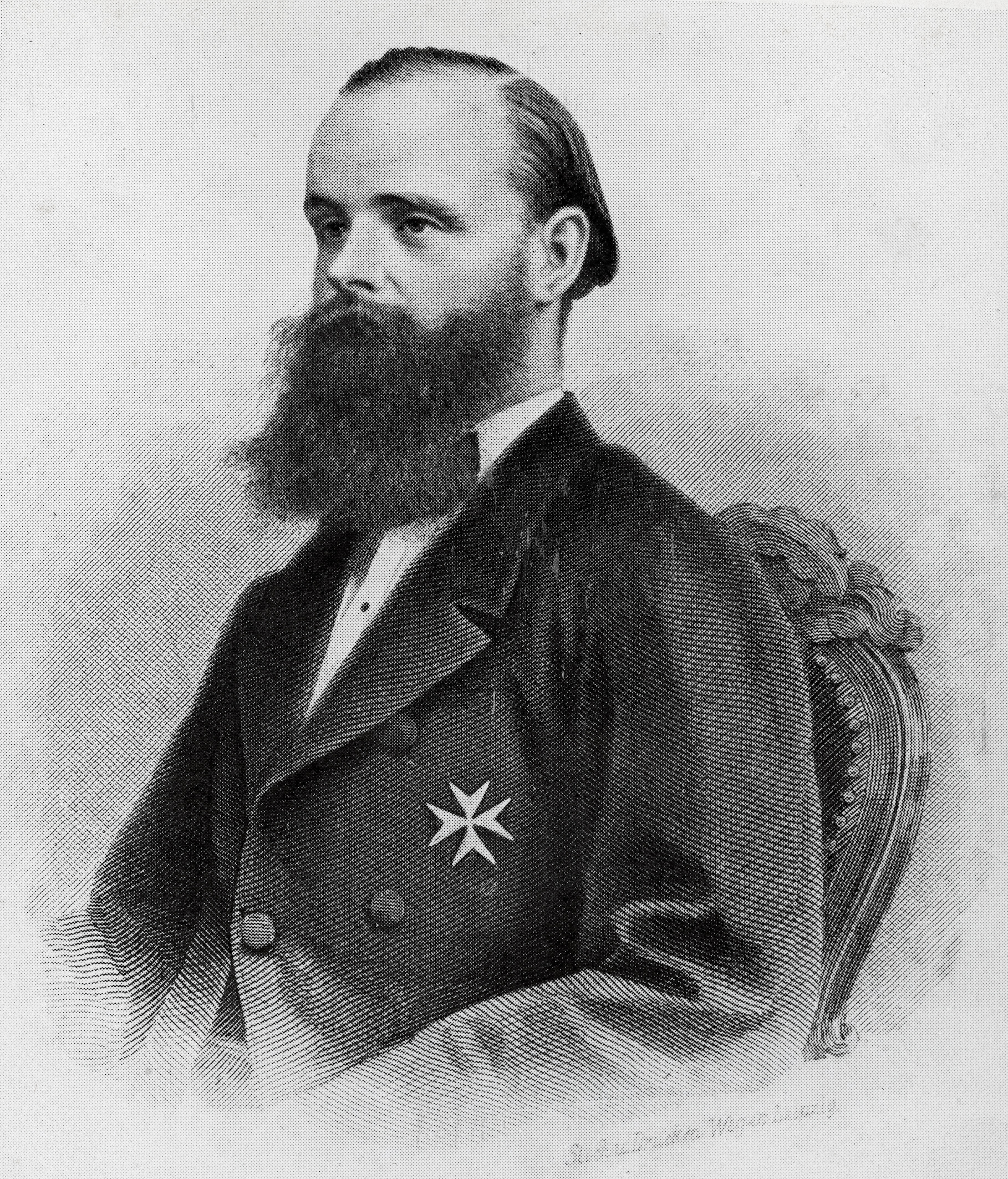
Karl Klaus von der Decken (1833–1865), Explorer of East Africa

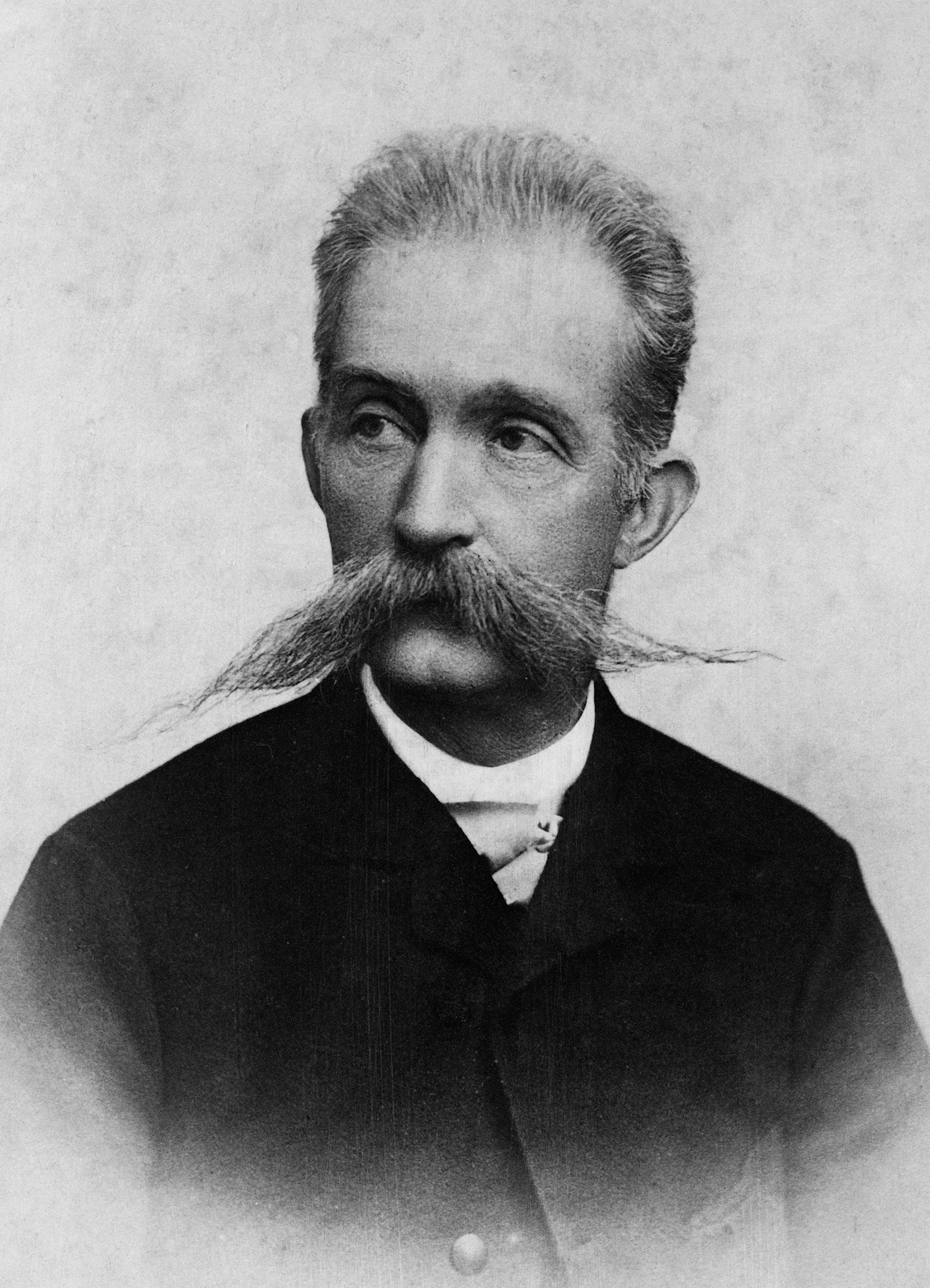
Count Georg von der Decken (1836–1898), Member of Reichstag.

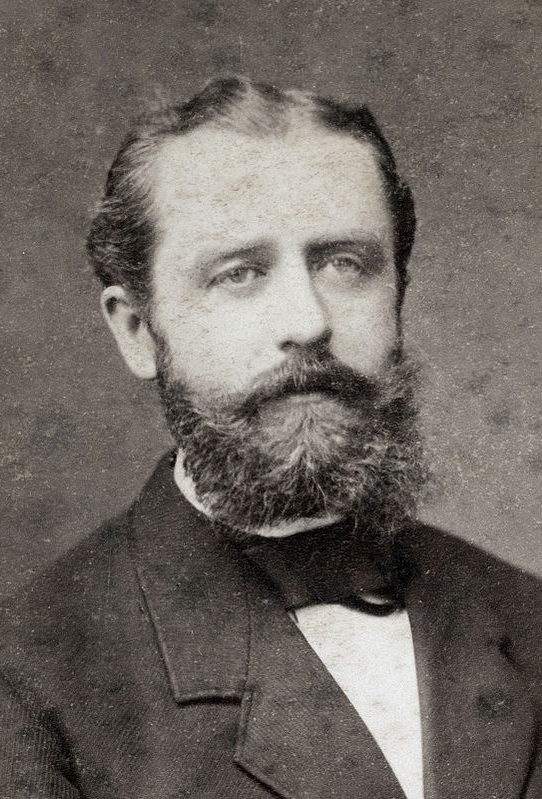
Otto von der Decken (1839–1916), Member of Reichstag.

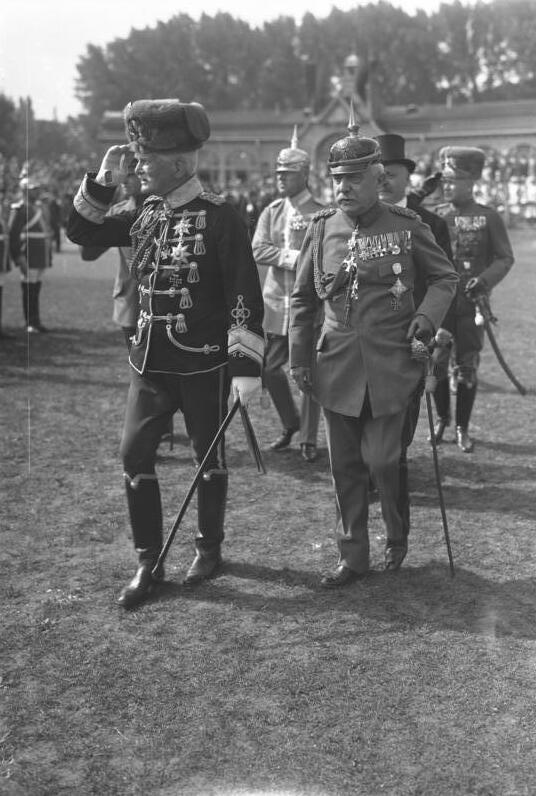
On the right-hand side lieutenant general Otto von der Decken (1858-1937) with field marshal August von Mackensen, (1849-1945) 1931 in Dresden at a military review of German cavalry

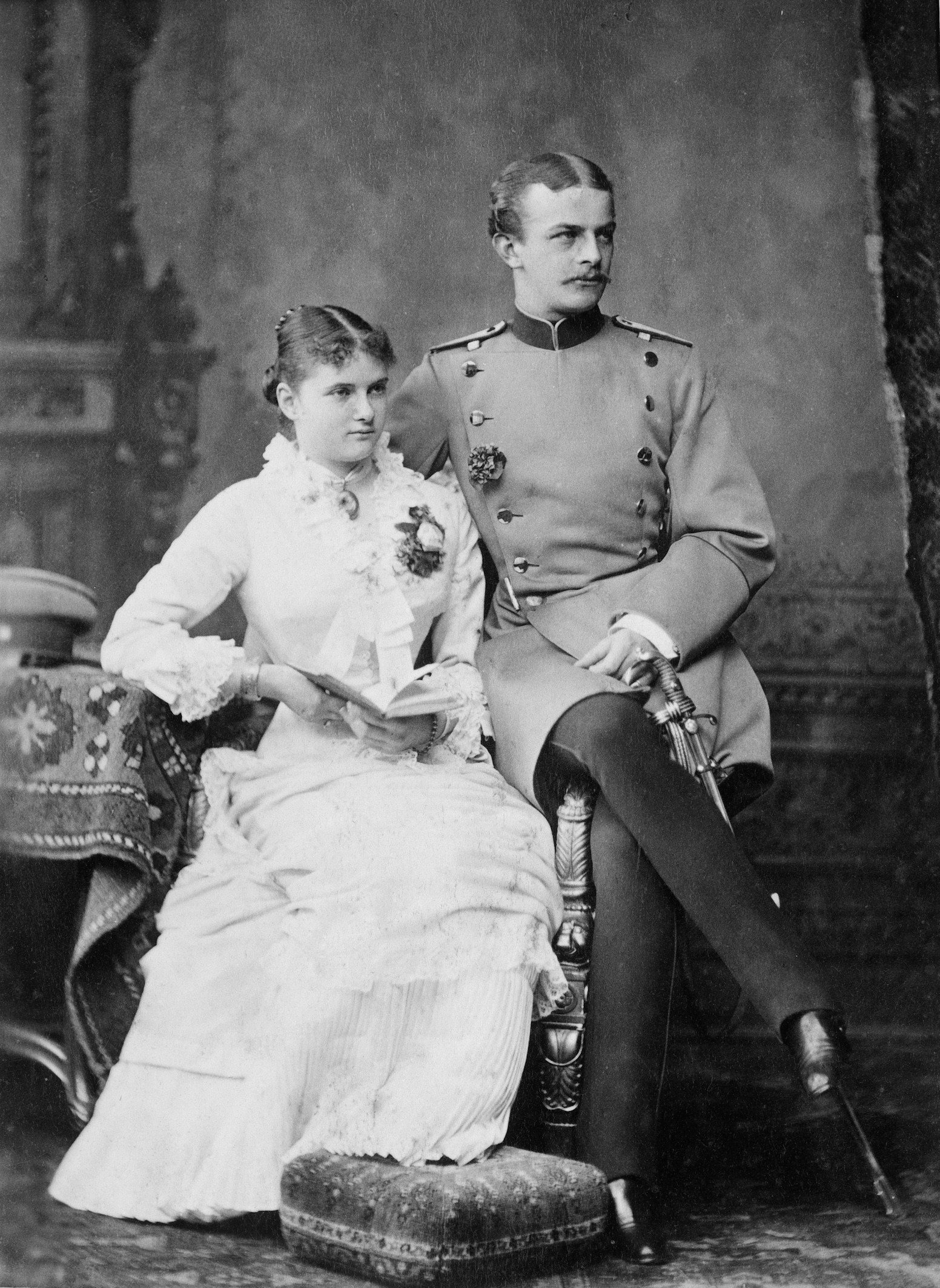
Charlotte von der Decken (1863–1933) and her husband Count Frederick of Hohenau, son of Prince Albert of Prussia

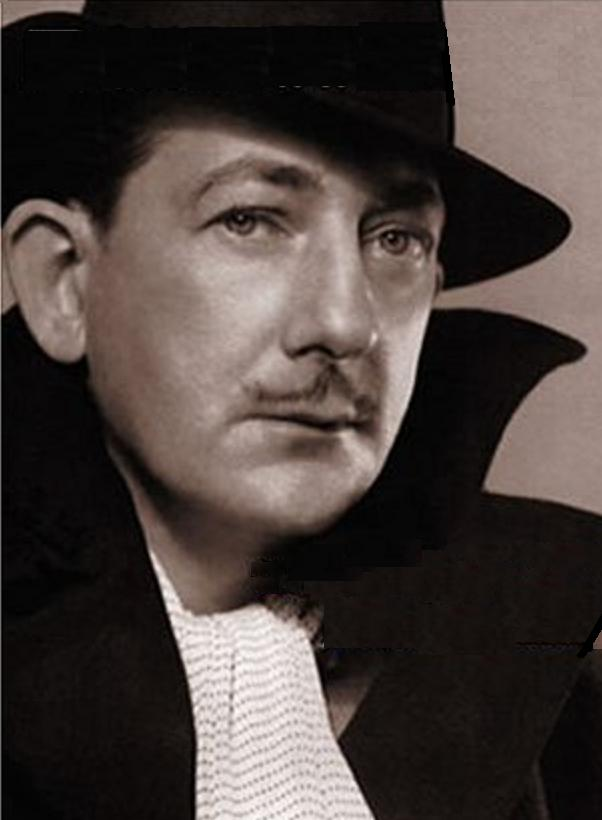
Leopold von der Decken (1895–1947) changed his name to John Decker when he left Europe in 1921. He was a notable painter, set designer, statuary and caricaturist in Hollywood

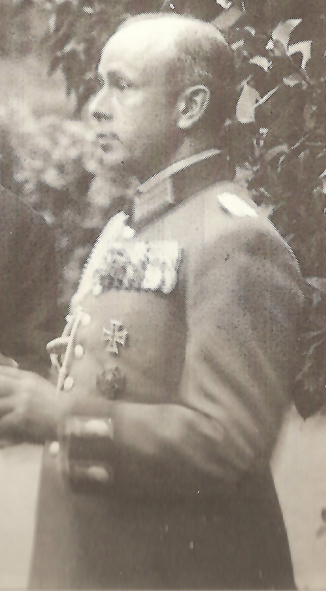
George von der Decken (1898–1945), German officer.

== Bibliography in German language ==
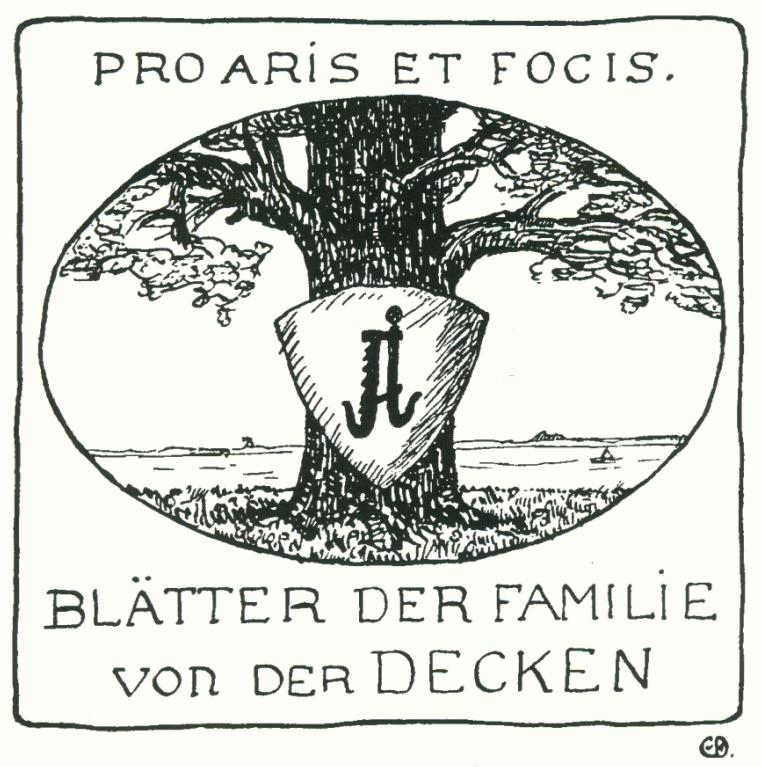
Oak tree with coat of arms on the title of the Yearly Family News. Pro Aris et Focis is the heraldic motto.

- Luneberg Mushard, Monumenta Nobilitatis Antiqvæ Familiarum Illustrium, Inprimis Ordinis Equestris in Ducatibus Bremensi & Verdensi, i. e. Denckmahl Der Uhralten/ berühmten Hochadelichen Geschlechter/ Insonderheit Der Hochlöblichen Ritterschafft Im Hertzogthum Bremen und Verden (Monuments of the ancient and famous noble families, especially of the Knighthood in the Duchy of Bremen-Verden), Bremen: Brauer, 1708, pp. 192–201.
- Elias Friedrich Schmersahl, „Nachricht von dem alten ritterbürtigen Geschlechte der Herren von der Decken im Lande Kehdingen“ (a report on the von der Decken family), in: Hamburgisches Magazin, vol. 9 (1752), pp. 619–629.
- Wilhelm von der Decken (1807–1866) Secretary of the Kingdom of Hanover, Die Familie von der Decken in ihren verschiedenen Verhältnissen dargestellt (history of the family von der Decken), Hanover: Klindworth's Hof-Druckerei, 1865.
- Blätter der Familie von der Decken (i.e. annual family news), 1919–....
- Richard Drögereit (1957). "Decken, v. der.". Neue Deutsche Biographie (in German). Vol. 3. Berlin: Duncker & Humblot. pp. 544–545.
- Genealogisches Handbuch des Adels, Adelslexikon volume 56, 1974 and endorsements in volume 144, 2008
- Ernst Heinrich Kneschke, Neues allgemeines deutsches Adels-Lexicon (encyclopedia on nobility), 1860, p. 433. Article on Decken and Decken-Offen
- Johann Siebmacher, Siebmachers Wappenbuch (Book on coat of arms in Germany, Austria and Switzerland), 1605 in WIKIMEDIA COMMONS: Ritterschaft und Adel in Brauschweig there on p. 181 "V. DER TECKE" is the misspelled writing of "V. DER DECKEN"
- Brümmel, v. Gruben, v. Marschalck: Die Güter der Ritterschaft im Herzogtum Bremen (estates in the Duchy of Bremen), Stade: Ritterschaft der Herzogtümer Bremen und Verden, 2001

== See also ==
- Genealogy of the von der Decken family
- List of German noble families starting with the letter D
