= Immedingians =

Saxon noble family

The Immedingians (German: Immedinger) were a noble family of medieval Saxony, descended from the Saxon leader Widukind. The most notable member was Saint Matilda (of Ringelheim; d. 968), queen consort of King Henry I of Germany.

== History ==
They were important benefactors of the church in tenth century Saxony with members including the Saint Emma of Lesum and her brother Bishop Meinwerk of Paderborn. Matilda's grandmother Matilda I was abbess at Herford Abbey. About 940 one Count Immad of the Immedinger dynasty established a convent of nuns at Ringelheim in Eastphalia. Queen Matilda herself upon the death of her husband in 936 donated Quedlinburg Abbey, where she is also buried.

According to the Res gestae saxonicae by the chronicler Widukind of Corvey, Matilda of Ringelheim's father, the Westphalian count Dietrich of Ringelheim, was a descendant of dux Widukind. A sister of Matilda's married Count Wichmann the Elder from the House of Billung. A genealogy has not yet been conclusively established.
