= Reinhild =

Reinhild may refer to:

- Reinhild, a saint of the 7th century
- Reinhild, a woman of the Middle Ages
- Reinhild Möller, paraolympic Skier
