= John Decker (artist) =

American cartoonist

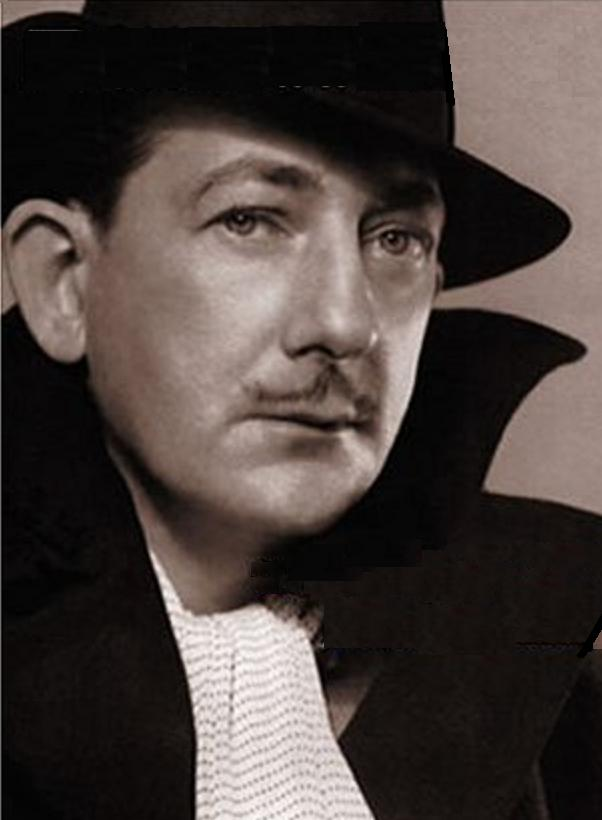
Artist and designer Leopold von der Decken changed his name to John Decker when he left Europe in 1921

John Decker (born Leopold von der Decken; November 8, 1895 – June 8, 1947) was a painter, set designer and caricaturist in Hollywood during the 1930s and 1940s.

== Life and work ==
Leopold von der Decken was born in Berlin, Germany. As a teenager, he lived in London, painting scenery in theatres; this was interrupted by the advent of the First World War, when he was arrested as an enemy alien and interned on the Isle of Man. In 1921, he changed his name to John Decker and emigrated to America, where he worked as a cartoonist for the New York Evening World until 1928, when he moved to Hollywood and took up fine art.

Many film stars, including Anthony Quinn, Errol Flynn, Charlie Chaplin, Greta Garbo, and the Marx Brothers, commissioned Decker to paint their portraits, and many of his works were used in films: the paintings of the frustrated artist protagonist in Fritz Lang's 1945 film Scarlet Street were actually by Decker. One of his most famous portraits, depicting his friend and drinking companion W.C. Fields as Queen Victoria, hung for many years at Chasen's Restaurant in West Hollywood, California. An oil painting of John Wayne, which Wayne commissioned Decker to paint in 1945, sold for $71,700 at a John Wayne estate auction conducted by Heritage Auctions on October 6, 2011. Like his friends Fields and John Barrymore, the years of seemingly endless drinking sprees wreaked massive damage on his body, resulting in a premature death. Decker died in Hollywood on June 8, 1947, at age 51.

=== Family background ===
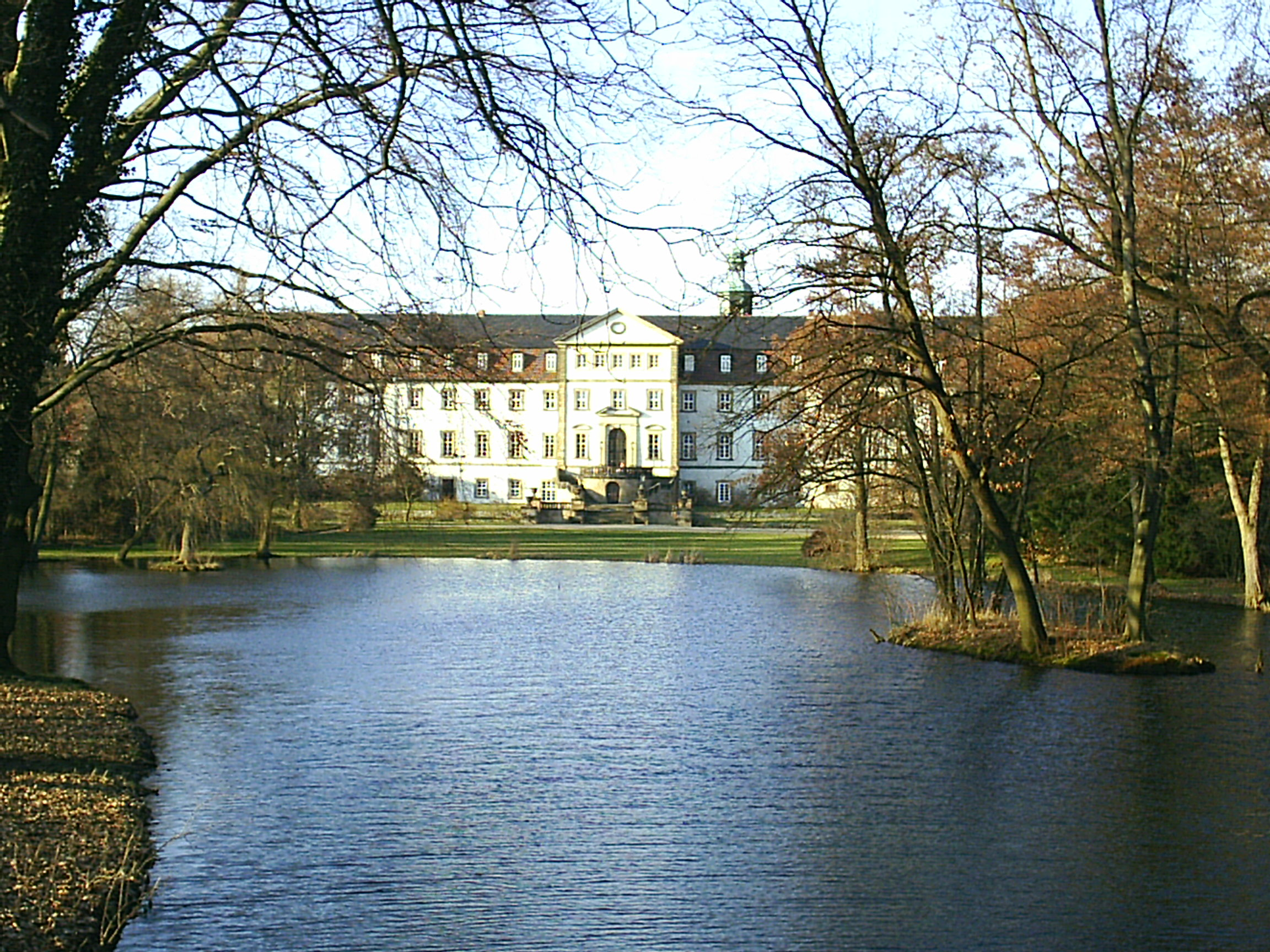
Castle Ringelheim in Salzgitter, Germany, where Decker's father grew up

Decker's mother, Maria Anna Avenarius (1865–1918), was an opera singer, who performed Wagnerian operas in Berlin and Bayreuth. Her father, Ferdinand Avenarius, was an actor. Decker's father, Graf Ernst August von der Decken (1867–1934), grew up in the castle Ringelheim in Salzgitter, Germany, and became a reporter for British and German newspapers. His parents met in the operas of Berlin and Bayreuth. In 1897, two years after their son's birth, they moved to London and married in April 1898 in Greenwich.

Decker's grandfather Graf Georg von der Decken was a member of the German Reichstag. Like his grandson, George was an artist and created huge oil paintings of his castle, paintings for the neighbouring church, and carved wooden sculptures.

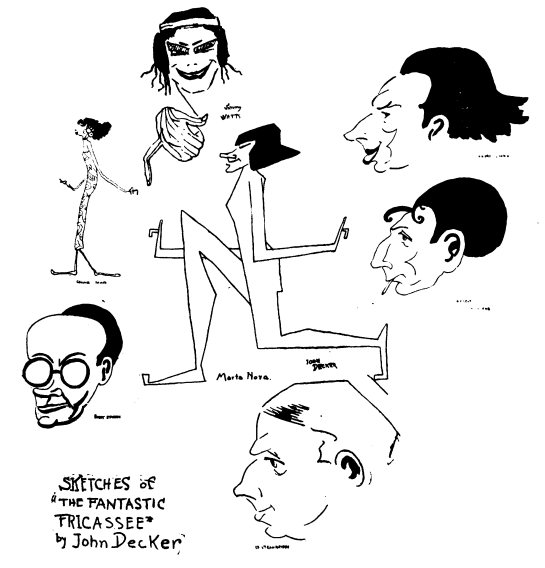
Karikaturen in Greenwich Village Quill (1922)

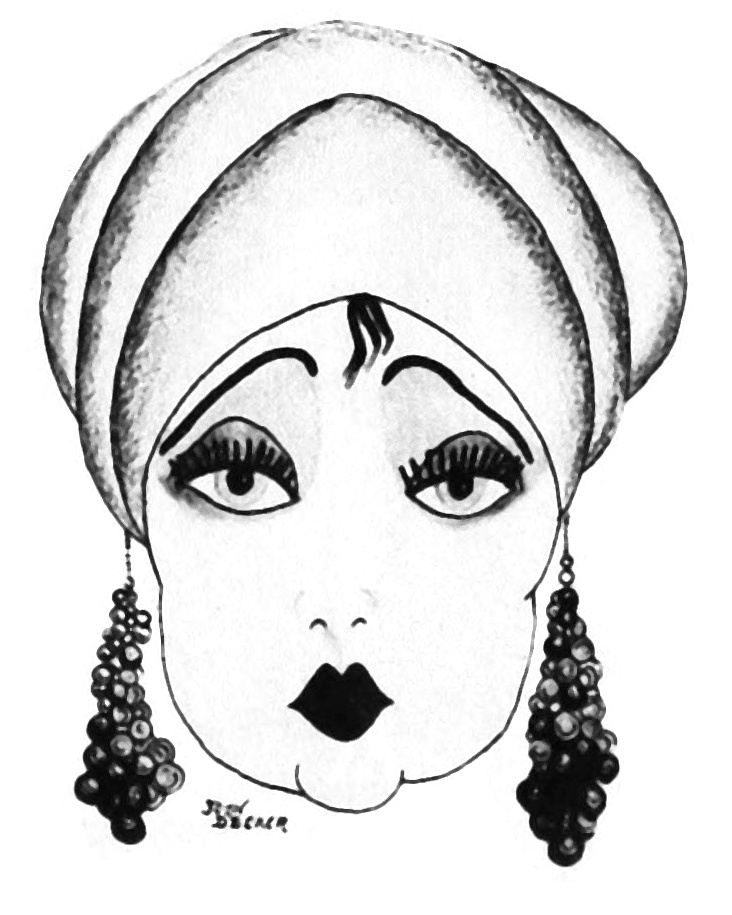
Caricature of Betty Blythe by John Decker

== Gallery ==
The Silver Screen, caricature studies of Hollywood actors and actresses of the 1920s and 1930s to a mural decoration 1941:

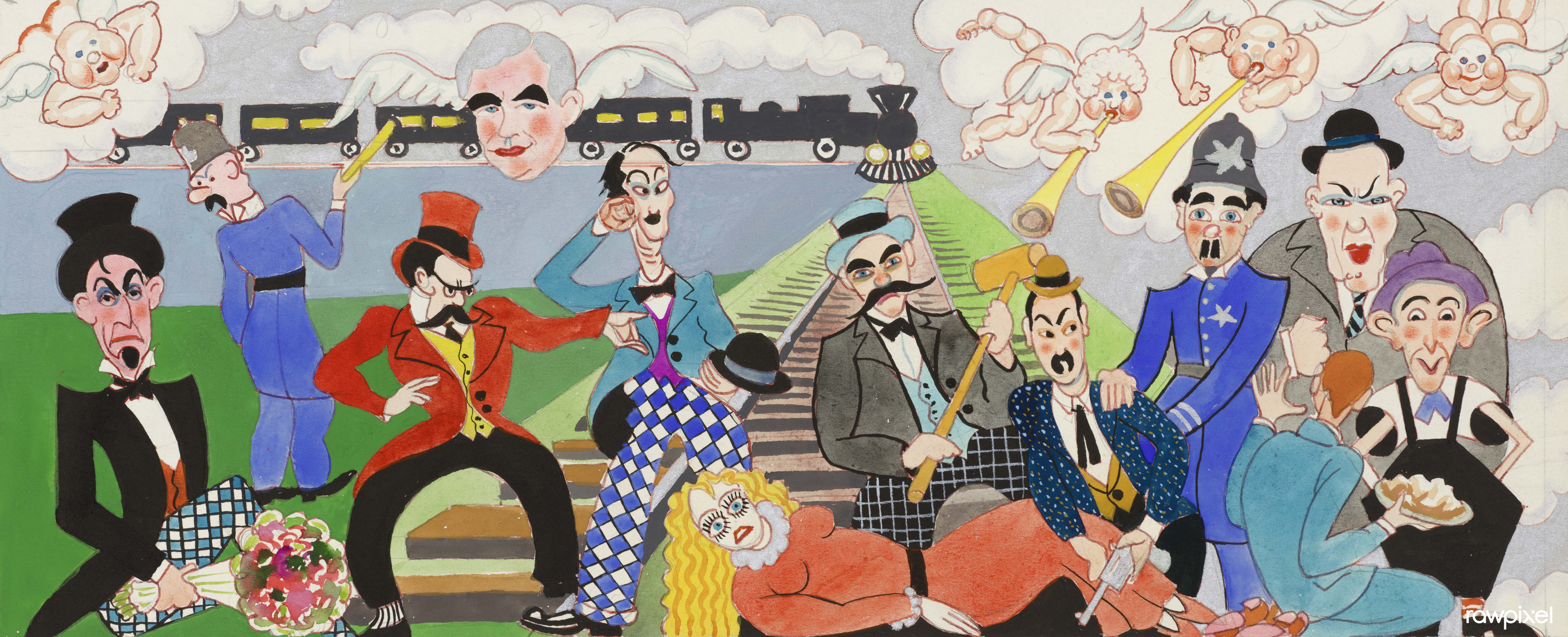
Ford Sterling, Ben Turpin, Mack Sennett, Pearl White, Chester Conklin, Paul Panzer, and more

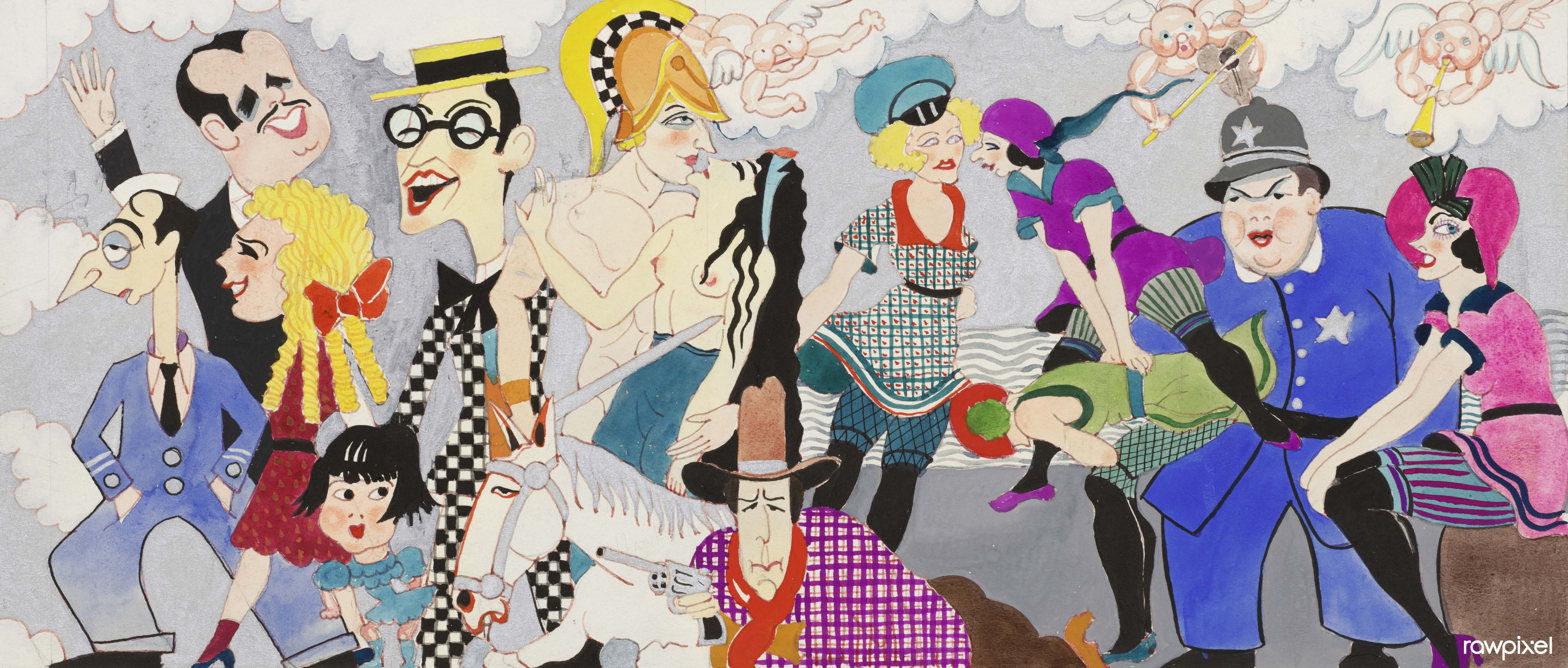
Buster Keaton, Douglas Fairbanks, Mary Pickford, Harold Clayton Lloyd, Francis X. Bushman, Carmel Myers, William Surrey Hart, Gloria Swanson, Roscoe Arbuckle, and Peggy Montgomery

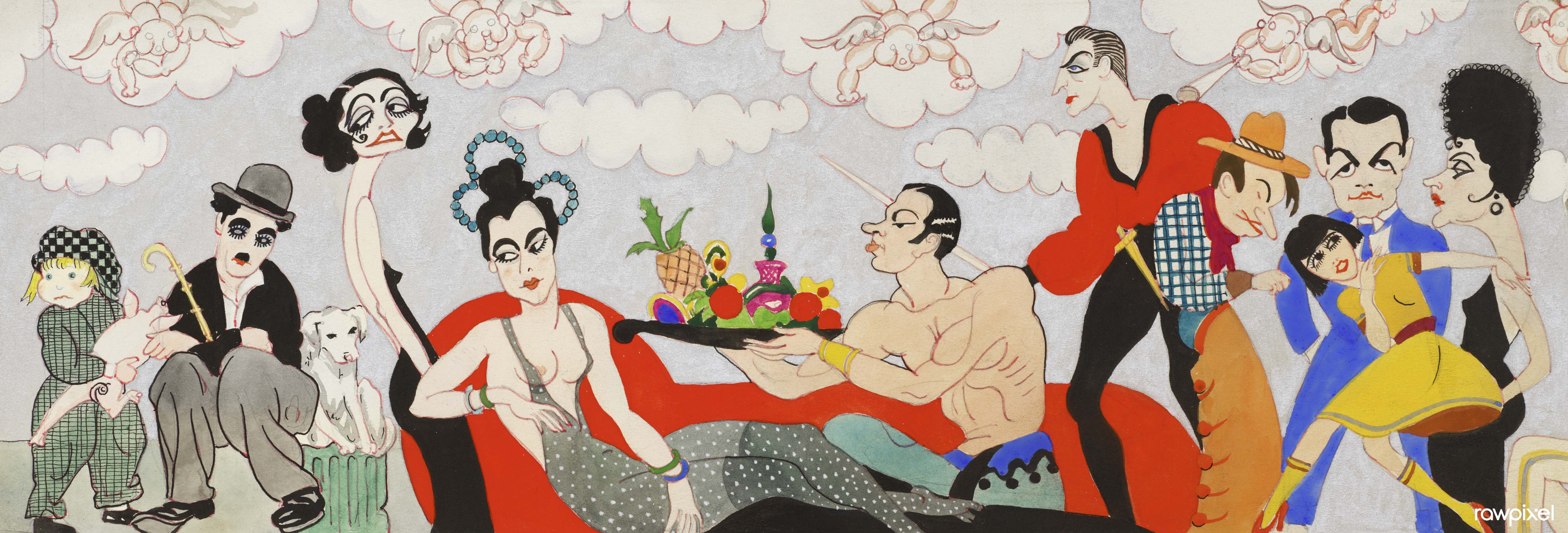
Charles Chaplin, Jackie Coogan, John Barrymore, Will Rogers, Colleen Moore, Chester Morris, Rod La Rocque, and Nita Naldi

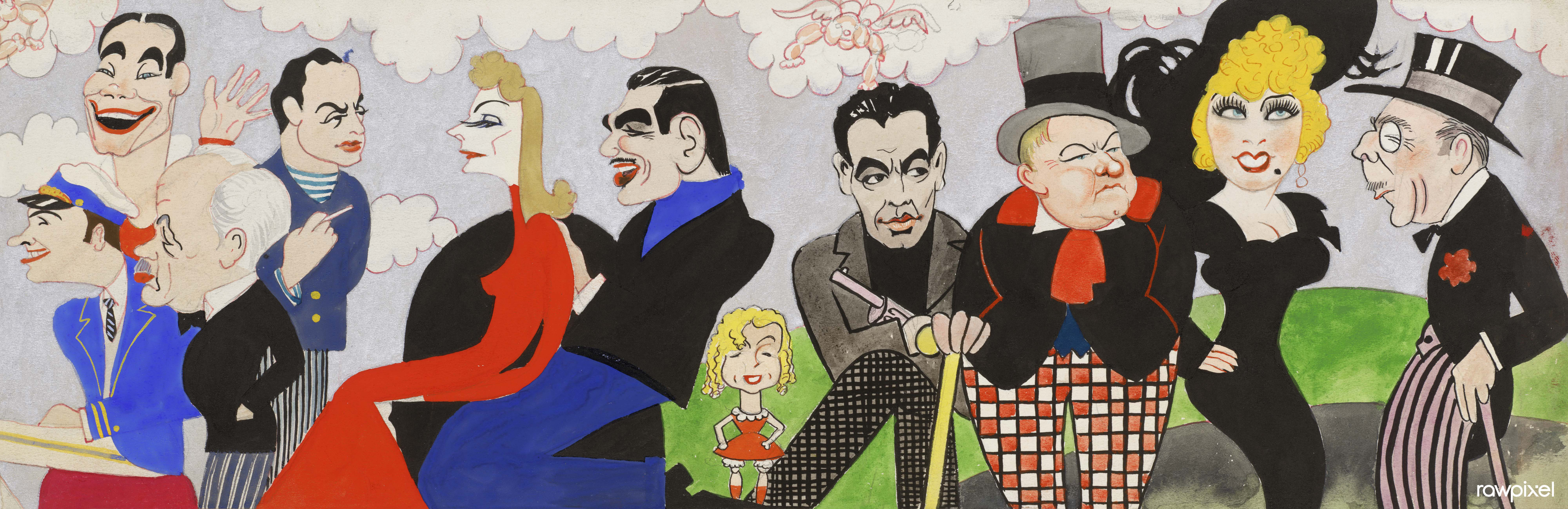
Bob Hope, Joe E. Brown, Charles Winninger, Charles Boyer, Greta Garbo, Clark Gable, Shirley Temple, Humphrey Bogart, William Claude Fields, Mae West, and Roland Young
