= Dietrich of Ringelheim =

Saxon count of the Middle Ages

Count of Ringelheim Dietrich of Ringelheim
- Pronunciation: German: [ˈdiːtʁɪç]
- Born: 858 to 867
- Died: 916 to 920

Dietrich of Ringelheim, also known as Theodoric, was a Saxon count of the Middle Ages.

== Biography ==
Dietrich was a medieval Saxon count in the German region of Westphalia. According to contemporary chronicles, his Immedinger family stemmed from the house of the Saxon duke Widukind. Dietrich was probably born in the second half of the 9th century, a few decades after the Saxons were brought under the control of Charlemagne's Frankish empire.

Dietrich apparently married twice, first to Gisela of Lotharingia with whom he had three daughters: Amalrada, Bia, and Frederuna. Secondly he married Reinhild, who was of "royal Danish and Frisian blood". With her he had Matilda, who married Henry the Fowler, King of East Francia.

His date of death remains uncertain, but might have been after the 910s according to the Memoirs of the Royal Academy of Sciences and Letters. According to genealogieonline, Dietrich died between 916 and 920. He became distinguished as Dietrich of Ringelheim in later literature.
