= Kotzen =

- Municipality
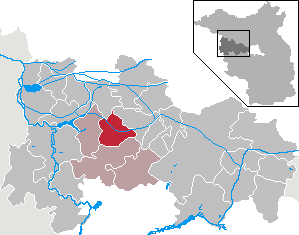
- Location of Kotzen within Havelland district
- Interactive map of Kotzen
- Location within Germany Location within Brandenburg
- Coordinates: 52°37′59″N 12°31′00″E
- Country: Germany
- State: Brandenburg
- District: Havelland
- Municipal assoc.: Nennhausen
- Subdivisions: 4 Ortsteile

Government
  - Mayor (2024–29): Jan-Peer Michalek

Area
  - Total: 42.87 km^{2} (16.55 sq mi)
- Elevation: 27 m (89 ft)

Population (2025-12-31)
  - Total: 649
  - Density: 15.1/km^{2} (39.2/sq mi)
- Time zone: UTC+01:00 (CET)
  - Summer (DST): UTC+02:00 (CEST)
- Postal codes: 14715
- Dialling codes: 033874
- Vehicle registration: HVL
- Website: www.amt-nennhausen.de

Kotzen (German pronunciation: [ˈkɔtsn̩]) is a municipality in the Havelland district, in Brandenburg, Germany.

== Demography ==
Development of population since 1875 within the current boundaries (Blue line: Population; Dotted line: Comparison to population development of Brandenburg state; Grey background: Time of Nazi rule; Red background: Time of communist rule)

Kotzen: Population development
within the current boundaries (2013)

Year	Pop.	±% p.a.
1875	965	—
1890	951	−0.10%
1910	924	−0.14%
1925	1,002	+0.54%
1933	878	−1.64%
1939	814	−1.25%
1946	1,352	+7.52%
1950	1,368	+0.29%
1964	953	−2.55%
1971	950	−0.05%
1981	763	−2.17%
1985	798	+1.13%
1989	733	−2.10%
1990	724	−1.23%
1991	697	−3.73%
1992	702	+0.72%
1993	667	−4.99%
1994	659	−1.20%
1995	650	−1.37%
1996	653	+0.46%

Year	Pop.	±% p.a.
1997	653	+0.00%
1998	659	+0.92%
1999	664	+0.76%
2000	640	−3.61%
2001	642	+0.31%
2002	659	+2.65%
2003	650	−1.37%
2004	644	−0.92%
2005	651	+1.09%
2006	643	−1.23%
2007	629	−2.18%
2008	614	−2.38%
2009	631	+2.77%
2010	590	−6.50%
2011	588	−0.34%
2012	582	−1.02%
2013	577	−0.86%
2014	571	−1.04%
2015	585	+2.45%
2016	600	+2.56%

== Personalities ==
Explorer Karl Klaus von der Decken was born in Kotzen in 1833.
