= Georg von der Decken =

German diplomat and artist (1836–1898)

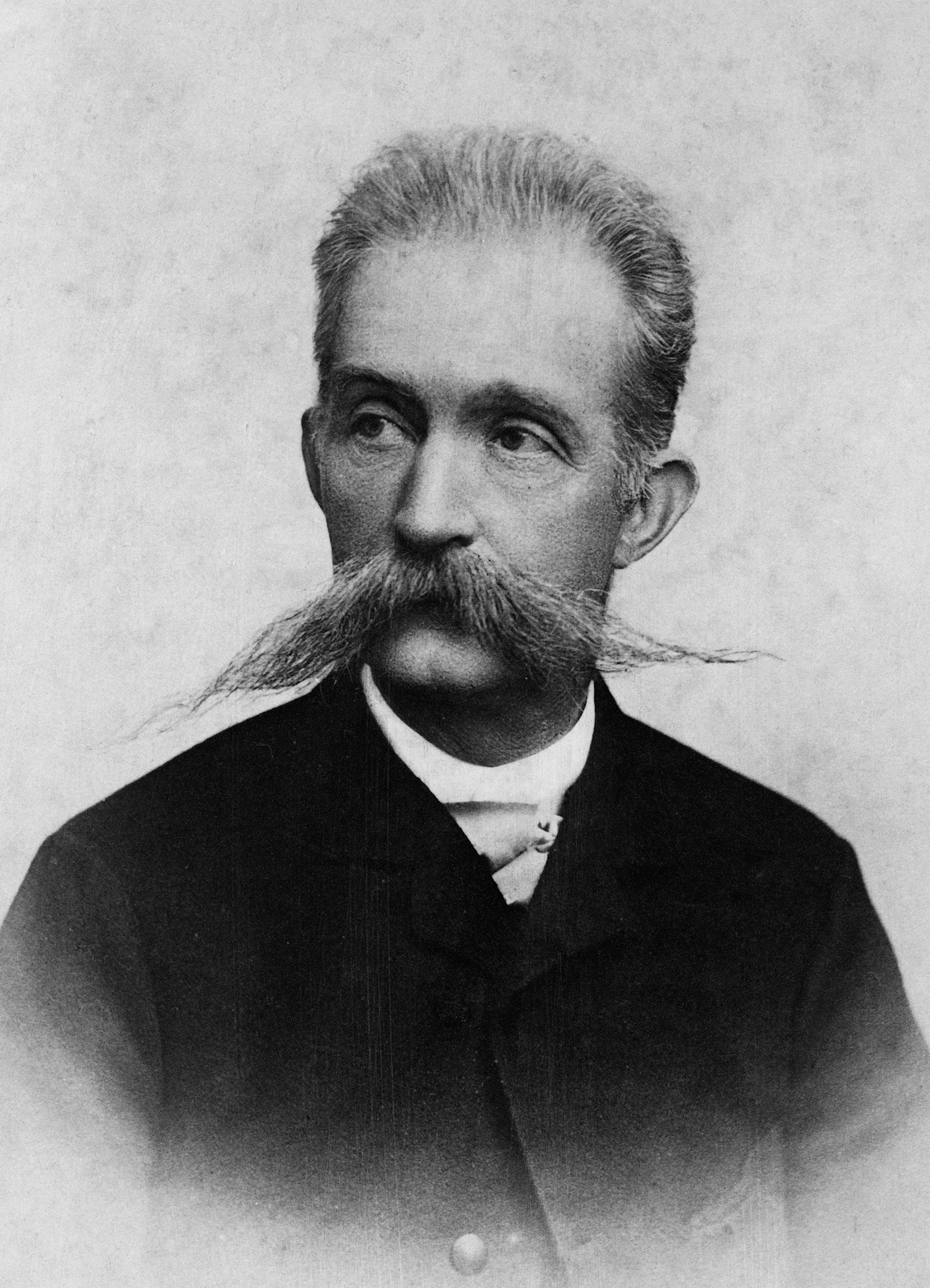
George von der Decken

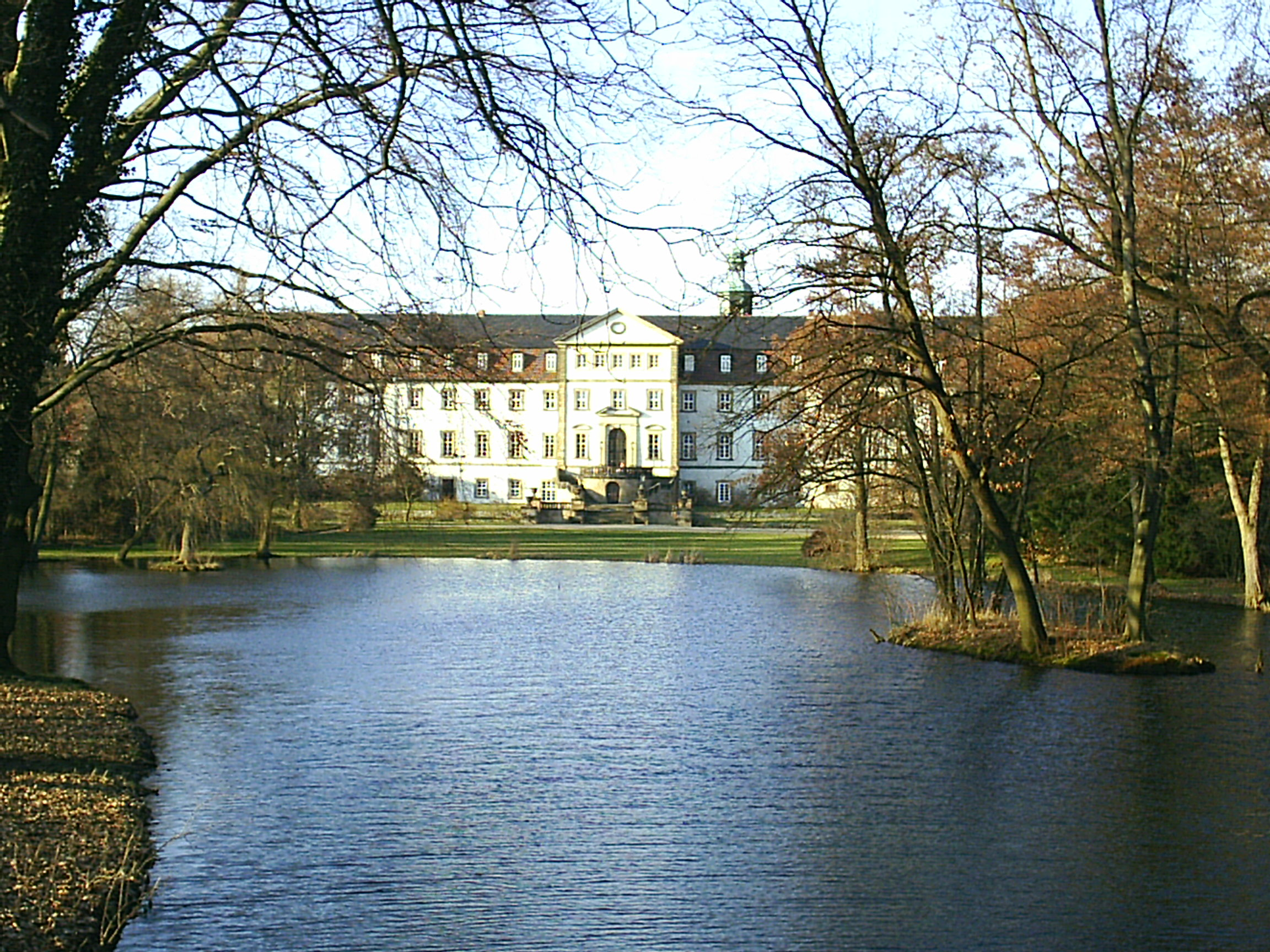
Castle Ringelheim

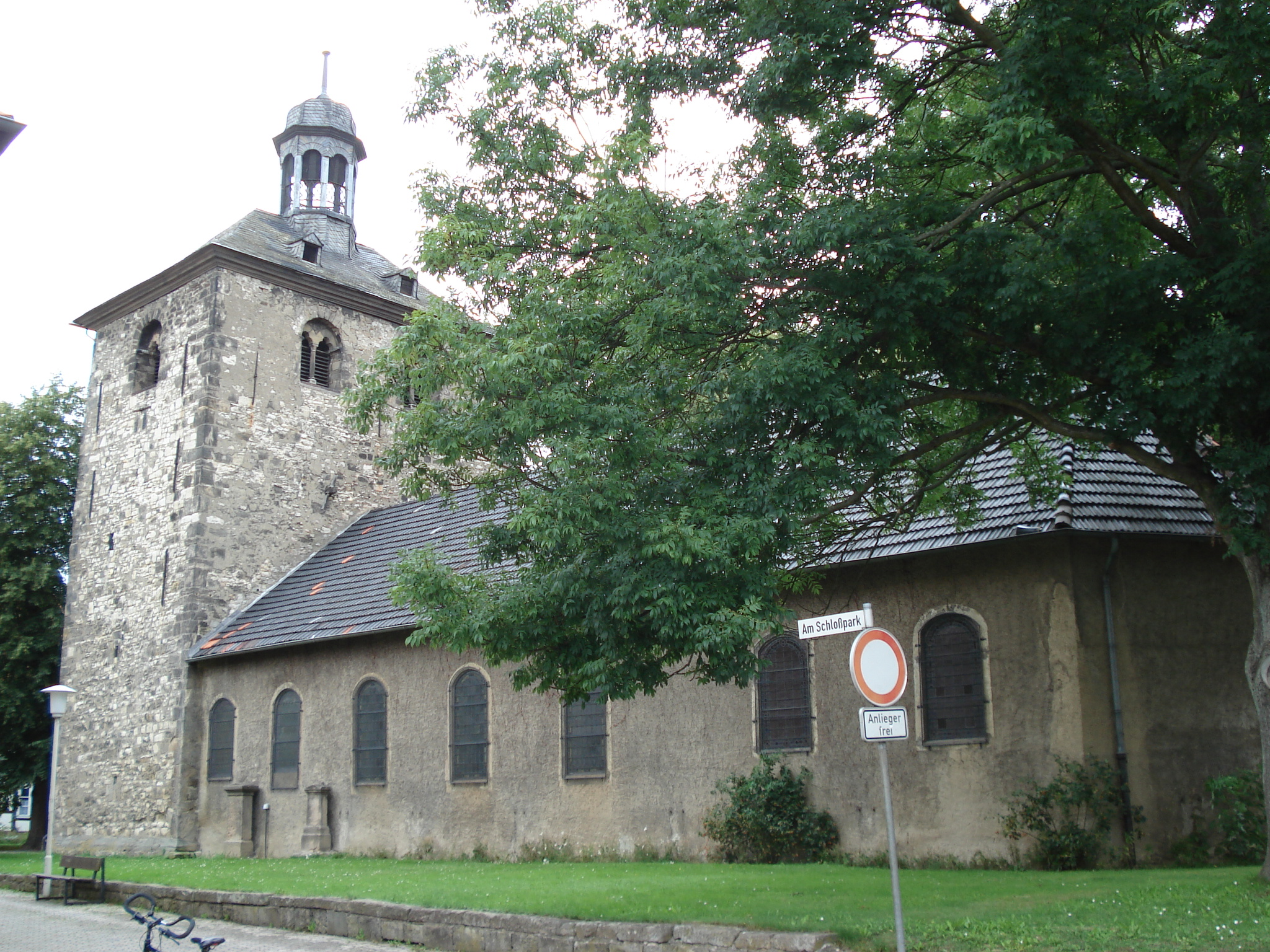
Church St. Johannes Baptista in Ringelheim. In this church there are many oil paintings and the painting of the ceiling made by Graf Georg.

Count Georg Friedrich Armand von der Decken (5 October 1836 in Braunschweig – 19 August 1898 in Salzgitter-Ringelheim) was owner of Castle Ringelheim and a member of the German Reichstag.

== Life ==
Decken was the son of Count Adolphus von der Decken and Louise von Wallmoden. He married in 1866 in Schlobitten Marie zu Dohna-Schlodien. She grew up in Mallmitz in Silesia. The couple had five children.

Before 1890, Decken was attaché at the Hanoverian Embassy in Paris. Here he had the opportunity to deepen his technic in painting. He was party leader of the German-Hanoverian Party since 1890 and distinguished as a political opponent of Otto von Bismarck and the Prussian supremacy in the German Reich. From 1890 until his death he was a member of the German Parliament for the Province of Hanover.

He was highly musical, painted large-scale oil paintings and created wooden sculptures. His motives were in accordance with the prevailing taste, romantic landscapes and figures from Greek heroic legend. In the church of Ringelheim there are still his oil paintings: the altar piece and the twelve disciples of Christ in life-size.
