= Friedrich von der Decken =

German diplomat (1769–1840)

Graf Friedrich von der Decken
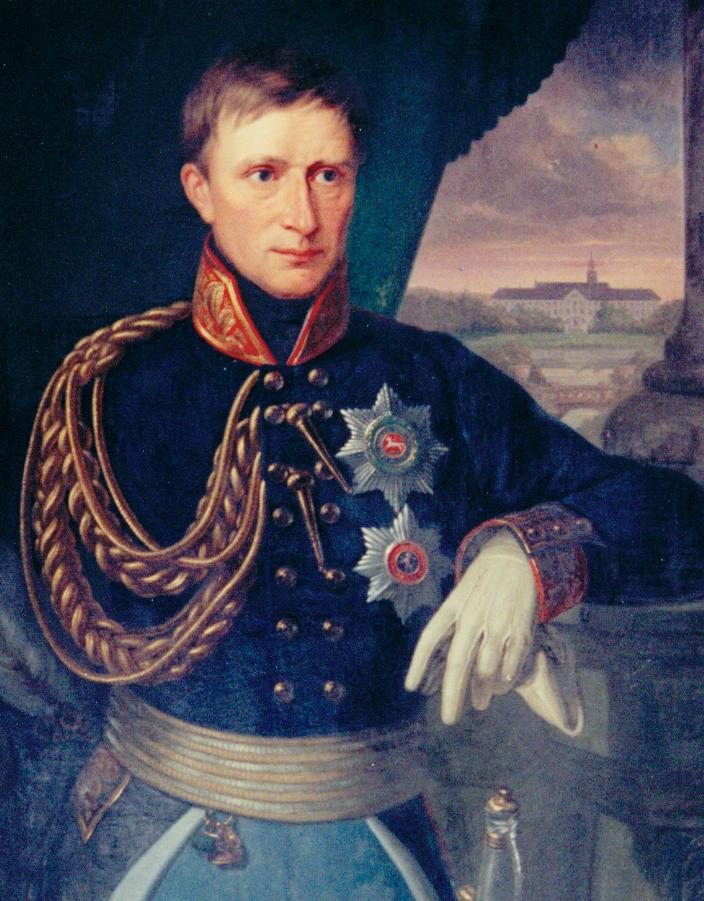
- 19th century portrait of von der Decken
- Born: 25 May 1769
- Died: 22 May 1840 (aged 70)
- Military career
- Allegiance: Electorate of Hanover; United Kingdom
- Branch: Hanoverian Army
- Service years: 1784–1816
- Rank: Colonel (Hanover)
- Unit: King’s German Legion
- Commands: King’s German Artillery
- Conflicts: French Revolutionary Wars; Napoleonic Wars; Peninsular War; Hundred Days
- Other work: President of the Lower Saxony Historical Society

Johann Friedrich von der Decken (25 May 1769 – 22 May 1840) was a Hanoverian army officer and diplomat who served in the Hanoverian and British armies and fought in the French Revolutionary and Napoleonic Wars.

== Life ==
The von der Deckens are an old noble family in Lower Saxony which produced several officers for the forces of the Electorate of Hanover. In 1784 Johann Friedrich joined the Hanoverian Army, fighting in the French Revolutionary Wars from 1793 to 1795. He headed a military journal with his friend Gerhard von Scharnhorst, the Prussian military reformer for many years. In 1803 he joined the diplomatic service on Napoleon's occupation of Hanover and left for the United Kingdom. On 28 July 1803 he began together with Sir Colin Halkett recruiting expatriate Hanoverian soldiers to fight for the United Kingdom in the War of the Third Coalition and subsequent Napoleonic conflicts, with his recruits forming the King's German Legion, with which he fought from 1805 to 1807.

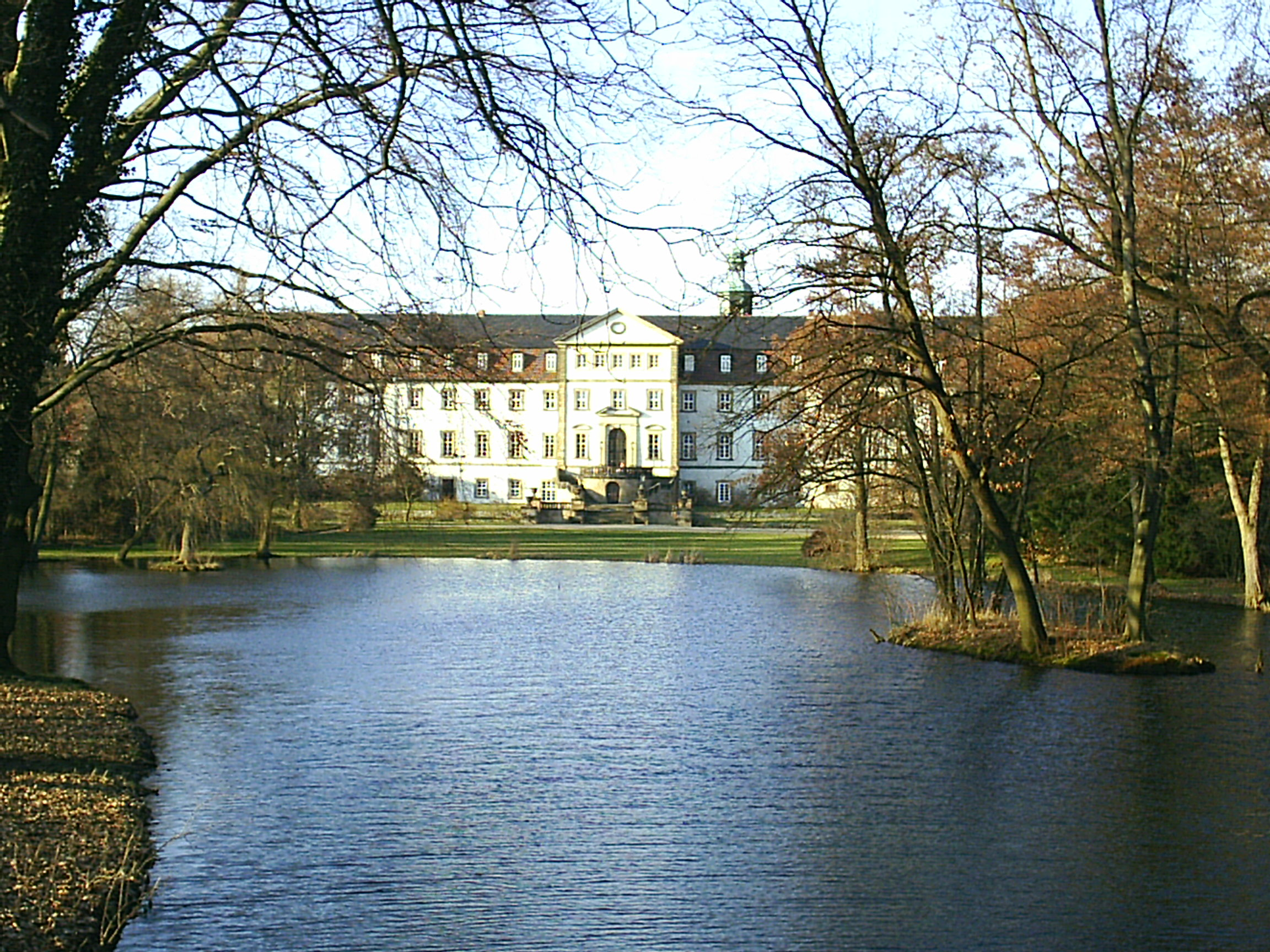
Castle Ringelheim in Salzgitter Germany

In 1808 he was sent to Spain and Portugal during the Peninsular War as a diplomat and military advisor and to recruit troops to fight against France, before returning to England, where in 1815 he organised another Hanoverian regiment to fight against the French during the Hundred Days. After the war he refused military decorations from the Netherlands and Prussia. In 1817 he bought the former Benedictine monastery in Ringelheim and rebuilt it as his country house, the Schloss und Park Ringelheim, spending his retirement there from 1833, the year in which he was made a count (Graf). It is a primogeniture title and it was given by William IV as king of the restored kingdom of Hanover. In 1835 he also became president of the Historical Society for Lower Saxony.

== General references ==
- Richard W Fox: Conservative accommodation to revolution : Friedrich von der Decken and the Hanoverian military reform, 1789-1820 : an inquiry into the role of the military in state and society – Thesis (PhD) – Yale University, 1972
- (in German) Karl Ernst Hermann Krause: Decken, Johann Friedrich, Graf in the Allgemeine Deutsche Biographie (ADB). Vol 5, Duncker & Humblot, Leipzig 1877, p. 2.

== Sources ==
- Beamish, North Ludlow (1834–1837). History of the King's German Legion. London: Thomas and William Boone. OCLC 24612003.
