= Westphalian =

Westphalian may refer to:

- The culture or people of the Westphalia region of Germany
- Westphalian language, one of the major dialect groups of West Low German
- Westphalian sovereignty, a concept in international relations
- Westphalian (stage), in geology
- Westphalian ham (Westfälischer Schinken) produced from acorn-fed pigs raised in Westphalia. The resulting meat is dry cured and then smoked over a mixture of beechwood and juniper branches.

== Animals ==
- Westphalian horse, a warmblood horse bred in the Westphalia region of western Germany
- Westphalian chicken, old hardy landrace of chicken
- Westphalian Dachsbracke, a small, short legged scenthound
