= Karl Klaus von der Decken =

German explorer

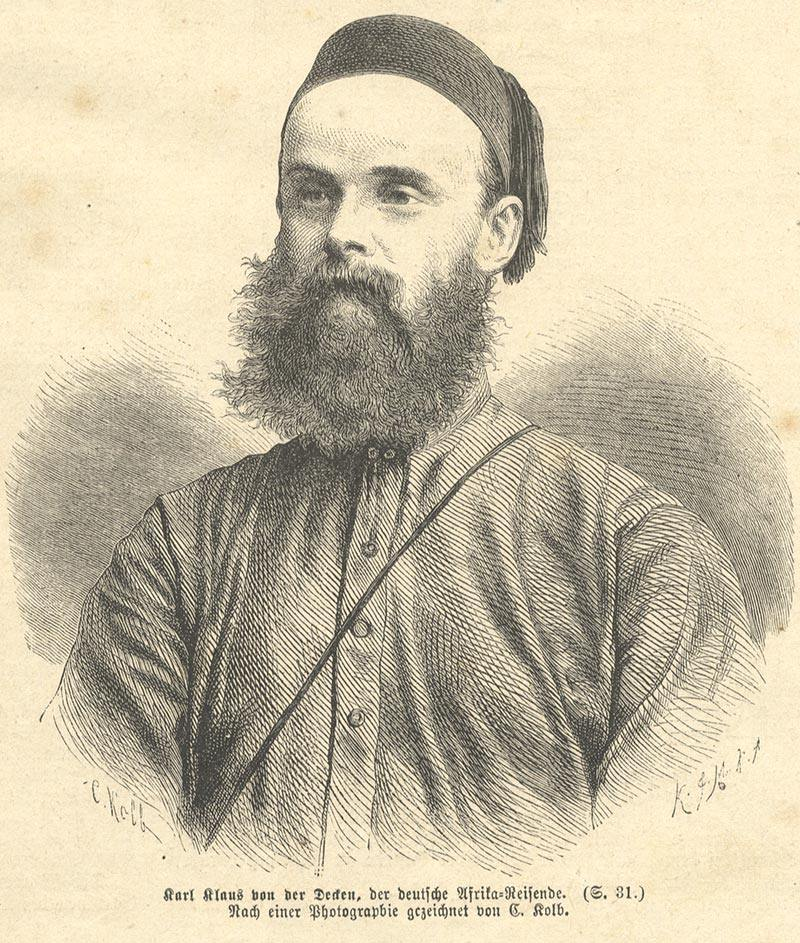
Karl Klaus von der Decken, woodcut by C. Kolb 1874

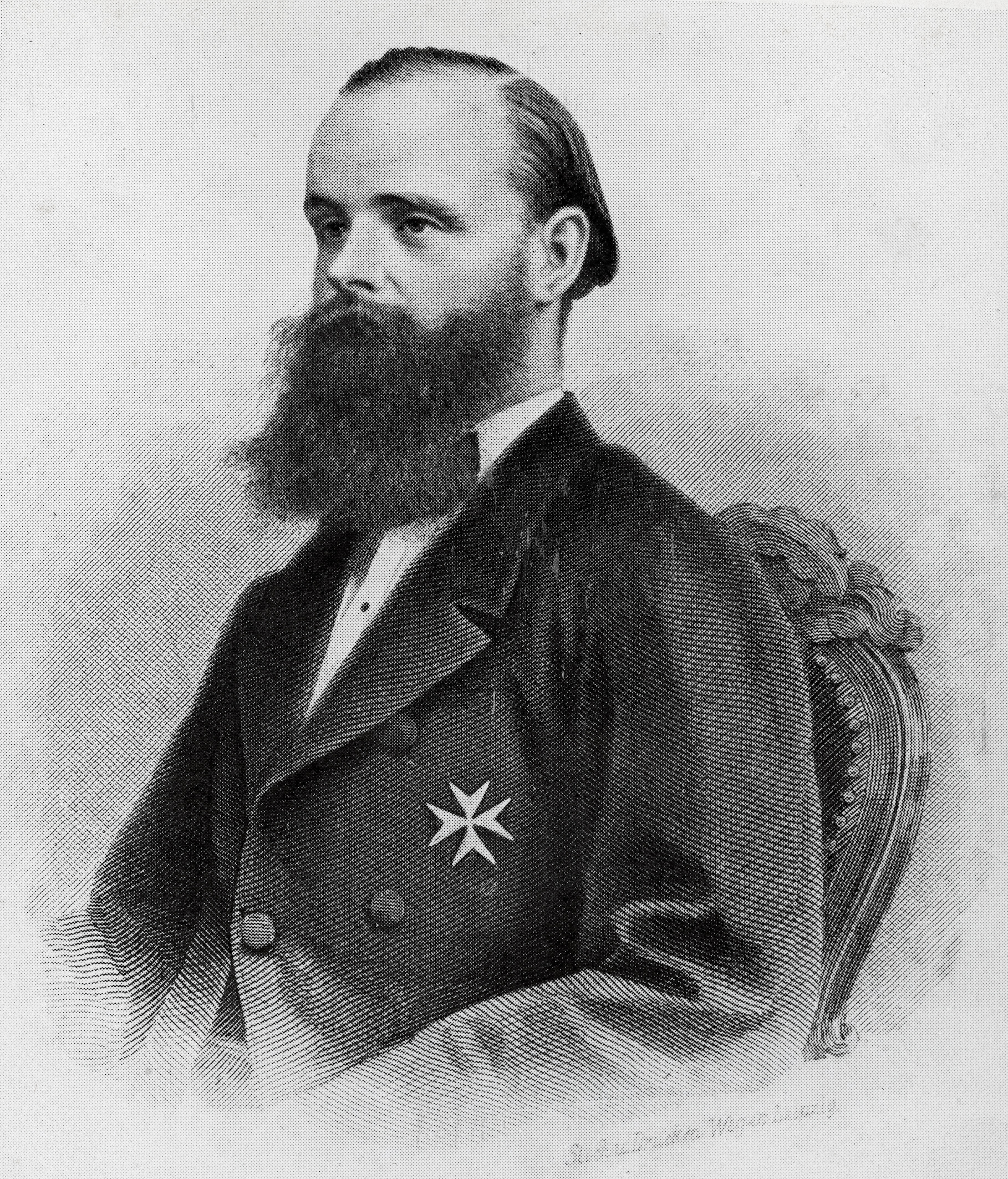
Karl Klaus von der Decken with Medal of the Order of Saint John

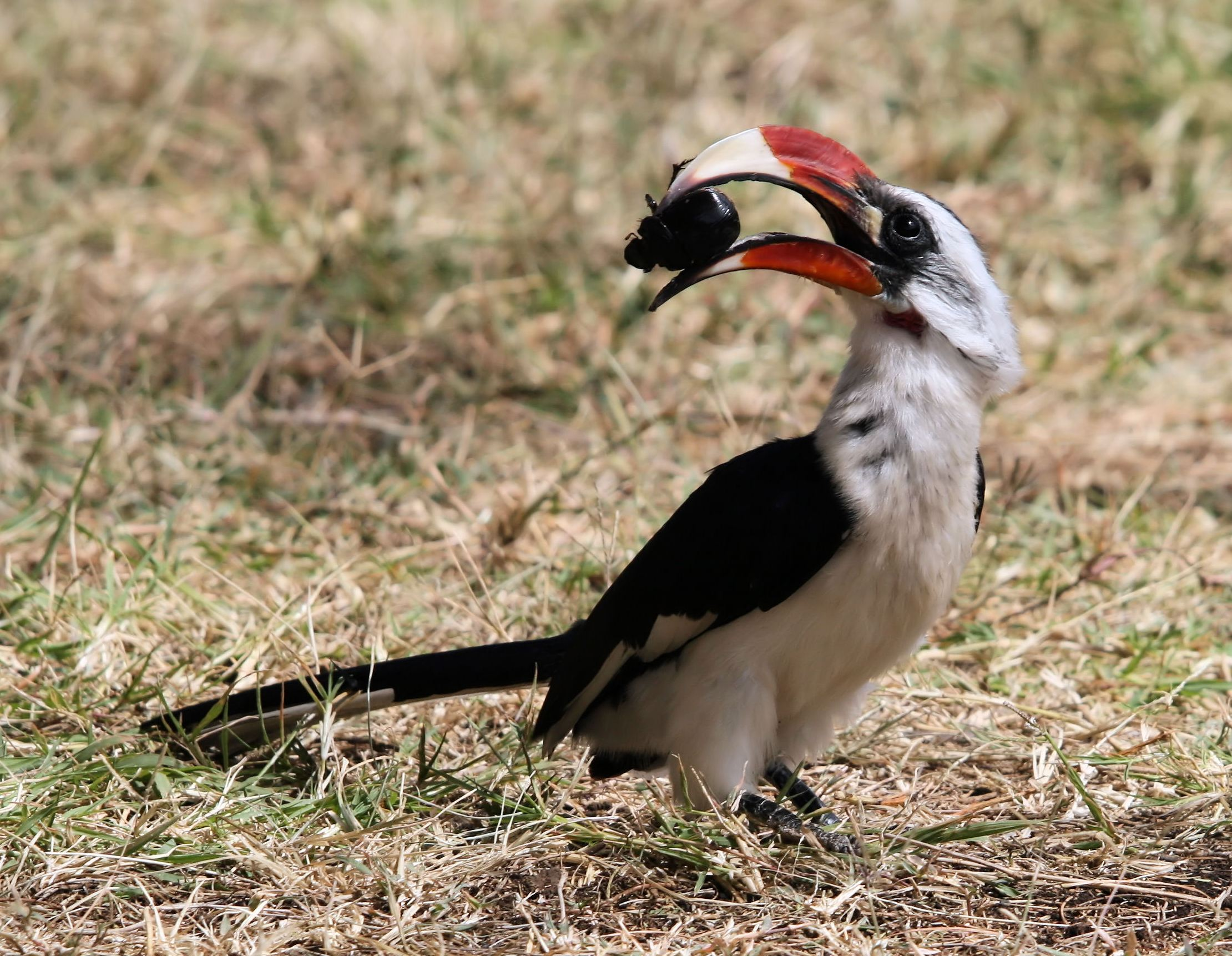
Von der Decken's hornbill male with a large insect, Serengeti National Park, Tanzania

Baron Karl Klaus (Carl Claus) von der Decken (8 August 1833 in Kotzen, Brandenburg, Germany – 2 October 1865 near Bardera, Somalia) was a German explorer of eastern Africa and the first European to attempt to climb Mount Kilimanjaro.

Following a stint in the military, von der Decken first travelled to eastern Africa in May 1860. There he explored the region around Lake Nyasa, only a year after David Livingstone had been the first European to reach the area. The following year, von der Decken set out from Mombasa to survey the Kilimanjaro massif. During the journey inland, he met the young English geologist Richard Thornton (1838–1863) – who had left Livingstone's Zambezi expedition – and invited him to accompany him to Kilimanjaro. When the massif loomed into view, it was the first time it had been sighted by Europeans since Johannes Rebmann had been the first European to see it in 1848.

Von der Decken and Thornton surveyed the area, accurately estimating Mount Kilimanjaro's height to be around 20,000 feet above sea level. However, when their party attempted to climb the mountain, poor weather kept them from gaining any more than a few thousand feet. On von der Decken's return the following year, this time accompanied by fellow German explorer and chemist Otto Kersten, their party's attempt to climb the mountain reached around 14,000 feet. Once again, however, deteriorating weather conditions (and, according to Kersten's account, uncooperative porters) prevented the party from climbing any higher. The expedition was not wholly in vain, however, as close observations of Kilimanjaro's snowcapped summit were made.

In 1863, von der Decken turned his attention away from Kilimanjaro and visited Madagascar and the Mascarene Islands off the coast of eastern Africa. In 1865, he visited Somalia and became one of the first Europeans to explore the lower reaches of the Jubba River, on board the small steamship Welf. After the Welf foundered in rapids beyond Bardera, he and three others in his party were murdered by local Somalis.

== Legacy ==
Although von der Decken failed to reach Mount Kilimanjaro's summit, his and Richard Thornton's data ended the debate as to whether there was any settled snow or ice in tropical Africa. During his 1862 expedition, von der Decken also became the first European to record a sighting of Mount Meru, located forty or so miles to the west of Mount Kilimanjaro. These achievements, together with his descriptions of the area – including that of the bird subsequently named after him, the Von der Decken's hornbill – earned von der Decken the Patron's Medal of the Royal Geographical Society in 1864. Lobelia deckenii, a species of giant lobelia native to the East African mountains, was also named after him.

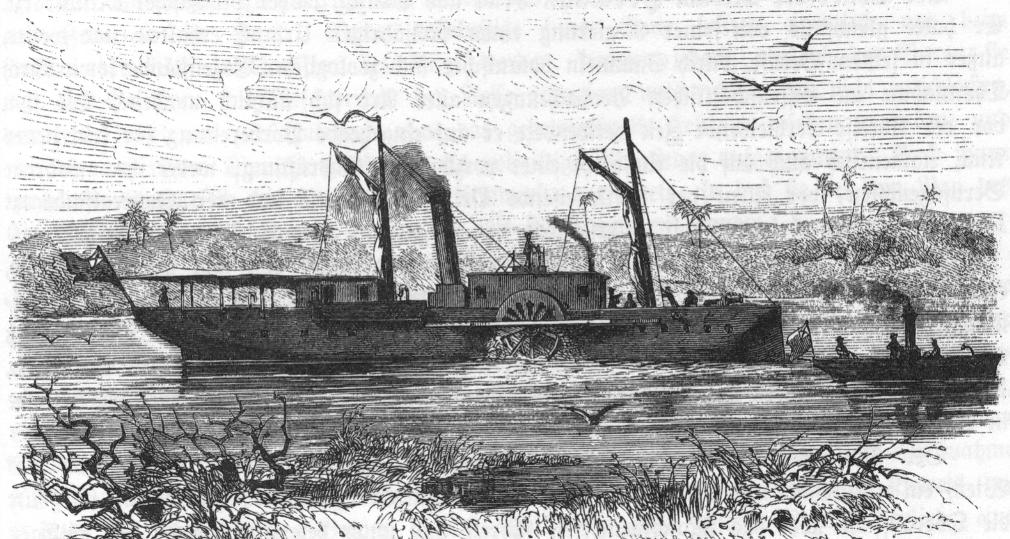
Steamship Welf on exploration of the Jubba River 36 m long and smaller boat 9 m long

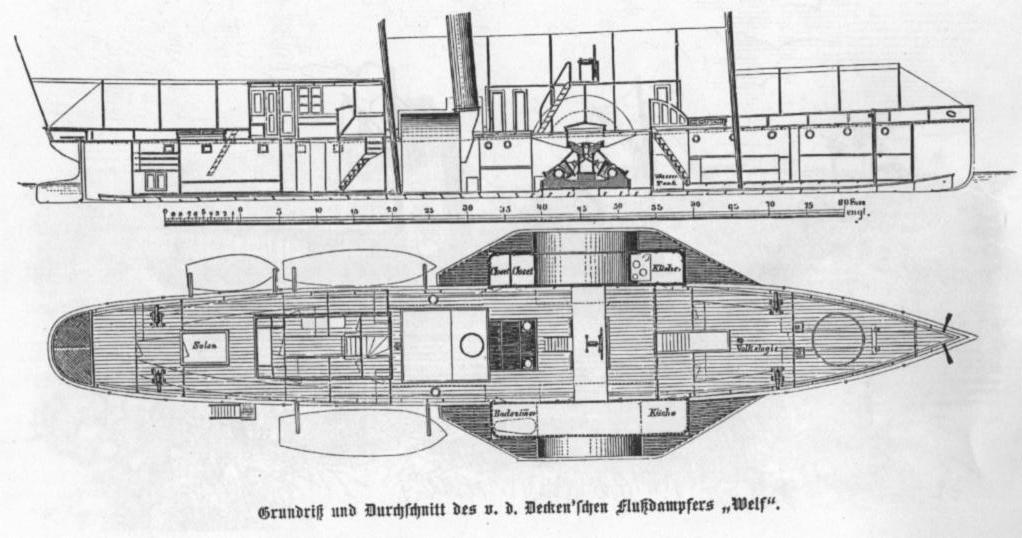
Steamship Welf construction plan

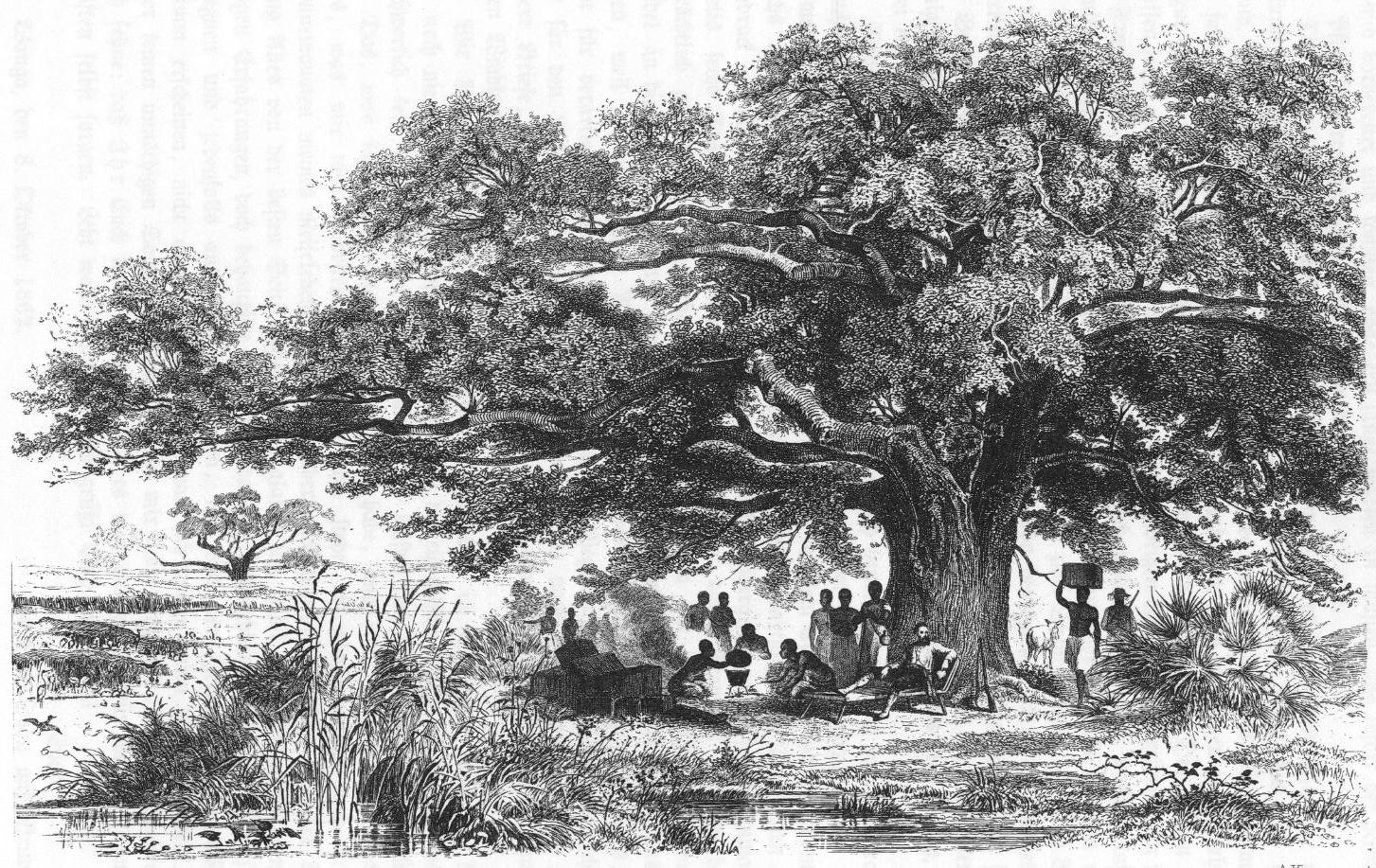
Rest Under a Big Tree

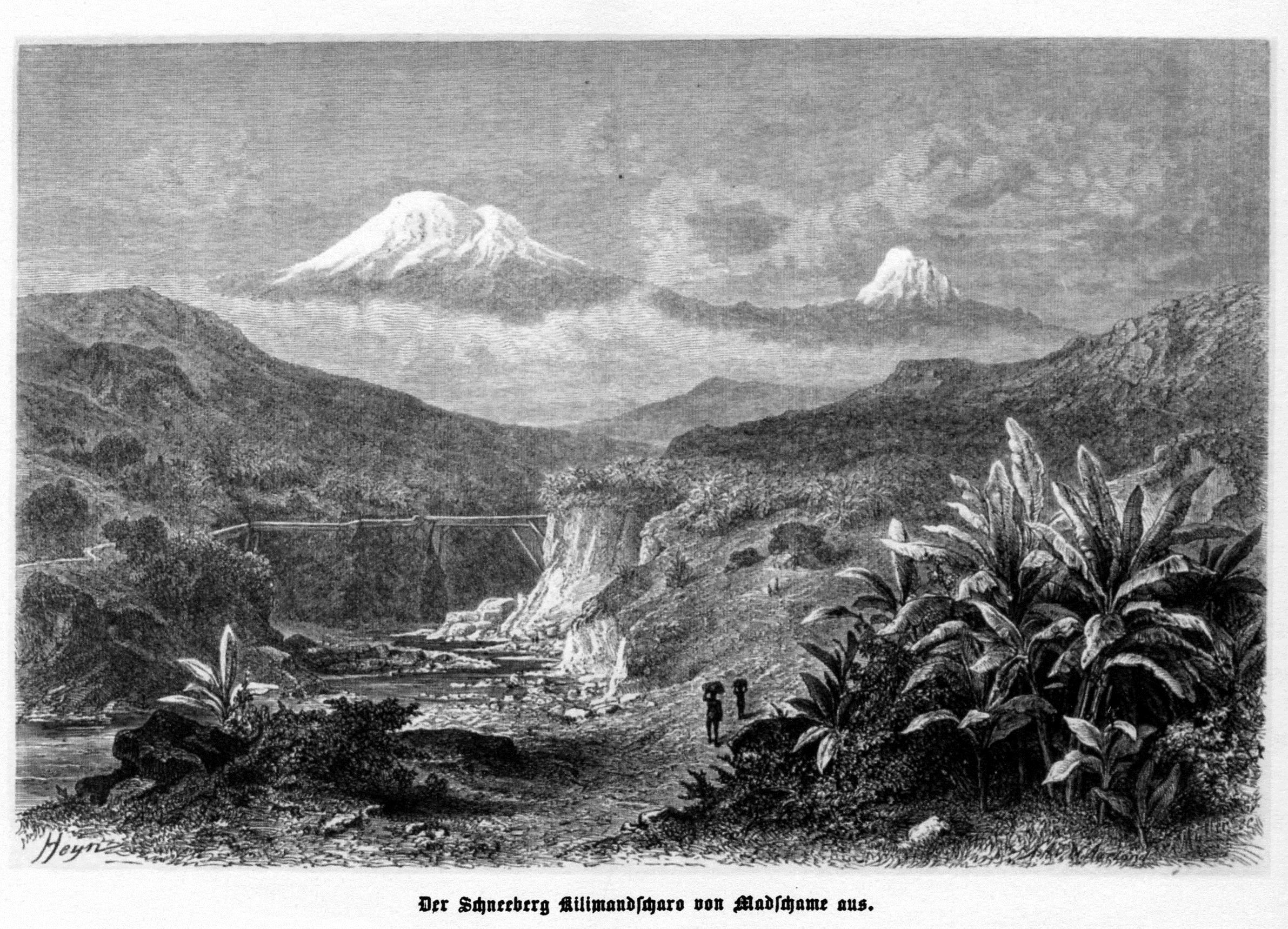
Kilimandscharo, woodcut 1869 by Ernst Heyn, was created with the help of a drawing by v. d. Decken

== Footnotes ==
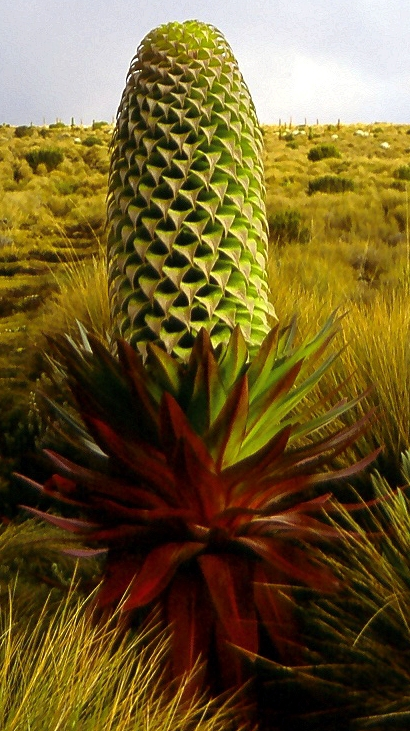
Lobelia deckenii at Kilimandjaro

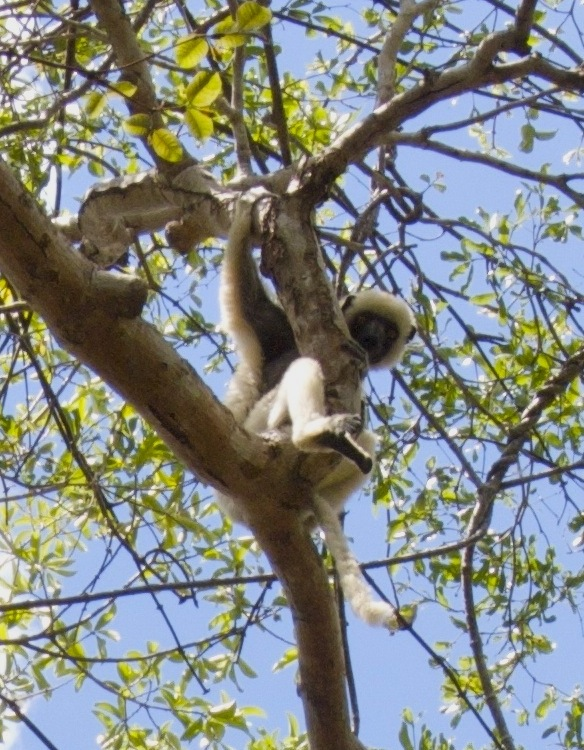
Von der Decken's sifaka These lemurs live only in Madagascar.

== Bibliography ==
Most of the literature is in German, so see books and articles in the German Wikipedia also

- Bernard Verdcourt: Collectors in East Africa – 31. Baron Carl Claus von der Decken 1833–1865 Text extracted from The Conchologists’ Newsletter, No.162, pp. 204–211 published September 2002
- Richard Thornton: in Proceedings of the Royal Geographical Society of London, volume 6 1861-1862 von Royal Geographical Society (Great Britain) pp. 47-51 Expedition to Kilimanjaro (in Company with the Baron von der Decken)
- Richard Thornton: in American Journal of Science: the first scientific journal in the United States: devoted to the geological sciences and to related fields, 1862 Band 34 pp. 87-89 Kilimanjaro, the Snow Covered Equatorial Peak of Africa
- Charles Dundas, Kilimanjaro and its People, London: Frank Cass Publishers, 1968 (ISBN 0-7146-1659-1; reprint of original 1924 edition).
- Vincenzo Meleca, Il misterioso relitto del fiume Giuba, in http://www.ilcornodafrica.it/st-meleca%20relitto%20giuba.pdf
