= Salzgitter-Ringelheim =

Ringelheim
- Quarter of Salzgitter
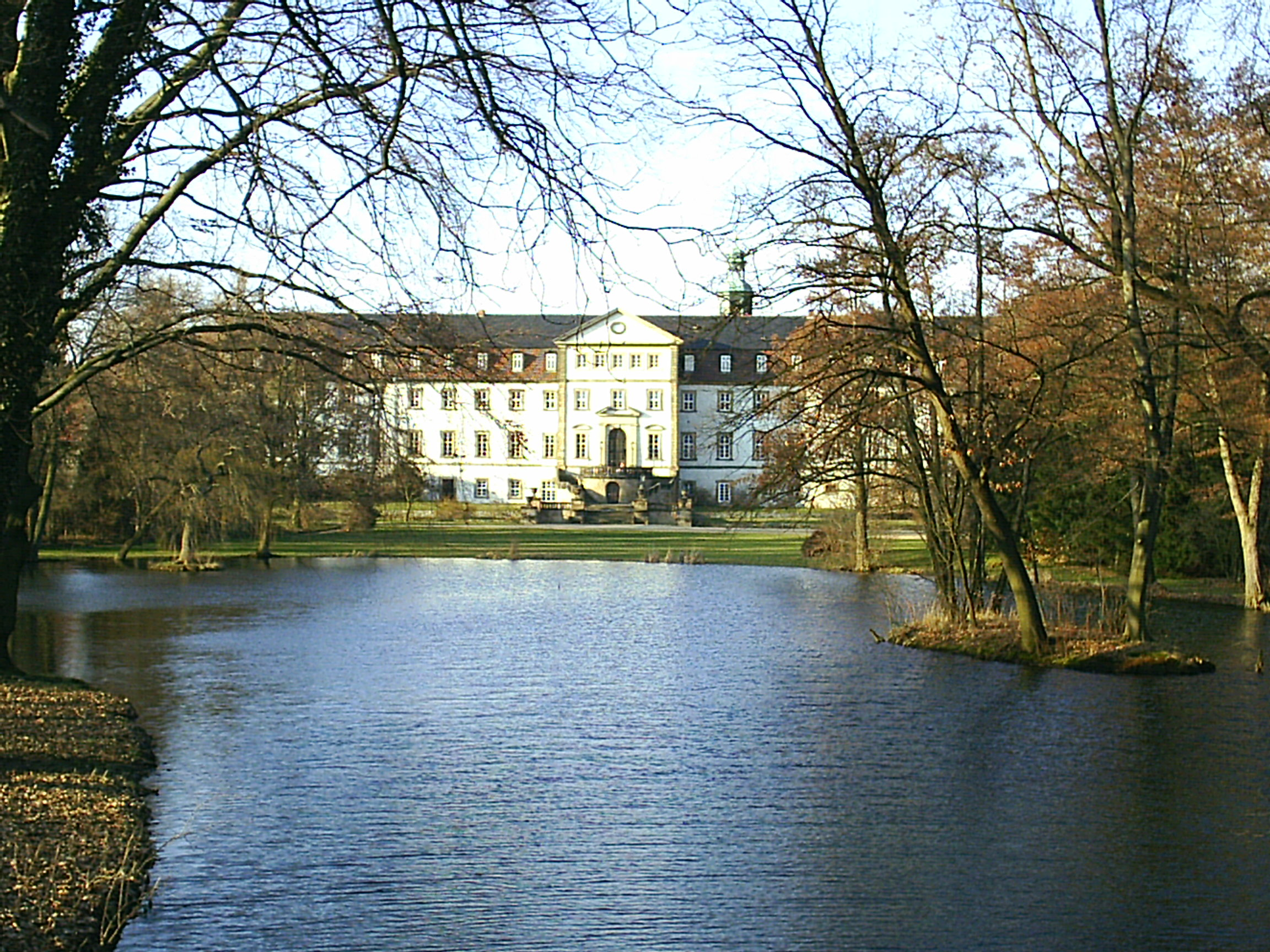
- Castle Ringelheim, Salzgitter, Germany

- Coat of arms

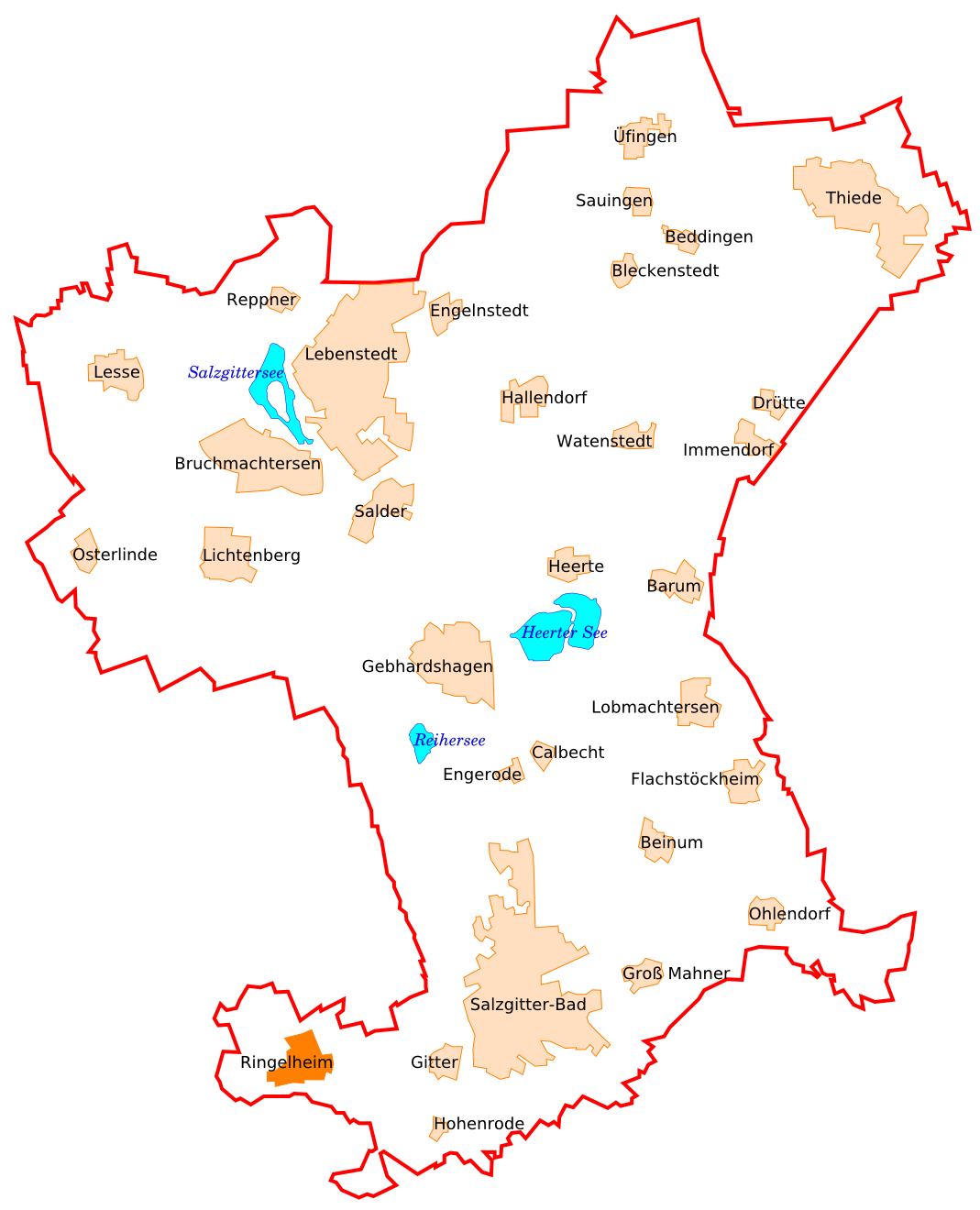
- Location of Ringelheim in Salzgitter
- Interactive map of Ringelheim
- Location within Germany Location within Lower Saxony
- Coordinates: 52°02′09″N 10°18′27″E
- Country: Germany
- State: Lower Saxony
- District: Urban district
- City: Salzgitter

Population (2020-12-31)
  - Total: 1,994
- Time zone: UTC+01:00 (CET)
  - Summer (DST): UTC+02:00 (CEST)
- Vehicle registration: SZ

Ringelheim is the sixth biggest quarter of Salzgitter in Lower Saxony, Germany. It is located on the Innerste River at the very far south-western end of the urban area, and has a population of 1,994. The Salzgitter-Ringelheim train station is the most important station of the city, as the Brunswick Southern Railway and the line from Hildesheim to Goslar cross here.

== History ==
The settlement arose in the Eastphalian Salzgau region of the medieval Duchy of Saxony; the Immedinger relatives of duchess consort Matilda, wife of Henry the Fowler, founded a nunnery here as a proprietary monastery about 940. The convent was re-established as a Benedictine friary subordinate to the Bishopric of Hildesheim in 1152.

Upon the Hildesheim Diocesan Feud, Prince-bishop John of Saxe-Lauenburg had to cede Ringelheim to the neighbouring Principality of Brunswick-Wolfenbüttel in 1523. With the accession of Duke Julius it turned Protestant in 1568. During the Thirty Years' War, Imperial and Catholic troops tried to reconquer the former Hildesheim estates and defeated a Protestant army under King Christian IV of Denmark at the nearby Battle of Lutter in 1626. Duke Augustus the Younger of Brunswick-Wolfenbüttel finally restored Ringelheim to Hildesheim in 1641.

In 1803 the prince-bishopric was securalised to the Electorate of Hanover and Feldzeugmeister Count Friedrich von der Decken acquired the former monastery as his residence in 1817. Ringelheim was incorporated into the City of Salzgitter in 1942.

== Sights ==
The most important attraction is Schloss Ringelheim, the former abbey founded in the tenth century and secularised in 1803. The large park (Schlosspark) with a serpentine lake in the English landscape garden manner was laid out in 1847 for Count Adolf von der Decken. Close to it there are the sport grounds and the River Innerste. The Baroque church of St. Abdon und Sennen built in 1694 is known for its precious organ and the crucifix from the workshop of Prince-bishop Bernward of Hildesheim.

Ringelheim has some shopping facilities (supermarket, drug-store, retail), restaurants, banks, doctor, dentist, pharmacy, an alcohol detox clinic and an institution for handicapped persons.

== Bibliography ==
- Jörg Leuschner, Reinhard Försterling, Renate Vanis, Christine Kellner-Depner, Walter Wimmer, Dirk Schaper. Ringelheim., Ed: Archiv der Stadt Salzgitter (= Beiträge zur Stadtgeschichte. Band 29). Salzgitter 2015.
