= The Duke of Wellington Describing the Field of Waterloo to George IV =

Painting by Benjamin Robert Haydon

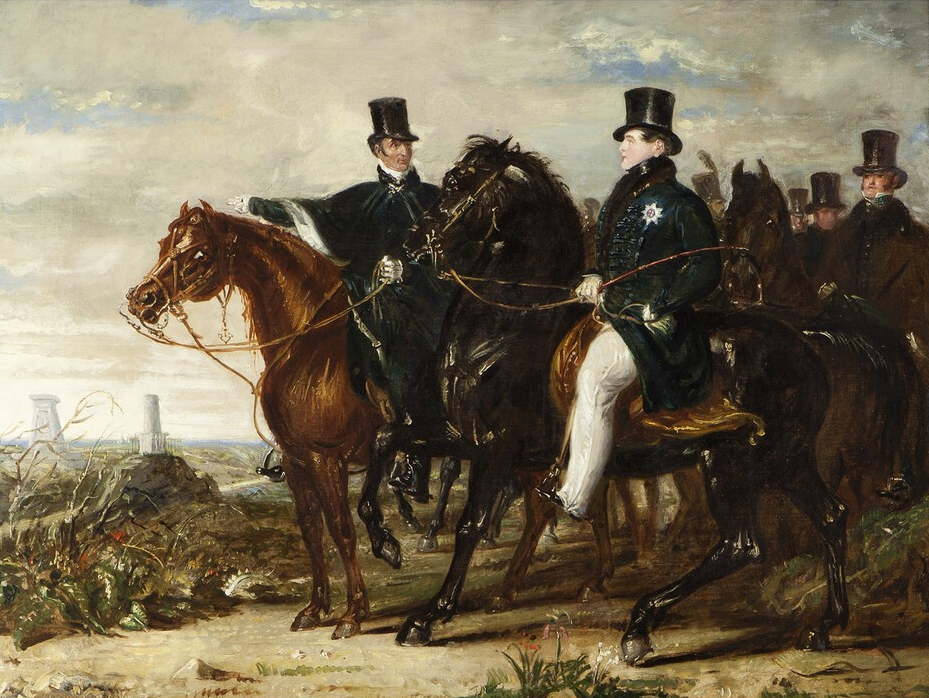
- Artist: Benjamin Robert Haydon
- Year: 1840
- Type: Oil on canvas, history painting
- Dimensions: 146 cm × 175 cm (57 in × 69 in)
- Location: Wellington Collection; Stratfield Saye

The Duke of Wellington Describing the Field of Waterloo to George IV is an oil on canvas history painting by the British artist Benjamin Robert Haydon, from 1840.

== History and description ==
It depicts a scene in 1821 when George IV was escorted around the site of the Battle of Waterloo, six years after it was fought, by the victorious Allied commander the Duke of Wellington. Haydon had visited the battlefield himself in 1839.

George IV was in Belgium, at the time part of the United Kingdom of the Netherlands, on his way to his state visit to Hanover. He was accompanied on some of the journey by Wellington, now a Tory politician. Wellington is shown mounted on Copenhagen. On the left of the pictures are the Gordon Monument and Hanoverian Monument.

The work was commissioned by Francis Bennoch and Richard Twentyman, two friends of Haydon's from the City of London. It was exhibited at the British Institution in 1845. Versions exist in both the Wellington Collection at Stratfield Saye House in Hampshire and at the Royal Hospital Chelsea in London.

== Bibliography ==
- Joliffe, John. Neglected Genius: The Diaries of Benjamin Robert Haydon, 1808–1846. Faber & Faber, 2012.
- Newall, Christopher & Bukantas, Ann. Pre-Raphaelites: Beauty and Rebellion. Oxford University Press, 2016.
- O'Keeffe, Paul. A Genius for Failure: The life of Benjamin Robert Haydon. Random House, 2011.
- Wellesley, Charles. Wellington Portrayed. Unicorn Press, 2014.
