= George Charles Augustus =

British Officer of Hanoverian Nobility

Georg Carl August du Plat
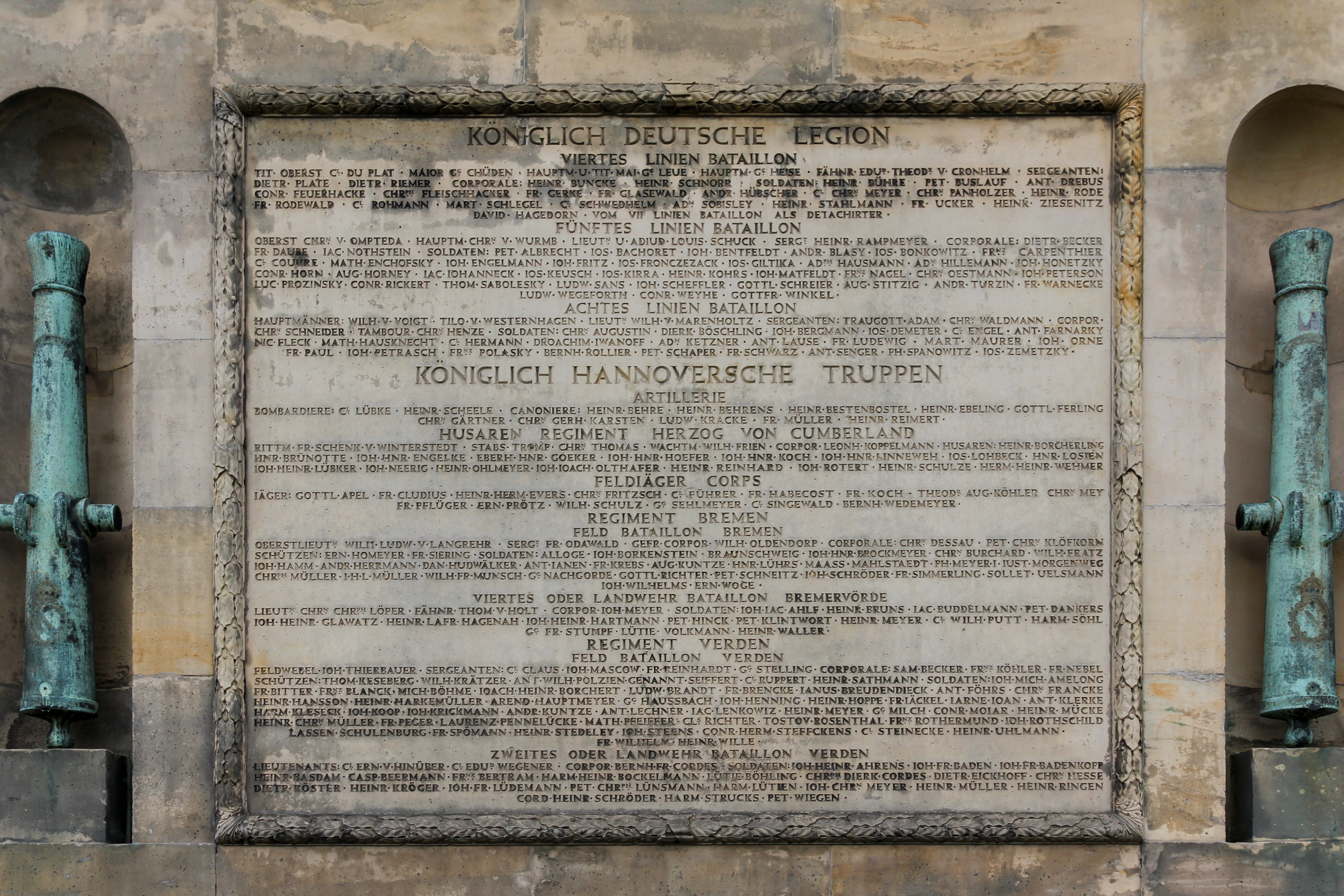
- Commemorative plaque on the Waterloo Column in Hanover with the heading 'King’s German Legion / Fourth Line Battalion', followed first by the French name of the titular Colonel Charles du Plat
- Born: 3 March 1770; Hanover
- Died: 21 June 1815 (aged 45); Brussels, Belgium
- Cause of death: Hostile fire
- Military career
- Allegiance: (Kingdom of Hanover) Hanover; British Army
- Service years: 1790–1815
- Rank: Colonel
- Nickname: George Charles Augustus
- Unit: King's German Legion
- Commands: 1st Brigade, King's German Legion
- Conflicts: Peninsular War; Hanover 1805; Baltic 1807; Sicily 1808–1812; Battle of Waterloo

Georg Carl August du Plat (1770–1815) was a Hanoverian Officer who commanded the King's German Legion of the British army at the Battle of Waterloo.

== Early life ==
Georg Carl August du Plat was born on 3 March 1770 in Hanover., then part of the Electorate of Brunswick-Lüneburg within the Holy Roman Empire.

The du Plat family, which traced its origins to Pierre Joseph du Plat (1657–1709), a French nobleman who settled in Germany. he du Plat family produced several officers who served in Hanoverian, British, and Danish military service during the 18th and early 19th centuries.

Georg Carl August was the son of Lieutenant General Georg Josua du Plat (1722–1795), a senior officer in the Hanoverian army, and Bernhardine von Derenthall (1749–1782).

== Career ==
=== Early military eareer ===
Du Plat entered the Hanoverian Army as a captain in the 1st Infantry Regiment, prior to the formation of the King's German Legion. He joined the British Service in King's German Legion with temporary rank in the army in 1803. He was promoted to a major in 4th Line Battalion in 1804 and lieutenant colonel 4th line battalion in 1807. Due to his exemplary service, he secured a permanent rank in British Army in 1812, breveted to colonel 1813. His early service included posting in Hanover (1805) and campaigns of Baltic expedition (1807) and Sicily (1808–1812).

=== Peninsular War and Hundred Days ===
During the Peninsular War, his regiment served on the east coast of Spain (1812–1814). After the return of Napoleon Bounaparte from his abdication during the Hundred Days Colonel Georg Carl August du Plat serving in the King's German Legion (KGL). By 1815, du Plat had risen to command the 1st Brigade of the KGL, which formed part of Major General Sir Charles Alten's 3rd Division under the Duke of Wellington. During the Battle of Waterloo his brigade was deployed on Wellington's left-center, near the La Haye Sainte farm, which was a key strongpoint of the Brussels Road. On 6 June, Wellington wrote of him, "[he can] always be relied on to keep his head". His troops defended the approaches to La Haye Sainte. His brigade constantly absorbed repeated assaults of the Imperial Guard and D'Erlon's Corps Du Plat was mortally wounded during the battle, likely in the early afternoon during the French infantry assaults.

== Death ==
Du Plat was evacuated to Brussels, where he died of his wounds on 21 June 1815, three days after the battle.
