= La Haye Sainte =

Walled farmhouse compound that played a crucial part in the Battle of Waterloo

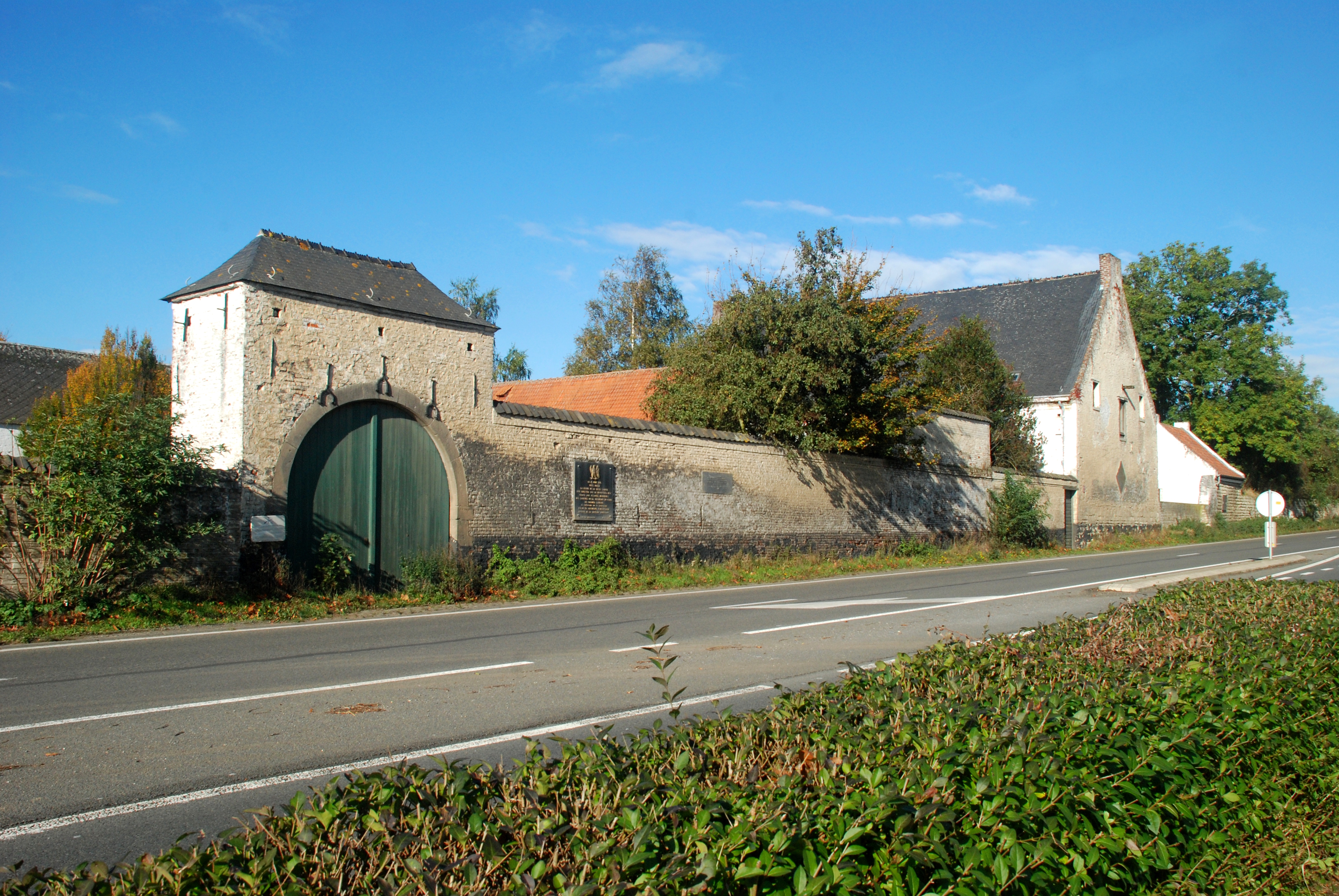
- La Haye Sainte as seen from the road

General information
- Location: N5 road (Belgium), near Waterloo, Belgium
- Coordinates: 50.677906°N 4.412066°E
- Owner: Private

Technical details
- Material: Sandstone and red brick

Design and construction
- Known for: Battle of Waterloo

La Haye Sainte (French pronunciation: [la ɛ sɛ̃t], lit. 'The Holy Hedge', named either after Jesus' crown of thorns or a nearby bramble hedge) is a walled farmhouse compound at the foot of an escarpment near Waterloo, Belgium, on the N5 road connecting Brussels and Charleroi. It has changed very little since it played a crucial part in the Battle of Waterloo on 18 June 1815.

La Haye Sainte was defended by about 400 King's German Legion troops during the Battle of Waterloo. Being greatly outnumbered by attacking French forces, the defenders held out until the late afternoon when they retired as their ammunition had run out. If Napoleon Bonaparte's army had captured La Haye Sainte earlier in the day, he would have almost certainly broken through the allied centre and defeated the Duke of Wellington's army.

The capture of La Haye Sainte in the early evening then gave the French the advantage of a defensible position from which to launch a potentially decisive attack on the Allied centre. However, Napoleon was too late—by this time, Blücher and the Prussian army had arrived on the battlefield and the outnumbered French army was defeated.

== History ==
La Haye Sainte was originally built before 1536. Much of the complex was rebuilt in the 1700s.

=== Battle of Waterloo ===
The road leads from La Belle Alliance, where Napoleon had his headquarters on the morning of the battle, through where the centre of the French front line was located, to a crossroads on the ridge which is at the top of the escarpment and then on to Brussels. The Duke of Wellington placed the majority of his forces on either side of the Brussels road behind the ridge on the Brussels side. This kept most of his forces out of sight of the French artillery.

Both Napoleon and Wellington made crucial mistakes about La Haye Sainte as it was fought over and around during most of the day. Napoleon failed to allocate enough forces to take the farm earlier in the day while Wellington only realized the strategic value of the position when it was almost too late.

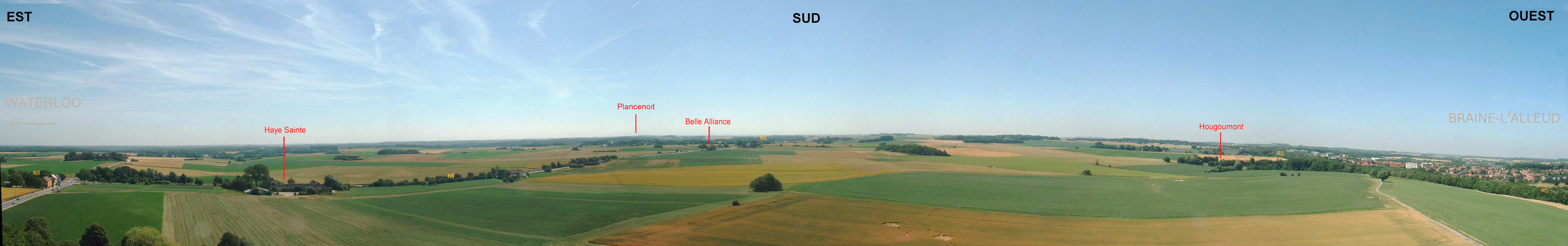
A panorama of the Waterloo battlefield today, including La Haye Sainte's position.

==== Defensive preparations ====
Wellington ordered the 2nd Light Infantry Battalion of the King’s German Legion, commanded by Major Georg Baring, to garrison La Haye Sainte the evening before the battle. Upon arriving at 19:30 amidst heavy rain, Baring ordered the men to begin fortifying the farm complex for defence, in anticipation of an attack the next morning.

Defensive preparations began again before dawn, however it was found the main door to the courtyard of the farm was removed for use as firewood by the occupying troops during the night. In addition, there were few suitable tools to construct defences and Baring's pioneers had been sent to aid the fortification of the nearby Hougoumont farmhouse. This meant that the strengthening of the farm’s defences would have to be largely improvised.

The majority of the King's German Legion troops were armed with the Baker rifle with rifled barrels, (a small minority armed with light muskets) as opposed to the standard smoothbore Brown Bess musket of the British Army. The French troops also used muskets which were quicker to load than the Baker rifle but the latter was more accurate and had about twice the range of a musket.

==== French attacks ====
A map of the Battle of Waterloo, showing La Haye Sainte at the centre, in front of D'Erlon's left flank

At 13:00, the French Grand Battery of heavy artillery opened fire before d'Erlon's Corps (54th and 55th Ligne) marched forward in columns. The French managed to surround La Haye Sainte and despite taking heavy casualties from the garrison, they attacked the centre left of Wellington's line. As the centre began to give way and La Haye Sainte became vulnerable, Picton's division was sent to plug the gap. As the French were beaten back from La Haye Sainte, the heavy cavalry brigades under Somerset and Ponsonby attacked. As the French were repulsed, an eleven year old drummer boy was captured by the British. This action relieved the pressure on the fortress farm.

At 15:00, Napoleon ordered Marshal Ney to capture La Haye Sainte. While Ney was engaged in the glorious but futile 8,000-man cavalry attack, unsupported by infantry or cannon, on Allied squares on the Brussels side of the ridge, he failed to take La Haye Sainte. During the battle, the KGL were supported by the 1/2 Nassau Regiment and the light company of the 5th Line Battalion KGL.

At 17:30, Napoleon re-issued orders for Ney to take La Haye Sainte. The French had worked up close to the buildings by this time.

==== French capture and final assault ====
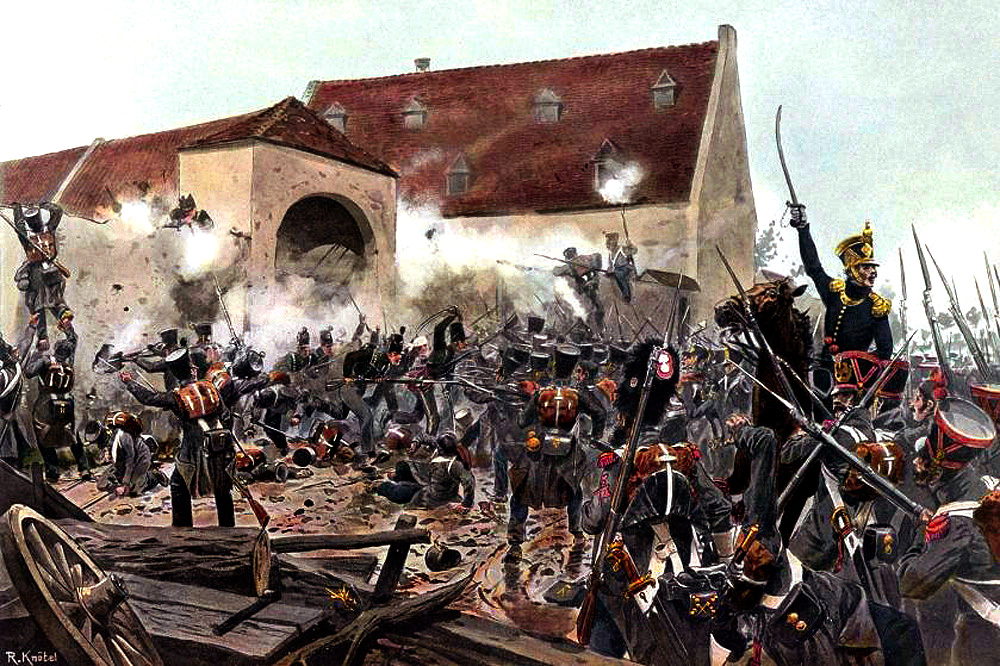
The Storming of La Haye Sainte, by Richard Knötel.

At 18:00 Marshal Ney, heavily supported by artillery and some cavalry, took personal command of an infantry regiment (13th Legere) and a company of engineers and captured La Haye Sainte with a furious assault. "The light battalion of the German Legion, which occupied it, had expended all its ammunition" and had to retreat.

At 19:00, thanks to the French garrison in La Haye Sainte, the Imperial Guard was able to climb the escarpment and attack the Allies on the Brussels side of the ridge. This final attack was beaten back and became a rout around 20:10 as the French forces realised that with the arrival of the Prussians from the east, they were beaten. During the French retreat, La Haye Sainte was recaptured by the Allies, some time before 21:00, when Blücher met Wellington at La Belle Alliance.

== Modern La Haye Sainte ==
La Haye Sainte has changed very little since the Battle of Waterloo. Today it is privately owned. On the walls are memorials to the King's German Legion and the French. Opposite the house is a monument for the officers and the soldiers of the KGL.

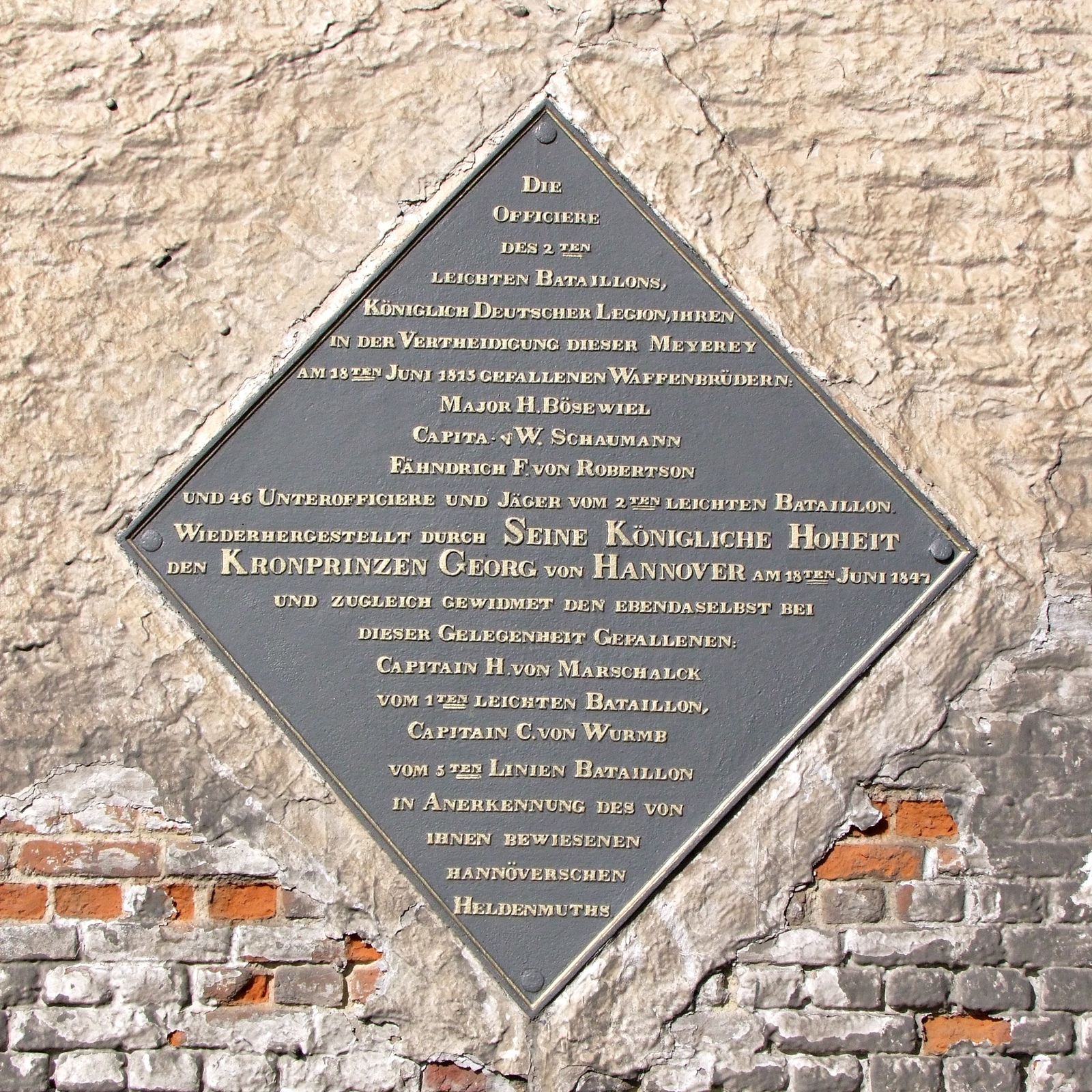
Plaque embedded in 1847 in honour of the King's German Legion and all those who died in the battle

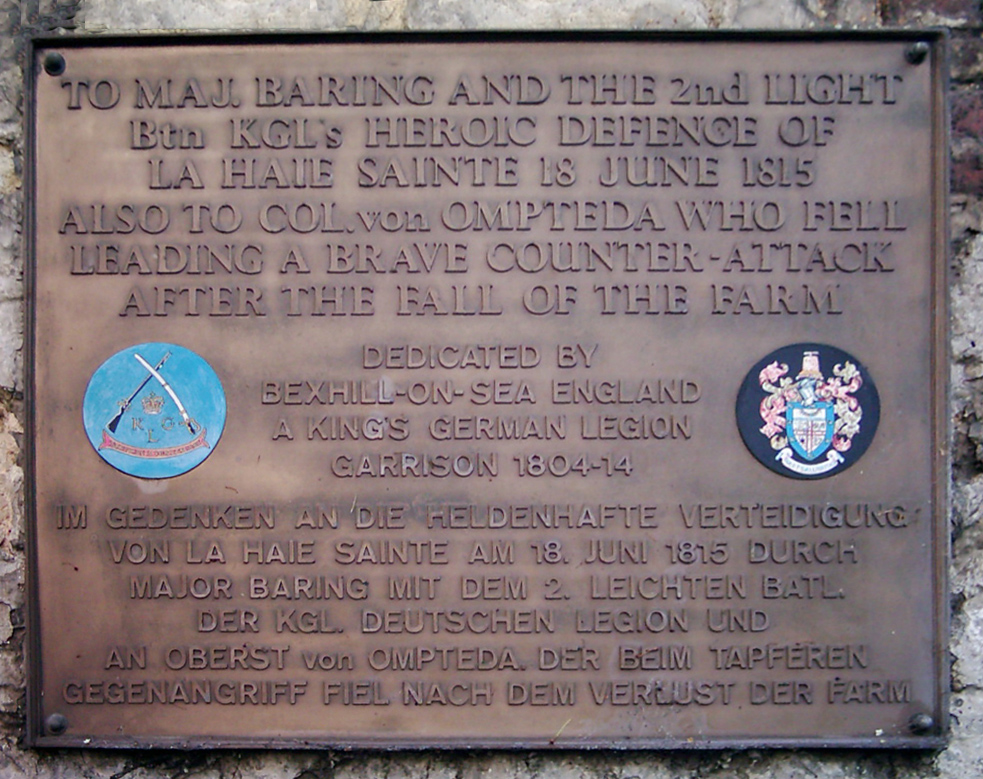
Plaque for the KGL on the outer wall of La Haye Sainte

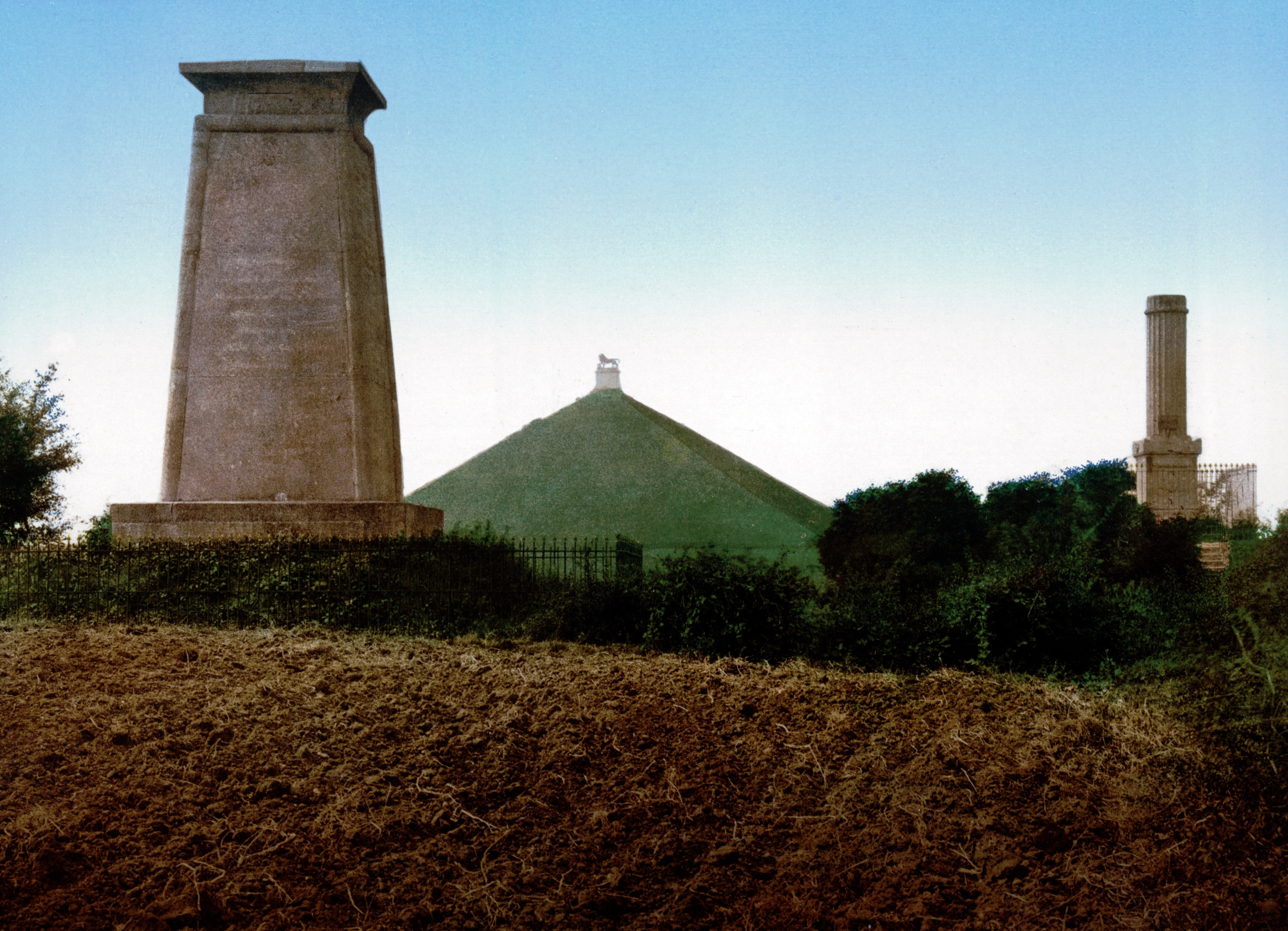
Monuments next to La Haye Sainte - the one on the left, the Hanoverian Monument, is for the KGL while the one on the right, the Gordon Monument, is dedicated to Wellington's ADC.

== See also ==
- List of Waterloo Battlefield locations
