= Georg Baring =

British-Hanoverian milirary commander

Konrad Ludwig Georg Baring
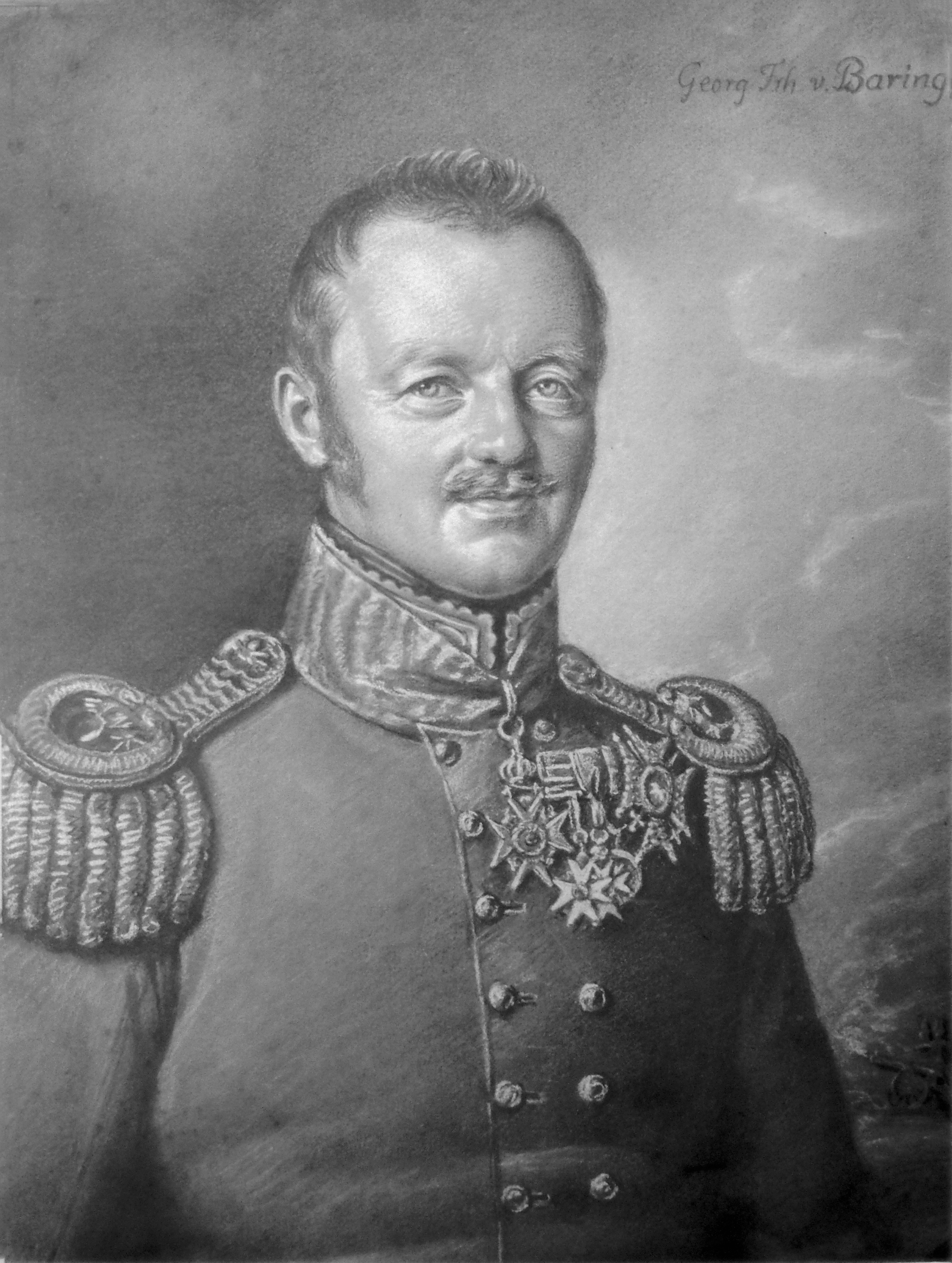
- Georg von Baring
- Born: 8 March 1773; Hannover
- Died: 27 February 1848 (aged 74) Wiesbaden
- Allegiance: Electorate of Hanover, United Kingdom
- Branch: Hanoverian Army, King's German Legion
- Service years: 1787–1846
- Rank: Generalleutnant
- Commands: 2nd Light Infantry Battalion, King's German Legion
- Conflicts: Peninsular War, Battle of Waterloo
- Awards: Knight Companion of the Order of the Bath, Waterloo Medal, Royal Guelphic Order (2nd class), King William Cross, Military William Order (3rd class)

Konrad Ludwig Georg Baring (8 March 1773, Hannover – 27 February 1848, Wiesbaden, during a spa treatment) was an officer in the army of the Electorate of Hanover and the British army's King's German Legion. Some sources also give his name as Baron Georg(e) von Baring.

== Life ==
=== To 1815 ===
Baring's military career began with his joining the Hanoverian Army in 1787. In November 1803 (dating the commission to 17 November) he became a brevet major in the King's Germans (renamed the King's German Legion on 19 December 1803), a force of which he had been one of the first members. He fought in the campaigns in Hannover (1805, Third Coalition), the Baltic (1807–08, Gunboat War / English Wars), the Pyrenees (1808–13, Peninsular War), the Walcheren Campaign (1809, Fifth Coalition), southern France (1813–14, Sixth Coalition) and the Netherlands (1814, Sixth Coalition). On 16 May 1811 he was slightly wounded at the battle of Albuera. On 18 June 1815 he was promoted to lieutenant colonel.

=== Waterloo ===
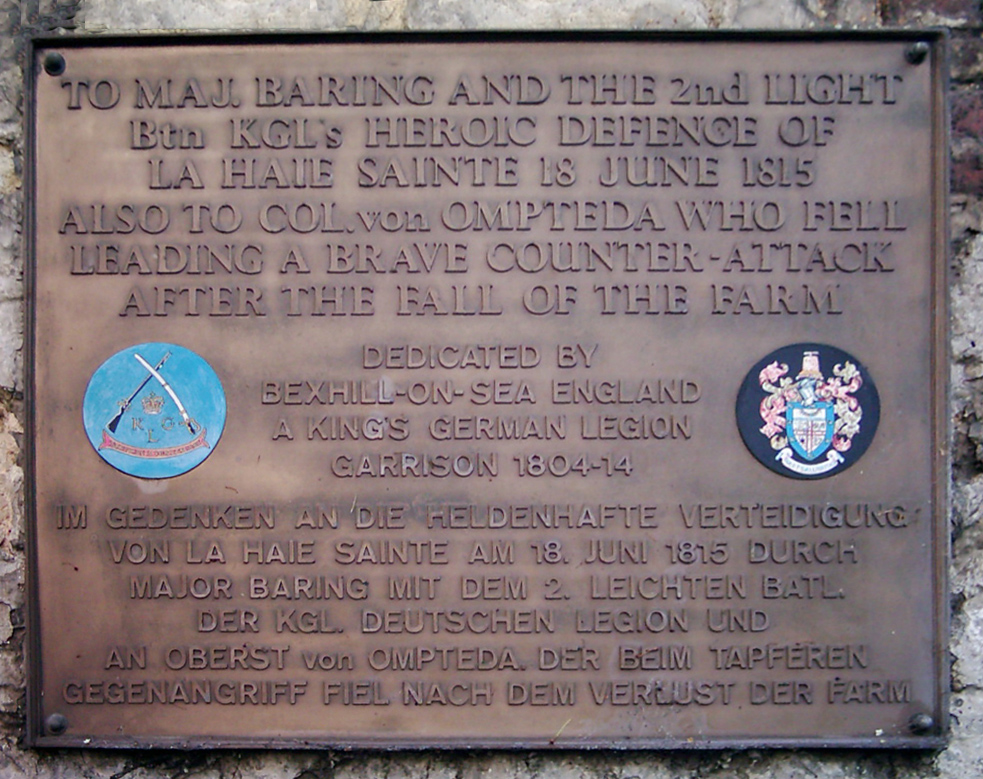
Plaque to Baring, Von Ompteda and the Legion on the outer wall of La Haye Sainte

At the head of the 2nd Light Infantry Battalion of the Legion, Baring was put in charge of the defence of the farmhouse of La Haye Sainte during the battle of Waterloo on 18 June 1815. He wrote about the events of the day in a detailed report, which ended with the words:

The Division, which was terribly tired and had suffered infinitely, spent the night lying on the battlefield, and of the 400 men with which I had entered the battle I now had no more than 42. According to who I could ask, the answers came: dead! – wounded! – I freely admit that I instinctively wept tears at this news and also at so great a bitterness I felt helplessly take possession of me. I was roused from these sad thoughts by the general-quartermaster of our division, Major Shaw, who was my trusted friend. I felt exhausted in the highest degree and my leg was very painful; with my friend I lay down in some straw, which the men had gathered for us to sleep on. On waking, we found ourselves between a dead man and a dead horse. But I will pass over these scenes of the battlefield with their misery and grief in silence.
We buried our dead friends and comrades; among them was the commander of the brigade, Oberst von Ompteda, and many a brave man. After we had boiled something up and our men had just about recovered, we left the battlefield in pursuit of the enemy.

=== After Waterloo ===
The King's German Legion was dissolved after Waterloo and Baring joined the newly formed army of the Kingdom of Hanover, in which he became oberst in the Garde-Grenadier-Regiment (26 December 1828) and from 1830 as Flügel-Adjutant in the general staff. In 1831, the year in which his Erzählung der Teilnahme des 2. Leichten Bataillons der Kgl. Deutschen Legion an der Schlacht von Waterloo (History of the Participation of the 2nd Light Infantry Battalion of the King's German Legion at the Battle of Waterloo) was published in a Hanoverian military journal, he held the rank of Brigade-Kommandeur. On 18 June 1832, the seventeenth anniversary of Waterloo, he and his descendants were made Freiherrs by William IV (then still king of Hanover) in recognition of his war service and made Hanover's city commander. In 1834 he rose to Generalmajor then in 1846 to Generalleutnant.

== Memorials ==
A street in Hanover city-centre is named after him and a small memorial stone is dedicated in front of the Hauptstaatsarchiv Hannover near the present-day regional parliament and the former royal palace.

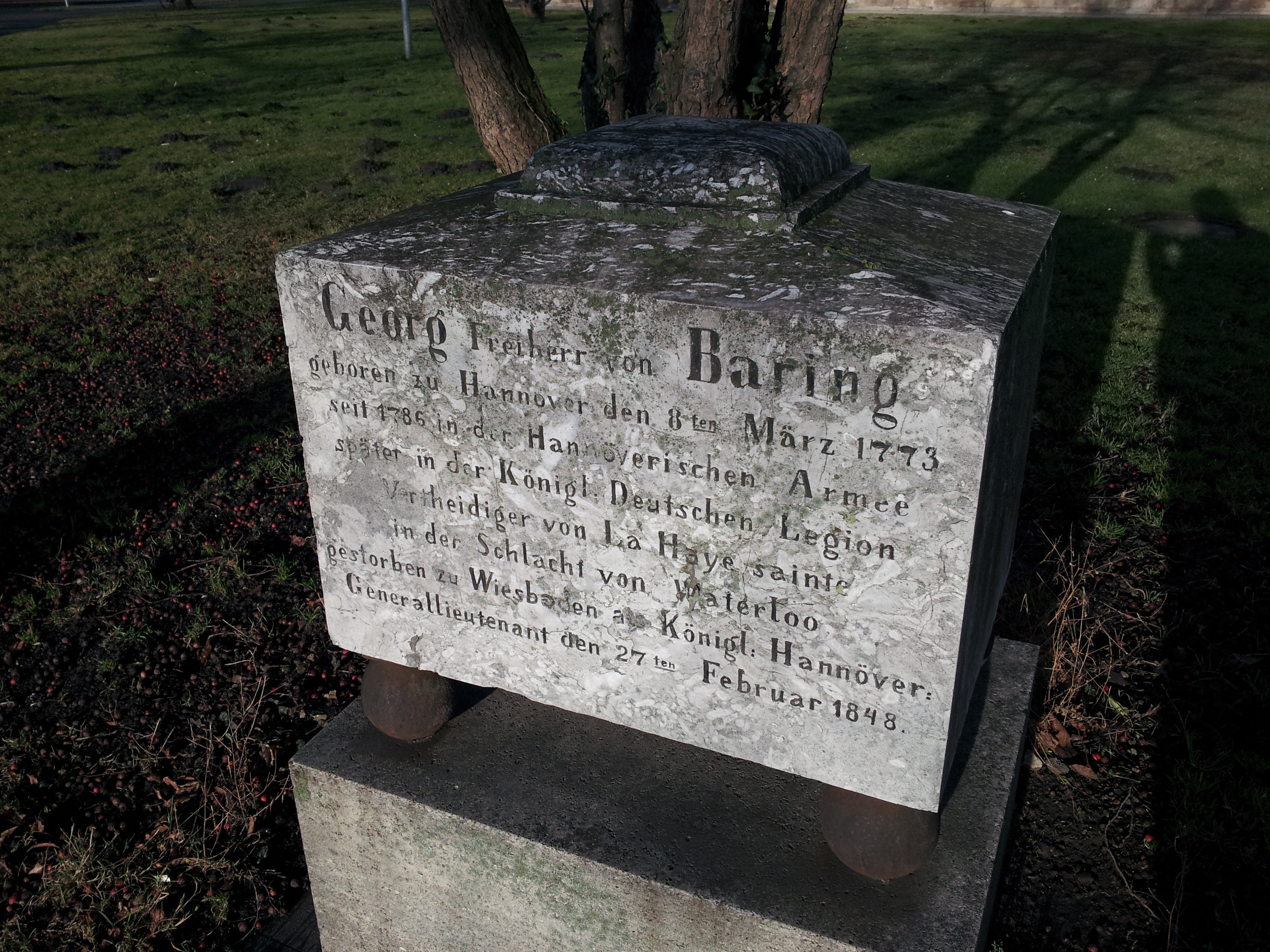
Plaque to Georg Baring in Hanover

== Honours ==
- United Kingdom
  - CB – Knight Companion of the Order of the Bath
  - Waterloo Medal
- Kingdom of Hannover
  - Royal Guelphic Order, 2nd class
  - King William Cross
- Kingdom of the Netherlands
  - Military William Order, 3rd class

== Bibliography ==
- N. Ludlow Beamish; History of the King's German Legion Vol. 2. 1832-37 (new edition: Naval and Military Press 1997 ISBN 0-9522011-0-0)
- Mike Chappell; The King's German Legion (2) 1812-1816. Osprey 2000 ISBN 1-85532-997-2
- Peter Hofschröer; The Waterloo Campaign – The German Victory. Greenhill Books London (1999) ISBN 1-85367-368-4
- Friedrich Lindau, Erinnerungen eines Soldaten aus den Feldzügen der Königlich – deutschen Legion: Ein Bürger Hamelns erzählt aus der Zeit 1806 bis 1815. AUREL Verlag, Daun 2006 ISBN 3-938759-02-X
- Jens Mastnak: Diese denckwürdige und mörderische Schlacht – Die Hannoveraner bei Waterloo, Celle 2003 ISBN 3-925902-48-1
- Klaus Mlynek in Hannoversches Biographisches Lexikon. Von den Anfängen bis in die Gegenwart. Hannover: Schlüter 2002, S. 39f. ISBN 3-87706-706-9
- Bernhard Schwertfeger; Geschichte der Königlich Deutschen Legion 1803-1816 2. Band. Hahn‘sche Buchhandlung 1907
- Staats- und Adelskalender für das Königreich Hannover auf das Jahr 1830
