= Roter Faden =

Urban walking trail in Hanover, Lower Saxony

Red Thread
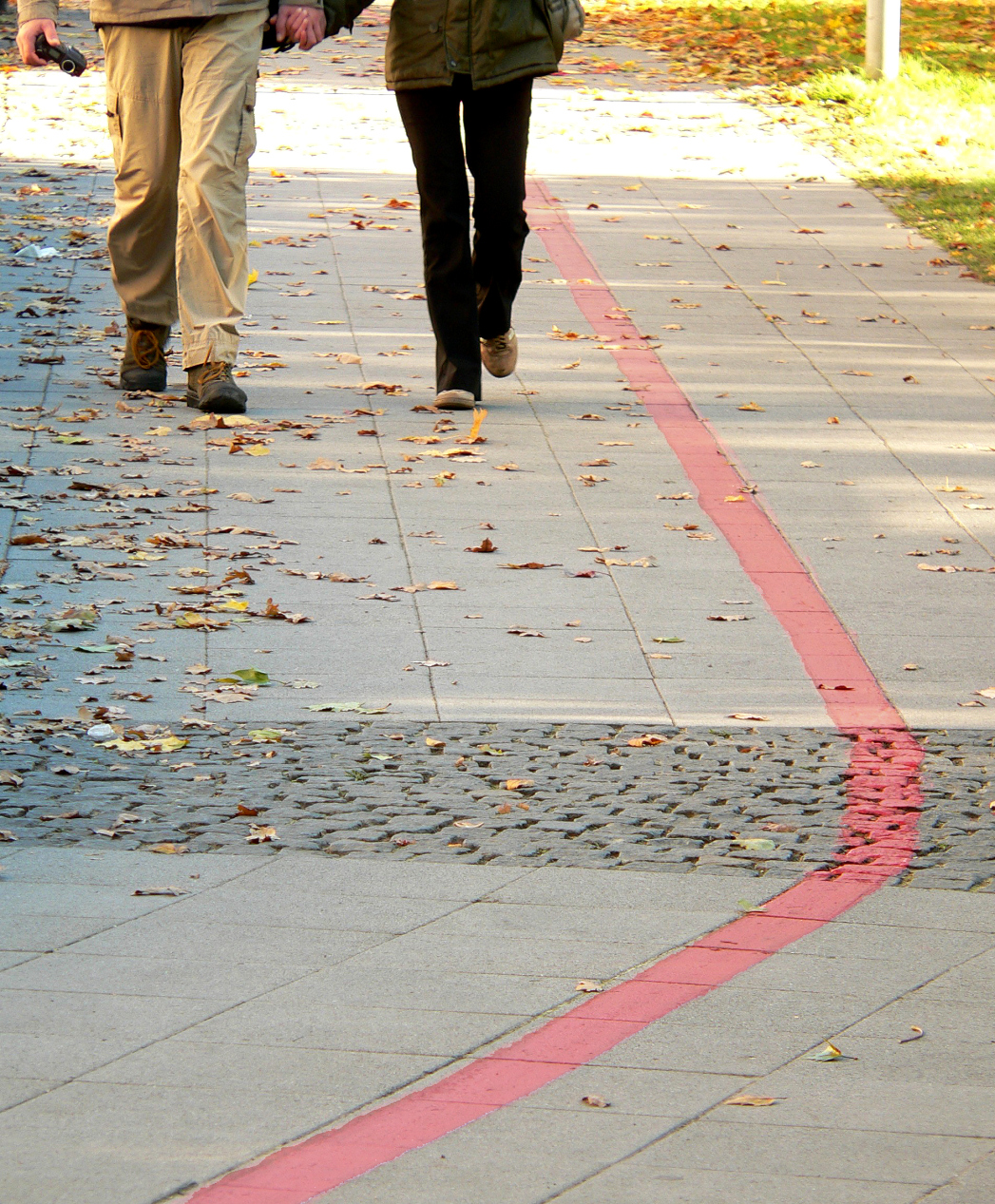
- Red Thread on pedestrian walkway in Hanover
- Length: 4.2 km (2.6 mi)
- Established: 1971; 55 years ago
- Trailheads: Tourist information (begin); "Below the tail" (end)
- Use: Walking
- Waymark: Red line painted on ground
- Website: www.visit-hannover.com/en/Sightseeing-City-Tours/City-tours/The-%22Red-Thread%22-Hannover

Trail map
- The Red Thread (●) is an urban walking trail through the city centre of Hanover, and in particular the site of its old town, shown here within the approximate location of the former 13th-century city wall (●) within the 17th-century inner bastion (●). It begins and ends near the main railway station.

The Red Thread (German: Roter Faden) is a 4.2-kilometre (2.6 mi) urban walking trail in Hanover, Germany, to 36 significant points of interest about architecture and the history of the city centre.

== Description ==
It starts at Ernst August Square next to the tourist information office near 52°22′31″N 9°44′29″E approximately 120 metres (390 ft) south-southeast of the southern, ground level, entrance of the main railway station. Threading through the city centre of Hanover and in particular the site of its old town (Altstadt) in a roughly clockwise direction, the Red Thread ends at the tail end of the equestrian statue of Ernst August. That statue is situated near 52°22′35″N 9°44′27″E about 15 metres (49 ft) in front of that same, southern ground level, entrance of the main railway station.

Barrier-free for the entire course, the line is repainted annually with about 70 litres (18 US gal) of red paint. A brochure that explains each stop along the Red Thread is available in 10 languages, as is a mobile app for iOS called Roter Faden that supports 4 languages.

== Origin ==
The Red Thread is based on the Freedom Trail in Boston, Massachusetts, and was created in 1971 for a marketing campaign developed for the city of Hanover by an agency chosen in 1969 by city manager Martin Neuffer. At that time Hanover had a reputation of being one of the most boring cities in Germany. Appreciating art, city manager Neuffer initiated an image campaign comprising a street art program and a marketing campaign.

== Stops along the Red Thread ==
The walking trail comprises the following 36 numbered stops.

1. The Red Thread starts near the tourist information office at the southeast corner of Ernst August Square south-southeast of the main railway station's southern entry.
2. Galerie Luise is a shopping mall of about 35 shops, which opened in 1987.
3. Hanover Opera House, originally opened in 1852, was destroyed in 1943 by the aerial bombings of Hanover during World War II and reconstructed after the war, finally reopening in 1950.
4. George Street stretches from Stone Gate Square through the main shopping district past the Opera House to Aegidien Gate Square. The street is named after George III, a monarch of the House of Hanover who was Duke and Prince-elector of Hanover in the Holy Roman Empire and then King of Hanover from 12 October 1814, as well as King of Great Britain and Ireland from 1760 to 1820.
5. George Square, also named after George III, is a square dissected diagonally by George Street.
6. The Aegidien Gate was the southeastern city gate until 1748 when the area was redeveloped and today is the Aegidien Gate Square with the Aegidien Gate Square subway station below it.
7. Aegidien Church was destroyed by the aerial bombings during World War II. Its remnants are left standing as a memorial to the victims of war and violence in the city.
8. The Spartan Stone in the southeast exterior of Aegidien Church is a copy of the original now housed in Hanover Historical Museum. Legend has it being the headstone of the "Spartans of Hanover", seven Hanoverians who died defending the city in 1480.
9. Kubus Gallery exhibits contemporary art, focusing on Hanover and the city's twins. Immediately to the gallery's south, a city wall remnant and the Borgentrick tower dating to 1310 are integrated into a former school building.
10. The archer on Tramm Square, a copy by Ernst Moritz Geyger of an earlier piece by him, aims at the mayor's office in the New Town Hall.
11. New Town Hall opened in June 1913, and in November 1946 the new federal state of Lower Saxony was proclaimed in its main hall. Four models of Hanover are exhibited in that hall, showing Hanover as it was around 1689, just before World War II, just after the war, and as it is today. An observation platform at the top of the 97.73-metre (320.6 ft) building, reached by a unique elevator that ascends 43 metres (141 ft) along an arch of up to 17°, offers panoramic views of Hanover that extend to the Harz in favourable visibility.
12. Museum August Kestner was founded in 1889 and exhibits art of ancient and Egyptian cultures, design, coins and medals.
13. The portal at the entrance to the building department (Baudezernat) dates to 1736. It was moved there in 1955 after the barracks whose stable it adorned was destroyed by the aerial bombings during World War II.
14. Laves House, former home of architect Georg Ludwig Friedrich Laves, became a public building in 1908. In 1996 the Lower Saxon Chamber of Architects purchased the building as their headquarters that they now share with the Laves Foundation.
15. Laves built Wangenheim Palace for his eventual neighbour Georg von Wangenheim in 1829–1832. After George V became king of Hanover in 1851, he lived in Wangenheim Palace for 10 years. The building served as town hall from 1862, when officials moved from the Old Town Hall, until 1913, when they moved into the New Town Hall.
16. Waterloo Column commemorates the victory over Napoleon at the Battle of Waterloo by (1) the British-led coalition comprising in part troops from Hanover and the King's German Legion, and (2) the Prussian army.
17. The Flusswasserkunst was a pumping station from 1895 to 1964 that delivered raw water from the Leine river for watering green spaces and flushing sewers. Replacing both an earlier pumping station (the Bornkunst) and the Click Mill that dated to the 13th century, it was replaced itself by a pumping station further upstream. Today the area accommodates a monument that honours the Göttingen Seven and – more broadly – moral courage.
18. While the Palace Bridge, built in 1686, crosses the Leine, it cannot be used for that anymore because the entry to the Leine Palace immediately on the other side is closed permanently. The bridge itself is open to the public.
19. In 1541, the eastern bank of the Leine adjoining the old town began to be raised by about 3 metres (9.8 ft) with remnants of Lauenrode Castle that was slighted in 1371 and the hill on which it stood. The Beguine Tower at that bank is named after the Beguines that inhabited Beguine House in whose garden it was built (which led to it being recorded in 1357 for the first time when they complained about the noise during its construction), and was part of the fortifications of Hanover. Now a popular promenade, the raised bank has only been known as High Bank since 1912, and so cannot have contributed to the most plausible meaning of "Hanover" being "at the high edge or shore". The western bank is, in part, the eastern shore of the former river island Little Venice.
20. On Saturdays the Old Town Flea Market takes place along the promenade on both sides of the Leine among the Nanas by Niki de Saint Phalle (christened Charlotte after Charlotte Buff, Sophie after Sophia of Hanover, and Caroline after Caroline Herschel) that are a part of the Sculpture Mile.
21. Ascending the High Bank east of the Nanas, past the Beguine Tower, the old town is east of the Mews Gate, which features the national coat of arms of George I, the first British monarch of the House of Hanover. Today it stands where the Brühl Gate, thought to have been removed when the armory was constructed between 1643 and 1649, once stood. Built in 1714 as the entry to the riding hall at the new mews that were a part of the stables of the nearby Leine Palace, the riding hall was destroyed by the aerial bombings during World War II and the gate moved 100 metres (330 ft) south to its current location in 1967.
22. The aerial bombings of Hanover during World War II destroyed all but 40 of the historic old town's half-timbered buildings. Hanover's oldest surviving residential building is situated at Burgstraße 12; the front part dates to 1566, and the back and side parts to 1564. A cluster of 12 houses along Burgstraße, Kramerstraße and Knochenhauerstraße also survived the bombings, so parts of old buildings, mostly façades, were moved to that area during reconstruction after the war, resulting in the "new old town" of today.
23. The Church of the Holy Cross, built in 1333 (693 years ago), is Hanover's oldest church. It became a Lutheran church after the citizens of Hanover accepted the Reformation in 1533.
24. In 1655, Johann Duve, a Hanoverian entrepreneur known for his generosity, was permitted to add the Duve Chapel with family tomb to the southern side of the Church of the Holy Cross in return for a donation. Duve is immured there along with his family.
25. While the Ballyard was built in 1649–64 as a sports and assembly hall, the Ballyard Square was created much later, in the 1930s. In 1667 the Ballyard started to be used as a venue for performances; today it is used by Hanover Drama, part of Hanover State Theatre.
26. The Hanover Historical Museum concerns itself with the history of the city, the history of the House of Welf, and of the state of Lower Saxony. Opened in 1903, destroyed during the aerial bombings of World War II and rebuilt after the war, the museum incorporates both the Beguine Tower and remnants of the city wall. It is currently closed for renovations until sometime between 2028 and 2030.
27. Originally a priory dating to about 1300 that was abandoned from 1533 during the Reformation, a small palace began to be constructed on the site in 1636. Modernised and extended in the 17th and 18th centuries, the palace was fully re-built as the Leine Palace between 1816 and 1844 – including the addition of a column portico. Residence to the king from 1837 to 1866, all but the portico was destroyed during the aerial bombings of World War II. Rebuilt between 1956 and 1962, it has been the seat of the Landtag of Lower Saxony since 1962.
28. Leibniz House was originally constructed in 1499 at Schmiedestraße 10, about 250 metres (820 ft) northeast of its current location near Hanover Historical Museum. Becoming known as Leibniz House in the 19th century because Gottfried Wilhelm Leibniz lived in a part of the building between 1698 and his death in 1716, it was destroyed during the aerial bombings of World War II and only reconstructed between 1981 and 1983. Its location was changed because the Schmiedestraße Carpark erected after the war at the original location of Leibniz House also became protected in the meantime.
29. Kramer Street (Kramerstraße) is a pedestrian zone lined with shops and pubs in the heart of the old town. Most of the half-timbered façades were moved there during reconstruction after World War II. From a point called Four Church View, marked within the pavement on the ground at the eastern end of the street, the towers of all four main Lutheran churches in Hanover may be sighted.
30. The Market Church is the main Lutheran church in Hanover. Built in the 14th century, it was restored in 1952 after being damaged during the aerial bombings of World War II. The largest of its 11 bells is also the largest in Lower Saxony, and is used on special occasions only. Hans Michael Elias von Obentraut, who died in 1625 about 9.5 kilometres (5.9 mi) west at Seelze during the Thirty Years' War in a battle against Johann Tserclaes, Count of Tilly, is buried within the church.
31. The Old Town Hall, built from 1410, was Hanover's first town hall. In 1862, officials moved to Wangenheim Palace before moving to the New Town Hall in 1913. Damaged heavily during the aerial bombings of World War II, it was restored extensively in 1953 and 1964. However, throughout its 616-year history the building has changed more than once, from the surrounding ground being raised causing the original ground floor to become the cellar it is today, demolition of the Pharmacist wing in 1844 to make way for what is today Karmarsch Street, to renovations in 1999, to highlight just some changes.
32. Mascarons such as the one in the façade of the Old Town Hall that faces Köbelinger Street (Köbelingerstraße) used to be attached to buildings in Europe to ward off evil. However, local legend has it being about a boy whose face was turned to stone as punishment.
33. The Market Hall is smaller than the one that stood in its place before World War II. Destroyed during the aerial bombings, the new hall opened in 1954. Stalls found within sell produce such as fruit, vegetables, bread and fish, as well as hot meals.
34. George and Station streets have one of the highest shop densities in Germany, and are part of a pedestrian zone that extends into the surrounding area as far west as Stone Gate Square and from Market Church in the south to the main railway station in the north. The pedestrian zone has two levels along Station Street and the Niki de Saint Phalle Promenade below it. The promenade continues below the railway station to connect with the approximately 1,600-metre-long (0.99 mi) Lister Mile at its north, and which along its northern third is part of another pedestrian zone.
35. Kröpcke is the central square of Hanover today, located at the intersection of George and Station streets. The Kröpcke clock at the eastern end of the square is a popular meeting spot for locals, similar to the spot below the tail of the Ernst August equestrian statue back at the main railway station. Kröpcke underground station, the largest in the city's light rail network, is below the square. All three of Hanover's subway tunnels in use meet at this multi-level station.
36. The Red Thread terminates below the tail (unterm Schwanz) of the Ernst August equestrian statue back at the main railway station.

== General references ==
- Lange, Klaus (2011). Welche Nana steht auf dem Kopf (in German). Hannover: Agitares. OCLC 936043105.
- Klaus Mlynek; Waldemar R. Röhrbein, eds. (2009), Hannover City Lexicon. From the beginnings into the present (in German), Hanover: Schlütersche Verlagsgesellschaft, OCLC 458691668, OL 45212542M, Wikidata Q2327579
