= Waterloo Column =

Victory monument in Hanover, Germany

- Waterloosäule
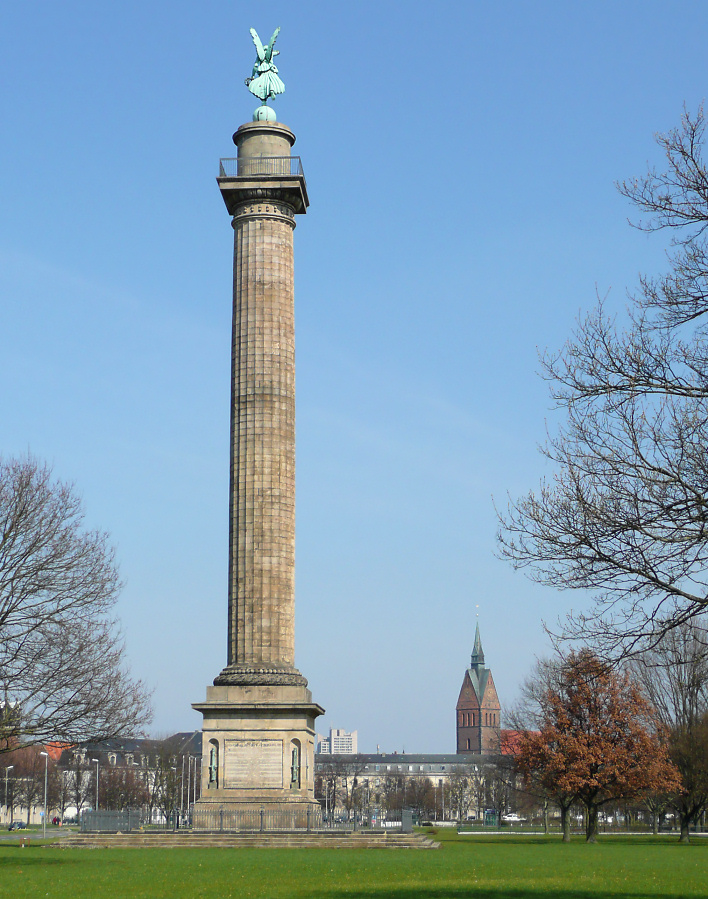
- Waterloo Column from south-east, with Leine Palace in distance and Market Church further behind the palace
- Waterloo Column is just outside the former 17th-century inner bastion (●), facing the Leine Palace situated within the former 13th-century city wall (●)
- Location: Hanover
- Coordinates: 52.3665°N 9.72761°E
- Designer: Georg Ludwig Friedrich Laves
- Material: Deister Sandstone
- Width: 3.75 m (12.3 ft)
- Height: 46.31 m (151.9 ft)
- Beginning date: 1825; 200 years ago
- Completion date: 1832; 193 years ago
- Dedicated to: Victors of Waterloo

The Waterloo Column (German: Waterloosäule) is a victory column commemorating the Battle of Waterloo. It is situated in Hanover, the capital of the German state of Lower Saxony. Built from 1825 to 1832, it was designed by Georg Ludwig Friedrich Laves who had been the Hanover court architect since 1814. While a statue of the goddess Victoria is placed atop the column, the sentiment is balanced by the tribute to fallen Hanoverian soldiers named on the column's base. The troops honoured fought in an army loyal to King George III, who ruled the United Kingdom of Great Britain and Ireland while also ruler of the Kingdom of Hanover in a personal union.

== Description ==
The column reaches a height of 46.31 metres (151.9 ft), while the diameter of the column is 3.75 metres (12 ft 4 in). Its base displays the names of fallen soldiers from regiments named for towns in the Kingdom of Hanover, as well as the dedication Den Siegern von Waterloo, das dankbare Vaterland (transl. To the victors of Waterloo, [from] the thankful fatherland). The base of the column displays the names of 876 fallen soldiers.

The final concept for the project was a celebration of the victory of the state and its monarch. The statue of the goddess of victory at the top of the column was designed by August Hengst. Made out of copper and iron, and about 4.55 metres (14.9 ft) tall, it originated in the metalworker Conrad Beckmann's workshop.

The column's base incorporates eight barrels of field cannons captured in the battle, which are displayed vertically in the column's base. A spiral staircase with 189 steps in the column's interior leads to an observation platform on the top. It is possible to visit this observation platform, but only on certain days.

Waterloo Column is a stop on the Red Thread (Roter Faden), a 4.2-kilometre-long (2.6 mi) urban walking trail through the city centre of Hanover. Waterloo subway station is about 200 metres (660 ft) north-east of the column below Waterloo Plaza, the park that surrounds the column.

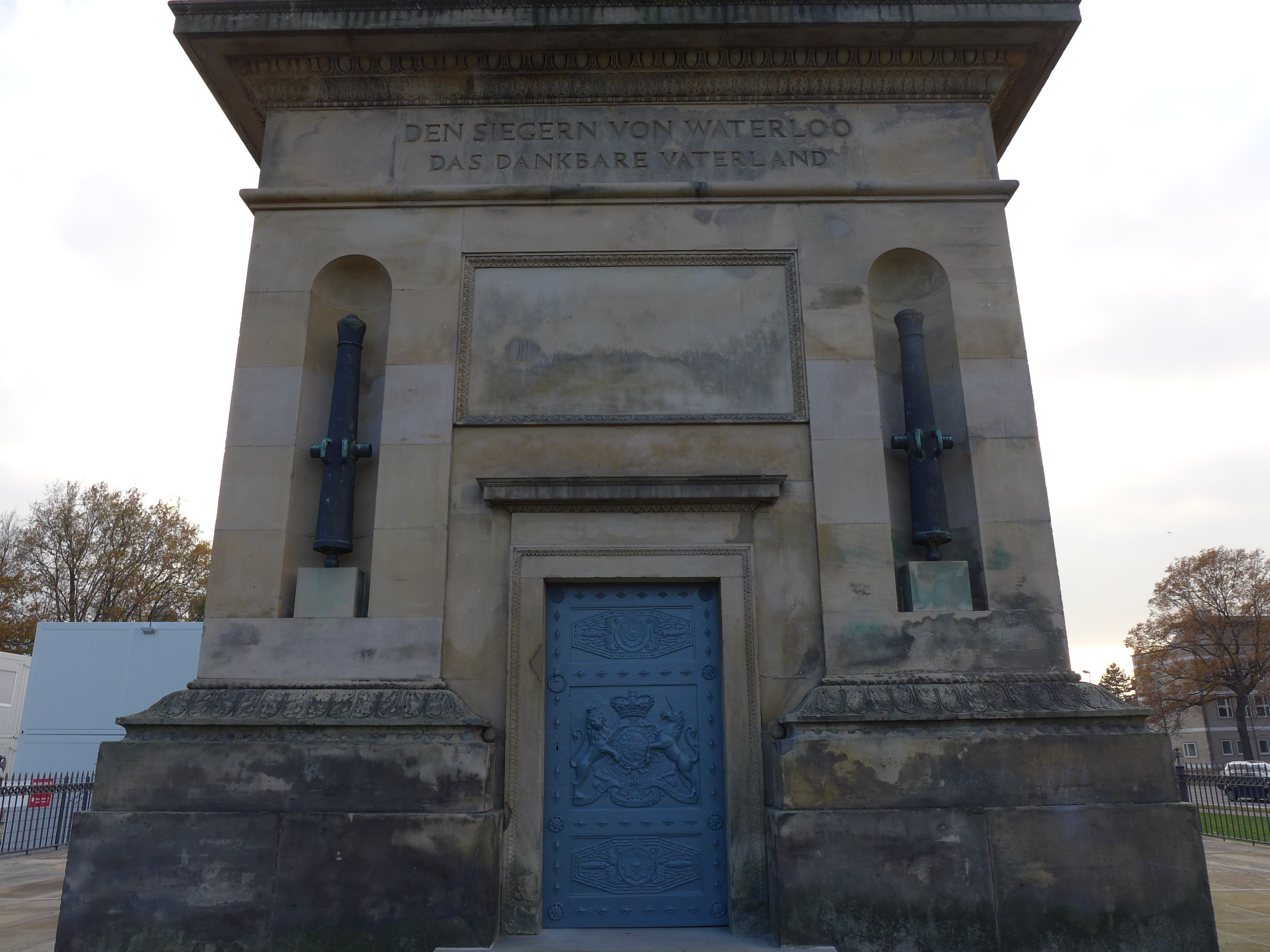
View of the column's base

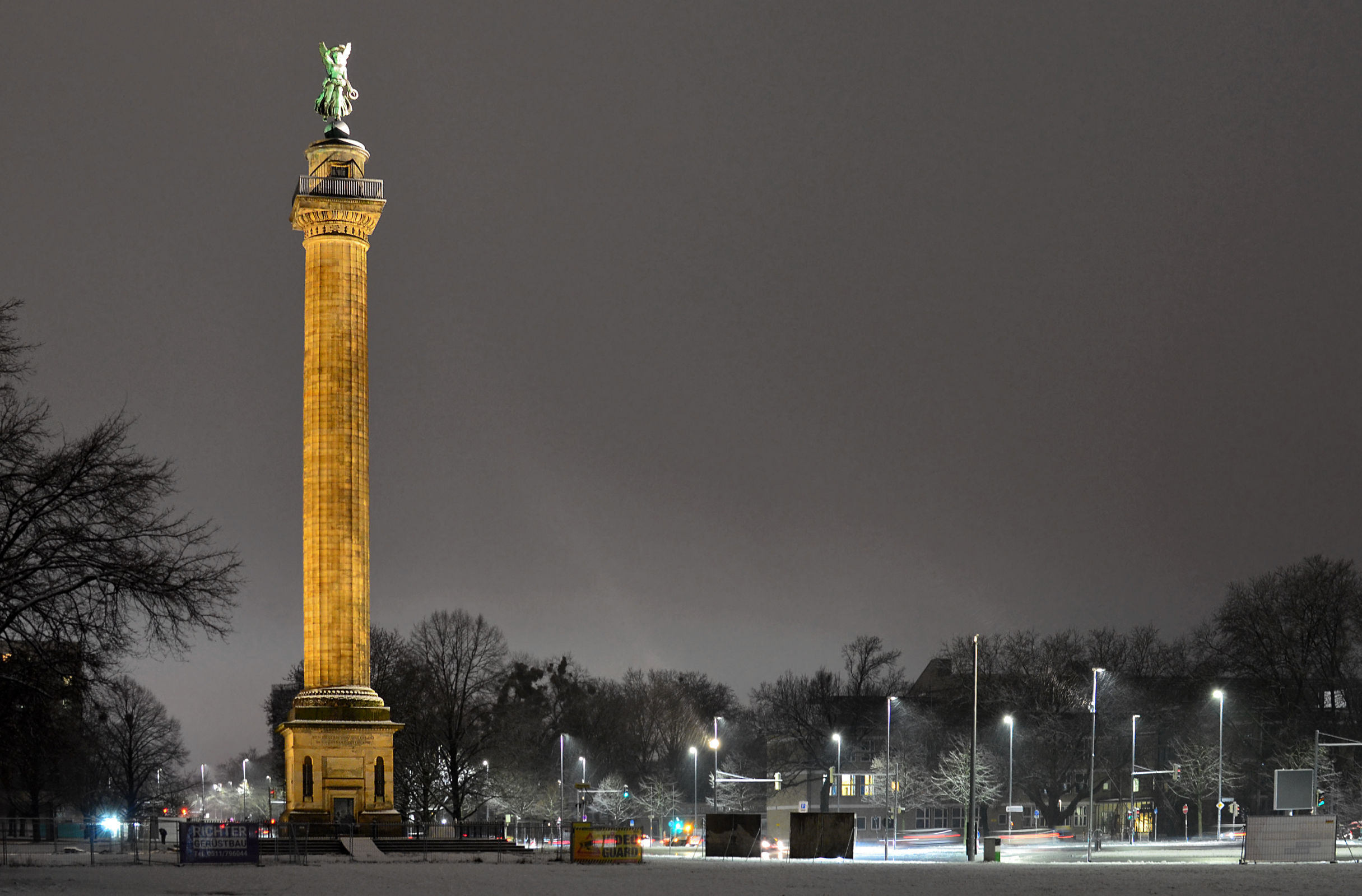
Illuminated in snow at night in January 2025

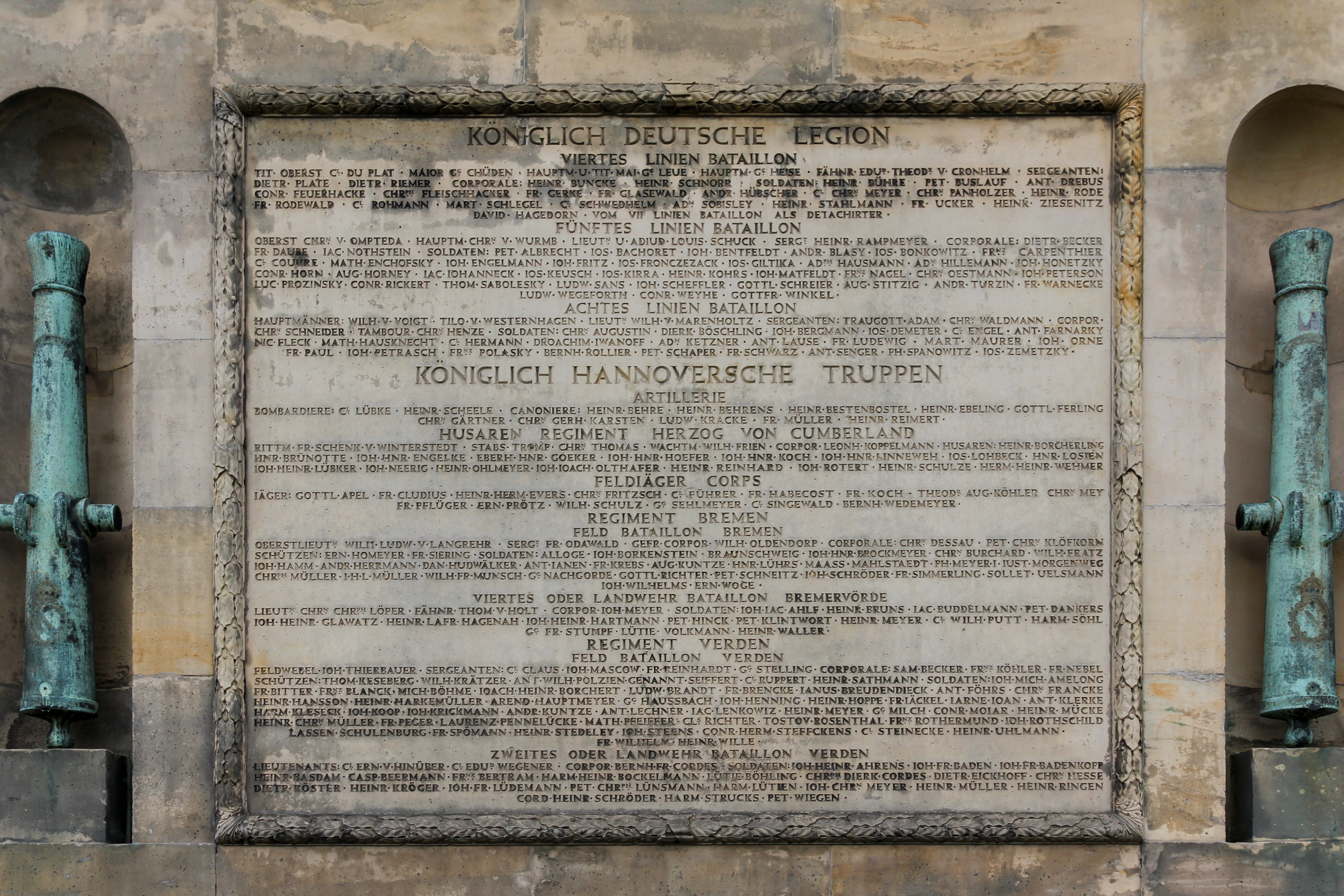
Names of the 876 Hanoverian soldiers that fell at Waterloo

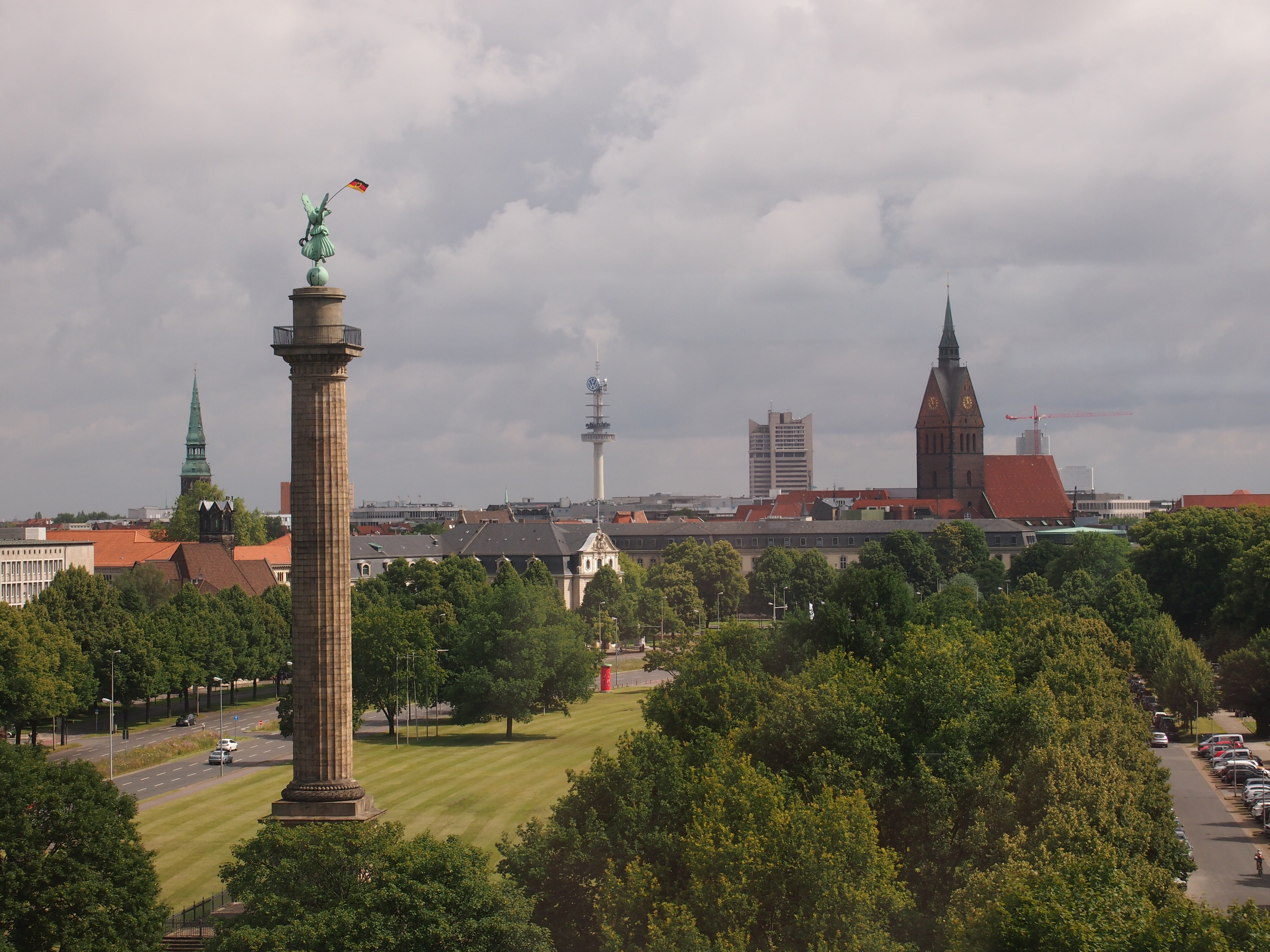
Victoria holding German flag in 2014, the year Germany won the World Cup for the fourth time

== Historical background ==
The list of fallen soldiers includes members of the King's German Legion. Many men from Hanover had joined up with the King's German Legion. (Note: Hanover was in a personal union with Britain for 123 years before it was a part of Prussia for 78 years.) King George III, who was also the Elector of Hanover, created this legion due to Napoleon's invasion and occupation of Hanover in 1803. New recruits continued to arrive in Britain in order to reject French occupation. The occupiers had made Hanover part of the puppet state of the Kingdom of Westphalia. While not all the soldiers in the legion were from Hanover, the legion was meant to be specifically for German troops.

After the defeat of Napoleon at the Battle of Leipzig in 1813, Hanover, with somewhat expanded boundaries, was reconstituted as an electorate (even though the Holy Roman Empire, which the electorate was a part of, had been dissolved). However, by the time of the Battle of Waterloo, it had become the Kingdom of Hanover. George III was the king of Hanover and of Britain, but the kingdoms were still separate as it was a personal union. (Note: For an analysis of the union and how it was viewed by contemporaries in each kingdom toward the end of the union, see Harding (2007).) This is why differing succession laws were able, in 1837, to cause Queen Victoria to become Queen of the United Kingdom of Great Britain and Ireland while Ernest Augustus became the king of Hanover.

Taking place on 18 June 1815, the Battle of Waterloo was between Napoleon's France on the one side and Hanover, the Duchy of Brunswick, Prussia, the United Kingdom, the Netherlands and the Duchy of Nassau on the other. The troops in this battle included those in the King's German Legion. (Note: In fact, Simms (2015) recounts the effect that one particular battalion of The King's German Legion had on the battle. According to this work, the 400 soldiers of the 2nd Light Battalion had an outsized role in the battle, holding a farm at the centre of the battle line until reinforcements arrived to help them continue.) In Hanover, there was civic support for a memorial honouring the dead from Hanover by 1816. Funding issues resulted in the project stalling, before it was eventually picked up by the state. In the interim, in 1818 the Hanoverian Monument was constructed near the Lion's Mound in Belgium on the battlefield of Waterloo to commemorate the soldiers of the King's German Legion.

== Symbolism and reception ==
During World War II, the tower remained standing despite extensive destruction of the surrounding area by the aerial bombings of Hanover. A modern web exhibition by the Cambridge University Library recounts that "the column survived intact, bearing witness to an earlier era in which a coalition of powers was united against expansionist militarism", presenting Allied unity against Germany during World War II as similar to the coalition action against Napoleon at Waterloo.

In 1965, Queen Elizabeth II had intended to lay a wreath at the column. However, West Germany was less comfortable with military heroism after World War II than the queen, and the West German government was also careful not to offend the French, who were now their allies, so the wreath-laying was called off.

In 2014, the statue of Victoria at the top of the column was given a German flag, likely in honour of Germany’s team in the 2014 World Cup in Brazil – and who would go on to win the cup for the fourth time. While this display of patriotism may not have been officially initiated, the Waterloo Square, where the column is located, has hosted many large viewing parties for significant sporting events. It was the site of public viewing during the 2006 FIFA World Cup in Germany. The square hosted viewing parties for the UEFA European Championship in 2024.

The city has recently taken steps that suggest that the column is recognized by the city as an important cultural landmark. The column has recently required funding for renovations necessitated by unintentionally harmful conservation work on the column in 1985. In 2019, the city of Hanover approved payment for €825,000 worth of these renovations, while the German government is providing about €450,000. Since Christmas 2024, the column has been illuminated at night.
