= Hanoverian Monument =

Memorial of the Battle of Waterloo

- Monument aux Hanovriens
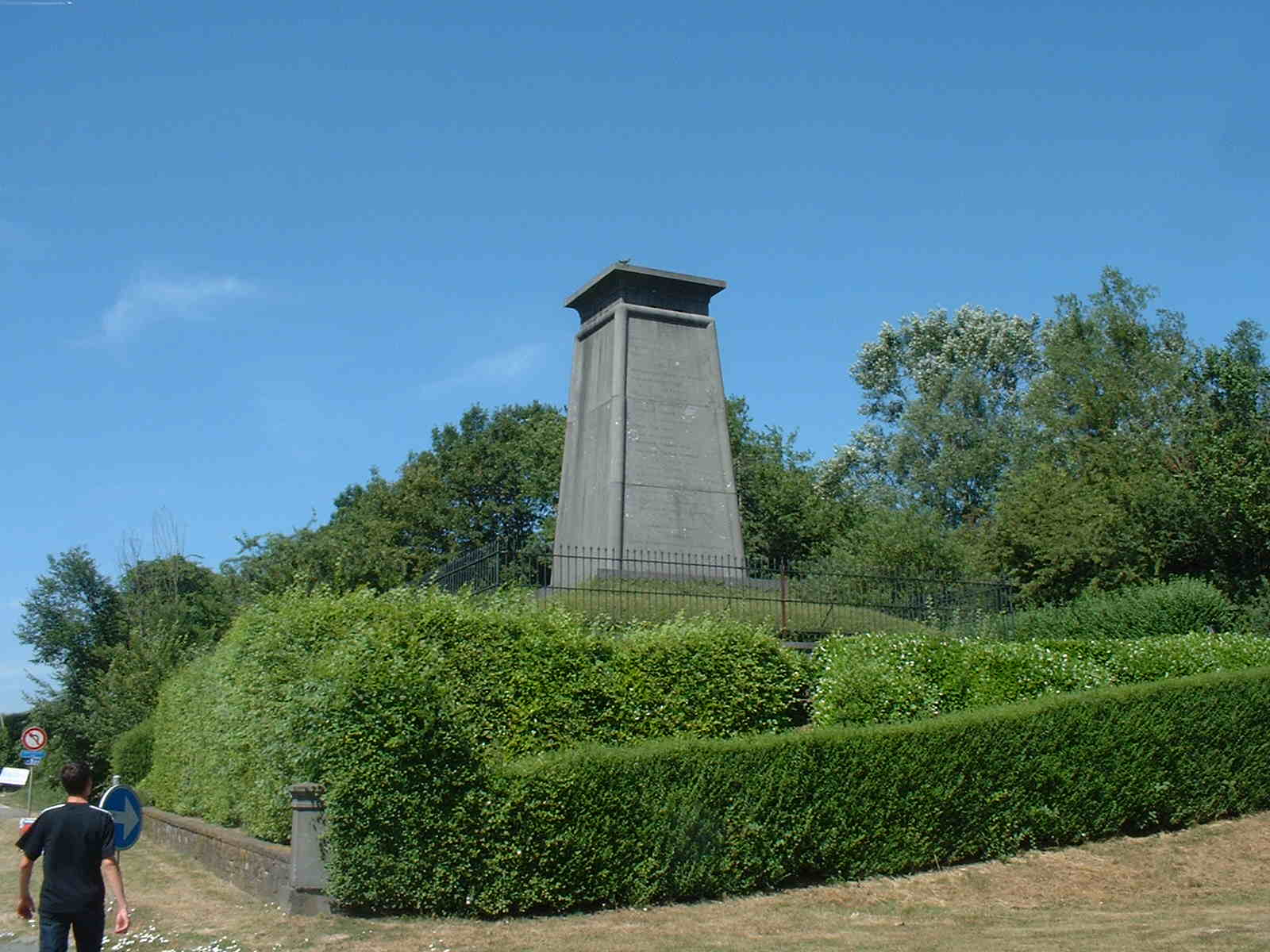
- Hanoverian Monument in Waterloo
- Interactive map of Hanoverian Monument
- Location: Braine-l'Alleud, Walloon Brabant, Belgium
- Coordinates: 50.679447°N 4.41249°E
- Type: Memorial
- Completion date: 1818; 208 years ago
- Dedicated to: King's German Legion

The Hanoverian Monument, also known as the Monument to the Hanoverians from its French name, Monument aux Hanovriens, is an 1818 monument constructed on the battlefield of Waterloo in Belgium. It is located not far from the Lion's Mound. The memorial commemorates soldiers of the King's German Legion (KGL), primarily drawn from the Kingdom of Hanover, who were killed during the 1815 battle. Amongst those killed during the fighting was Christian Friedrich Wilhelm von Ompteda.

The Legion had been formed following the French Invasion of Hanover in 1803. The KGL participated in numerous British military campaigns, notably during the Peninsular War. At Waterloo men from the KGL notably defended the strategic farmhouse at La Haye Sainte. Distinctly separate units of the revived Hanoverian Army also took part in the Waterloo campaign. The monument was made out of limestone.

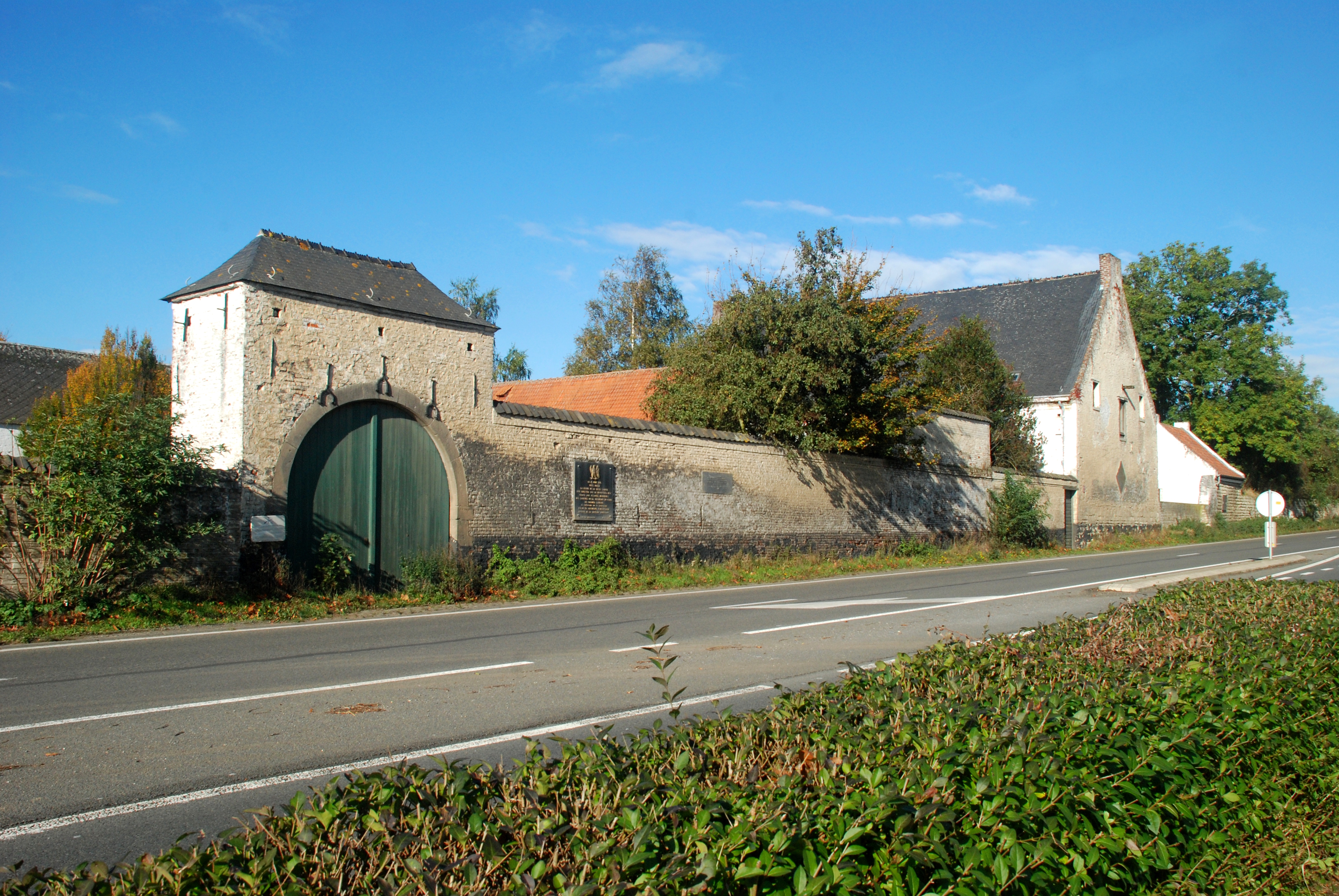
The farmhouse of La Haye Sainte where many KGL troops lost their lives.

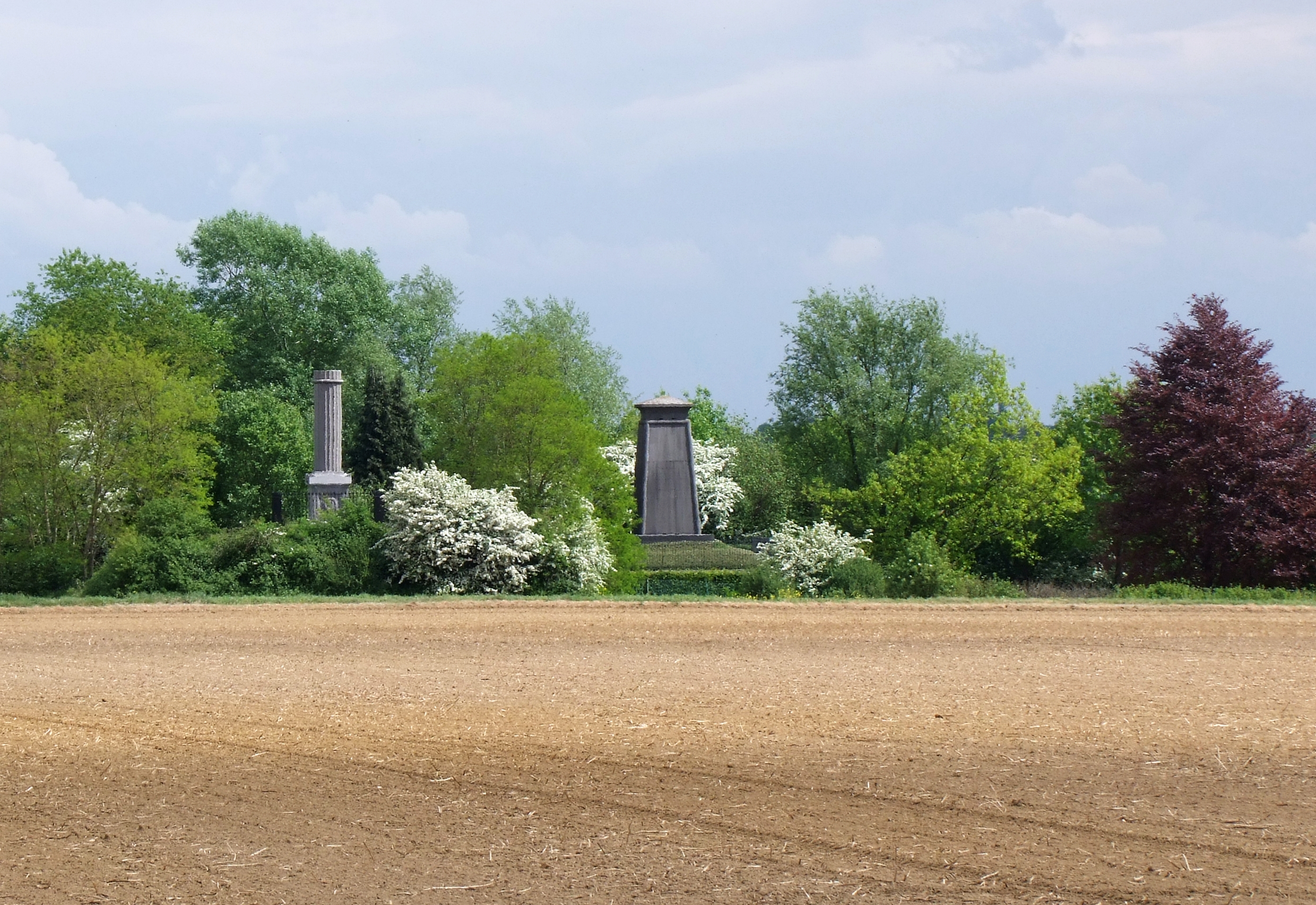
Hanoverian Monument from the west, Gordon Monument at its left

== See also ==
- Gordon Monument, a nearby monument commemorating the British officer Alexander Gordon
- Waterloo Column, a memorial in Hanover

== Sources ==
- Howarth, David Armine (1980). Waterloo. London: Pitkin. ISBN 0-8537-2294-3. OCLC 7156157. OL 8285352M.
- Uffindell, Andrew; Corum, Michael (2002). On The Fields Of Glory: The Battlefields of the 1815 Campaign. Frontline Books.
