= Gordon Monument =

Memorial of the Battle of Waterloo

Coordinates: 50°40′46″N 4°24′43″E

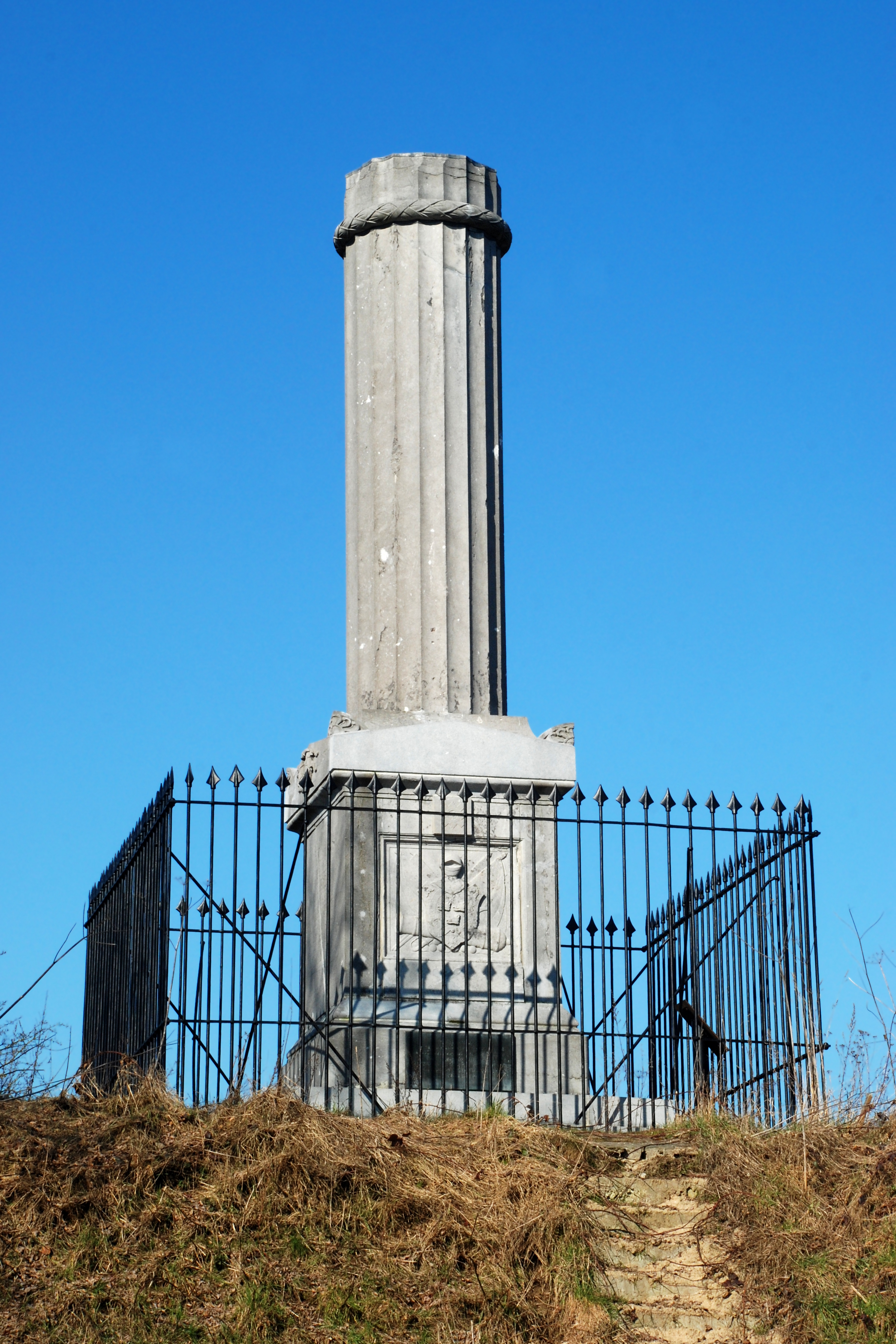
The Gordon Monument close to the N5 road

The Gordon Monument is a neoclassical monument to a slain warrior on the battlefield of Waterloo. The person commemorated is Lt Colonel Sir Alexander Gordon (1786–1815). It was erected in 1817 by the siblings of the deceased who included a future Prime Minister, Lord Aberdeen.

The monument takes the form of a severed column, or colonne brisée to use the French term, reached by a flight of steps. It was designed by the British architect John Buonarotti Papworth, and executed in a type of limestone known as Belgian blue stone (French: pierre bleue).

The pedestal features inscriptions and reliefs, including the badge of the Scots Guards, the regiment in which Gordon served, with its motto Nemo me impune lacessit

== Location ==
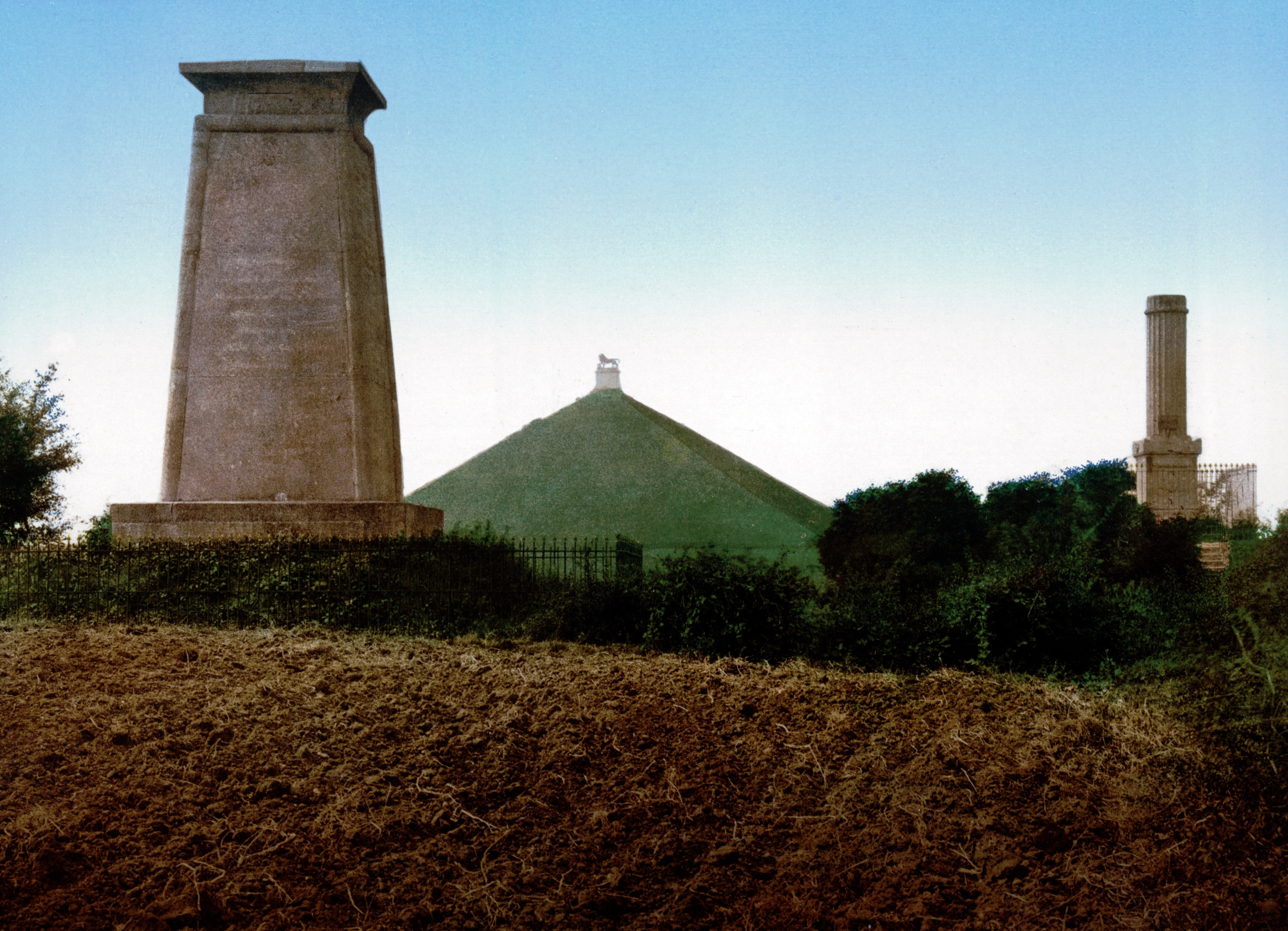
Related monuments: Monument to the Hanoverians (1818) on the left, Lion's Mound (1820s), Gordon Monument

The monument is on the boundary between two Francophone municipalities, Braine-l'Alleud and Lasne. The historic area commemorating the Battle of Waterloo is currently administered by these municipalities and Waterloo.

Other monuments of interest on the Battlefield of Waterloo include one to the King's German Legion (Monument aux Hanovriens) which was erected in 1818 near the Gordon Monument.

== Conservation and heritage status ==
=== Conservation ===
The monument underwent repairs in the 19th century which are recorded on the monument itself. The most recent restoration work in 2012 was part of the refurbishment of the battlefield which was carried out in advance of the 200th anniversary of the battle.

=== Heritage status ===
Belgium gave protection to the battlefield in 1914. The current heritage listing is maintained by the autonomous region of Wallonia. Consideration is being given to international protection by UNESCO.

==== Regional protection ====
Described as an English rather than a British monument (Monument des Anglais à la mémoire de Gordon), the Gordon Monument has been included in the Patrimoine culturel immobilier classé de la Wallonie, a heritage register maintained by Wallonia. The battlefield itself is protected by a heritage listing for sites, being on Wallonia's Liste du patrimoine immobilier exceptionnel.

==== International protection ====
Belgium has included the battlefield on the tentative list for World Heritage status with the French title Le champ de bataille de Waterloo, la fin de l’épopée napoléonienne. The submission to UNESCO mentions the "colonne Gordon" in the description of the site.

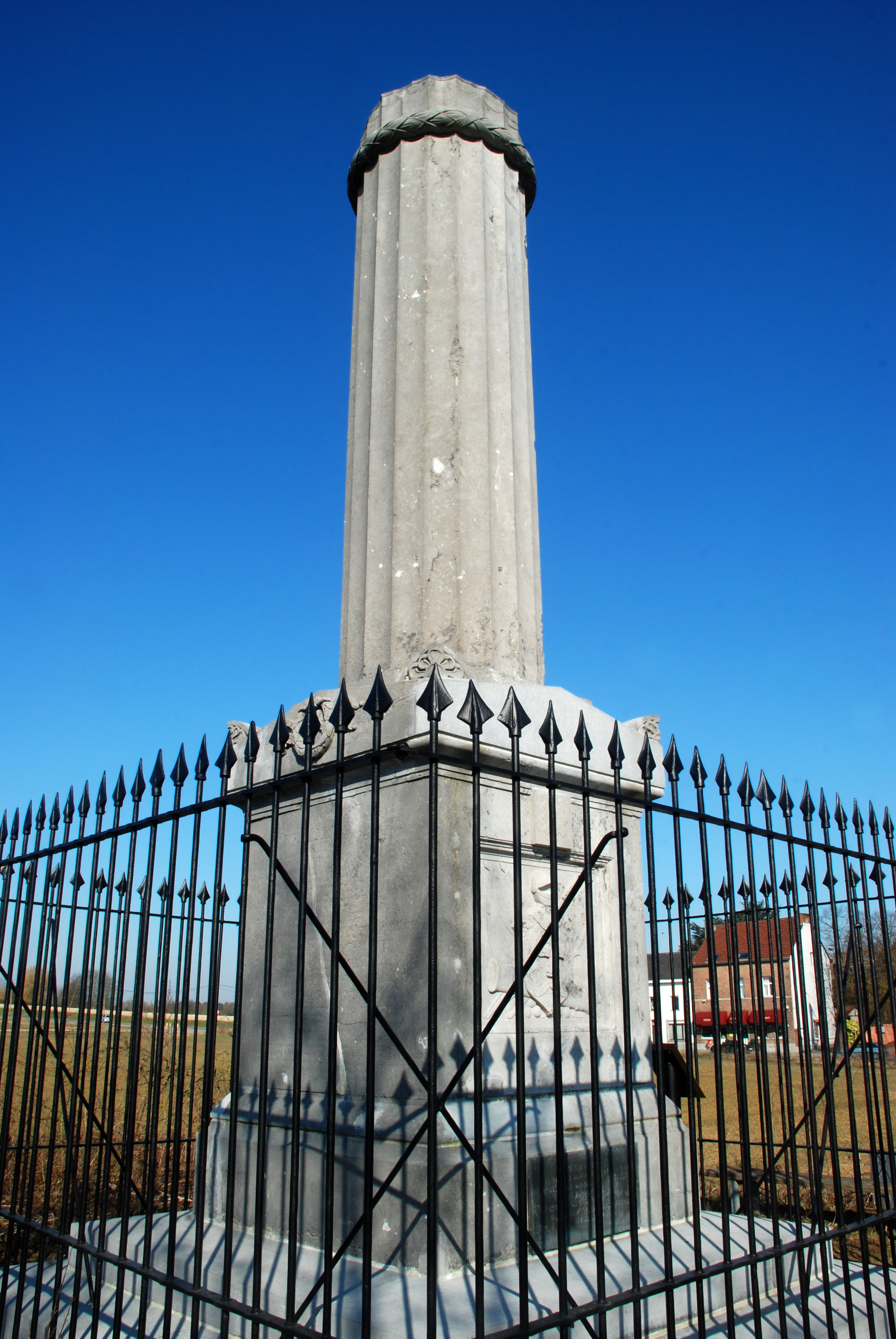
Column.

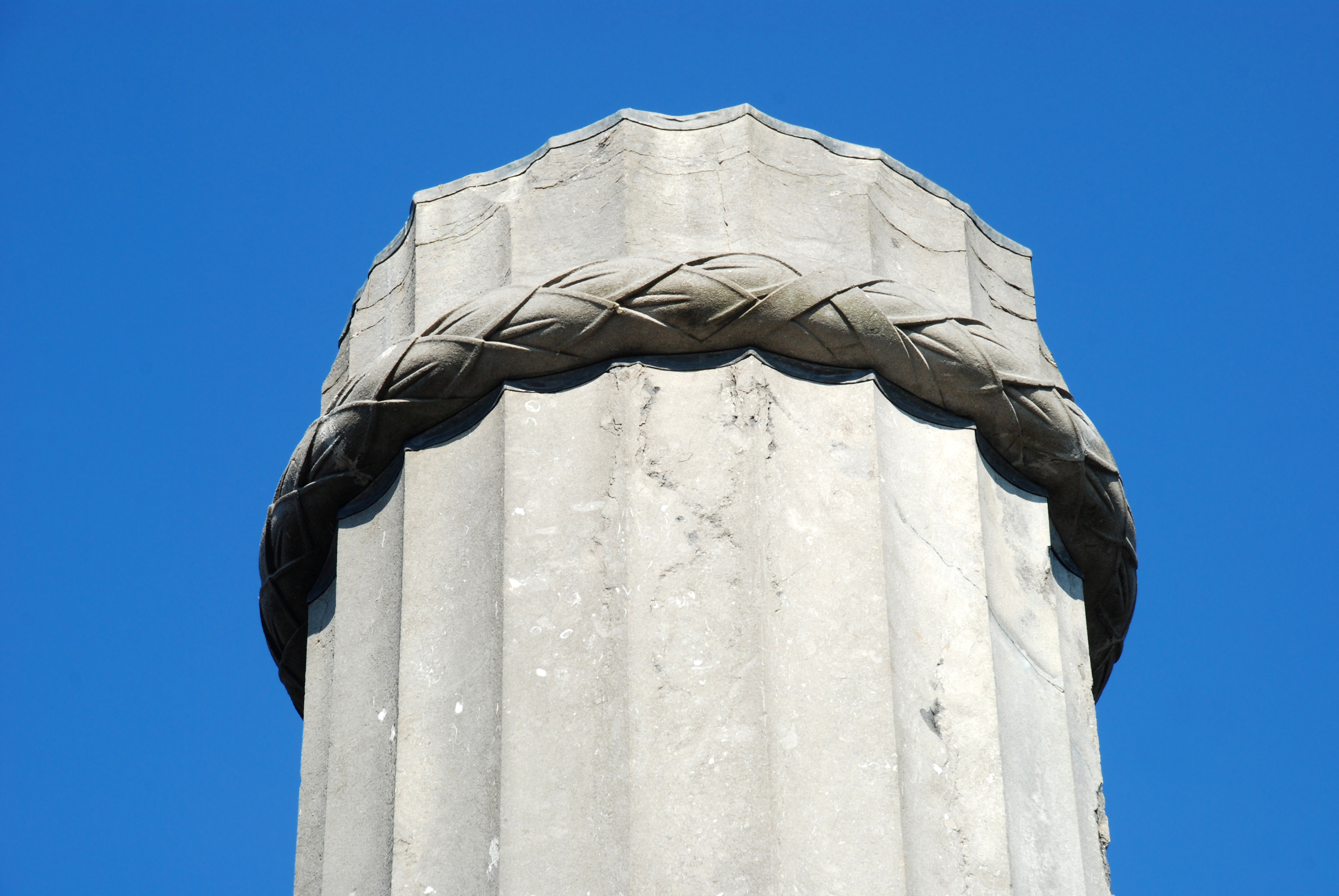
Top of the column.

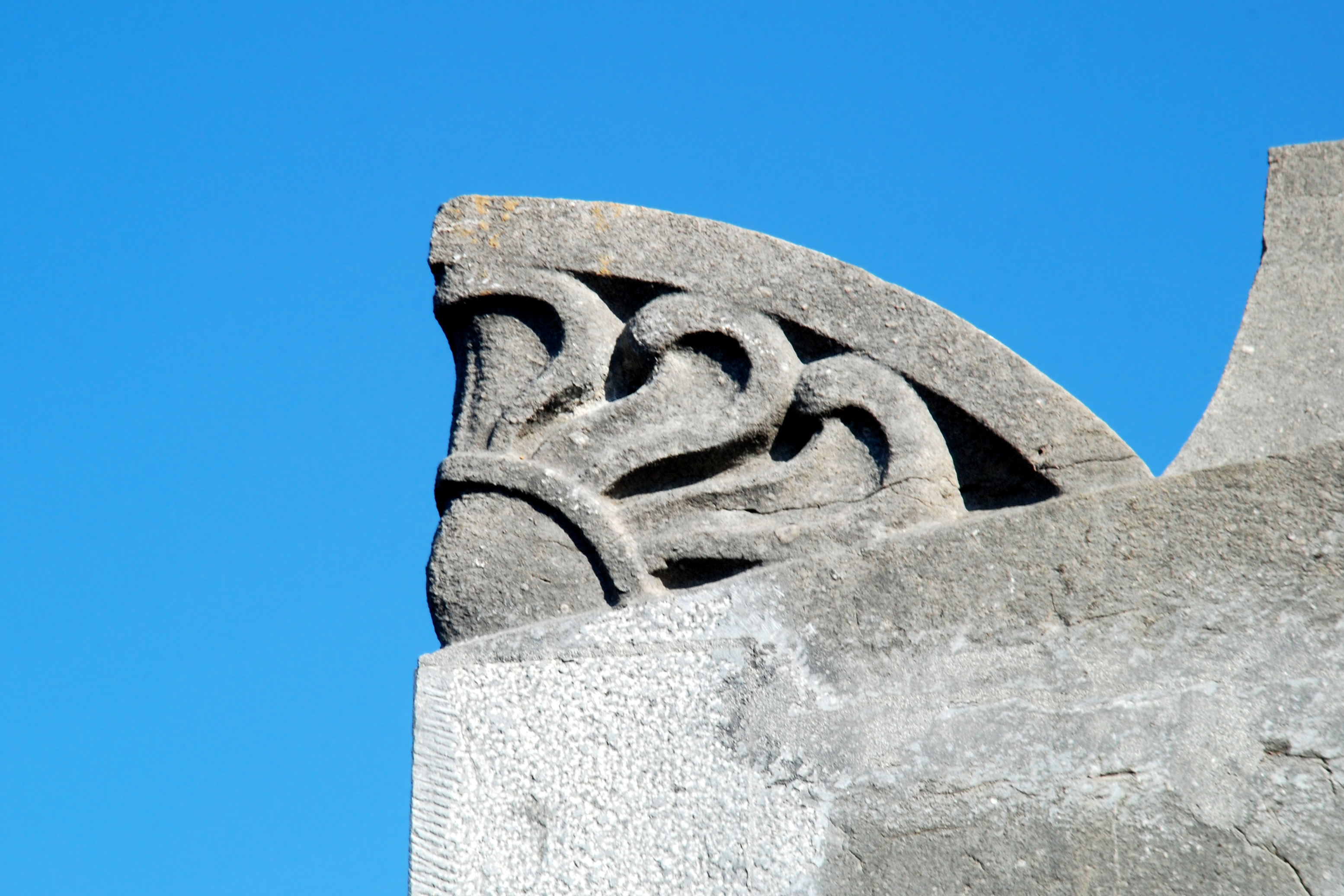
Ornament (acroterion).

== See also ==
There are also monuments of interest commemorating the Battle of Quatre Bras.

- Hanoverian Monument, an 1818 monument near Gordon's memorial commemorating the King's German Legion
