= Johann Wolfgang von Goethe bibliography =

The following is a list of the major publications of Johann Wolfgang von Goethe (1749–1832). 142 volumes comprise the entirety of his literary output, ranging from the poetical to the philosophical, including 50 volumes of correspondence.

== Scientific texts ==
- 1784: Über den Granit (About the Granite) (published posthumously in 1878)
- 1786: Über den Zwischenkiefer der Menschen und der Tiere (About the premaxilla of humans and animals)
- 1790: Versuch die Metamorphose der Pflanzen zu erklären (The Metamorphosis of Plants)
- 1791-92: Beiträge zur Optik (Contributions to Optics) (2 volumes)
- 1810: Zur Farbenlehre (The Theory of Colours)

== Autobiographical ==
- 1811–1830: Aus meinem Leben: Dichtung und Wahrheit (From my Life: Poetry and Truth) autobiographical work in 4 volumes
- 1817: Italienische Reise (Italian Journey), journals
- 1836 and 1848: Gespräche mit Goethe (Conversations with Goethe) also translated as: Conversations with Eckermann - posthumous

== Non-fiction ==
- 1793: Die Belagerung von Mainz (The Siege of Mainz), non-fiction
- July 1798–1801: Propyläen, periodical
- 1805: "Winckelmann und sein Jahrhundert" ("Winckelmann and his Century")

== Prose ==
=== Novels ===
- 1774: Die Leiden des jungen Werthers (The Sorrows of Young Werther)
- 1809: Die Wahlverwandtschaften (Elective Affinities)

==== Wilhelm Meister Trilogy ====
1. 1776: Wilhelm Meisters theatralische Sendung (Ur-Meister) (Wilhelm Meister's Theatrical Mission) - published in 1911
2. 1796: Wilhelm Meisters Lehrjahre (Wilhelm Meister's Apprenticeship)
3. 1821, expanded in 1829: Wilhelm Meisters Wanderjahre, oder Die Entsagenden (Wilhelm Meister's Journeyman Years, or the Renunciants/Wilhelm Meister's Travels)

=== Short Fiction ===
- 1794–95: Unterhaltungen deutscher Ausgewanderten (Conversations of German emigrants) - also includes the fairy tale Das Märchen - collection
- 1828: Novella

=== Short Story ===
- 1795: "Das Märchen" ("The Green Snake and the Beautiful Lily") - a fairy tale

== Poetry ==
- 1769 "Ohne Hast, ohne Rast" ("Haste not, Rest not")
- 1771: "Heidenröslein" ("Heath Rosebud"),
- 1773: "Prometheus",
- 1774: "Der König in Thule",
- 1782: "Der Erlkönig" ("The Alder King"),
- 1790: Römische Elegien (Roman Elegies), collection
- 1794: Reineke Fuchs, epic fable
- 1795 "Ich Denke Dein" ("I Think of You")
- 1795–96 (in collaboration with Friedrich Schiller): Die Xenien (The Xenia), collection of epigrams
- 1797: "Der Zauberlehrling" (The Sorcerer's Apprentice), (which was later the basis of a symphonic poem by Paul Dukas, which in turn was animated by Disney in Fantasia)
- 1797: "Die Braut von Korinth" ("The Bride of Corinth"),
- 1798: Hermann und Dorothea (Hermann and Dorothea), epic
- 1798: Die Weissagungen des Bakis (The Soothsayings of Bakis)
- 1799: "The First Walpurgis Night",
- 1813: "Gefunden" ("Found"),
- 1819: Westöstlicher Diwan, variously translated as The West-Eastern Divan, The Parliament of East and West, or otherwise; collection of poems in imitation of Sufi and other Sunni Muslim poetry, including that of Hafez.
- 1823: "Marienbad Elegy",

== Drama ==
- 1773: Götz von Berlichingen
- 1774: Clavigo, tragedy in five acts, written in May 1774, premiered in Hamburg on August 23, 1774.
- 1775: Stella, tragedy in five acts (created between 1803 and 1805 from the first version of 1775, the play was premiered in Weimar on January 15, 1806)
- 1776: Claudine von Villa Bella
- 1787: Iphigenie auf Tauris (Iphigenia in Tauris)
- 1788: Egmont
- 1790: Torquato Tasso
- 1803: Die Natürliche Tochter (The Natural Daughter), play originally intended as the first part of a trilogy on the French Revolution
- 1808: Faust, Part One
- 1832: Faust, Part Two
