= Johann Wolfgang von Goethe =

German writer and polymath (1749–1832)

Geheimrat Johann Wolfgang von Goethe
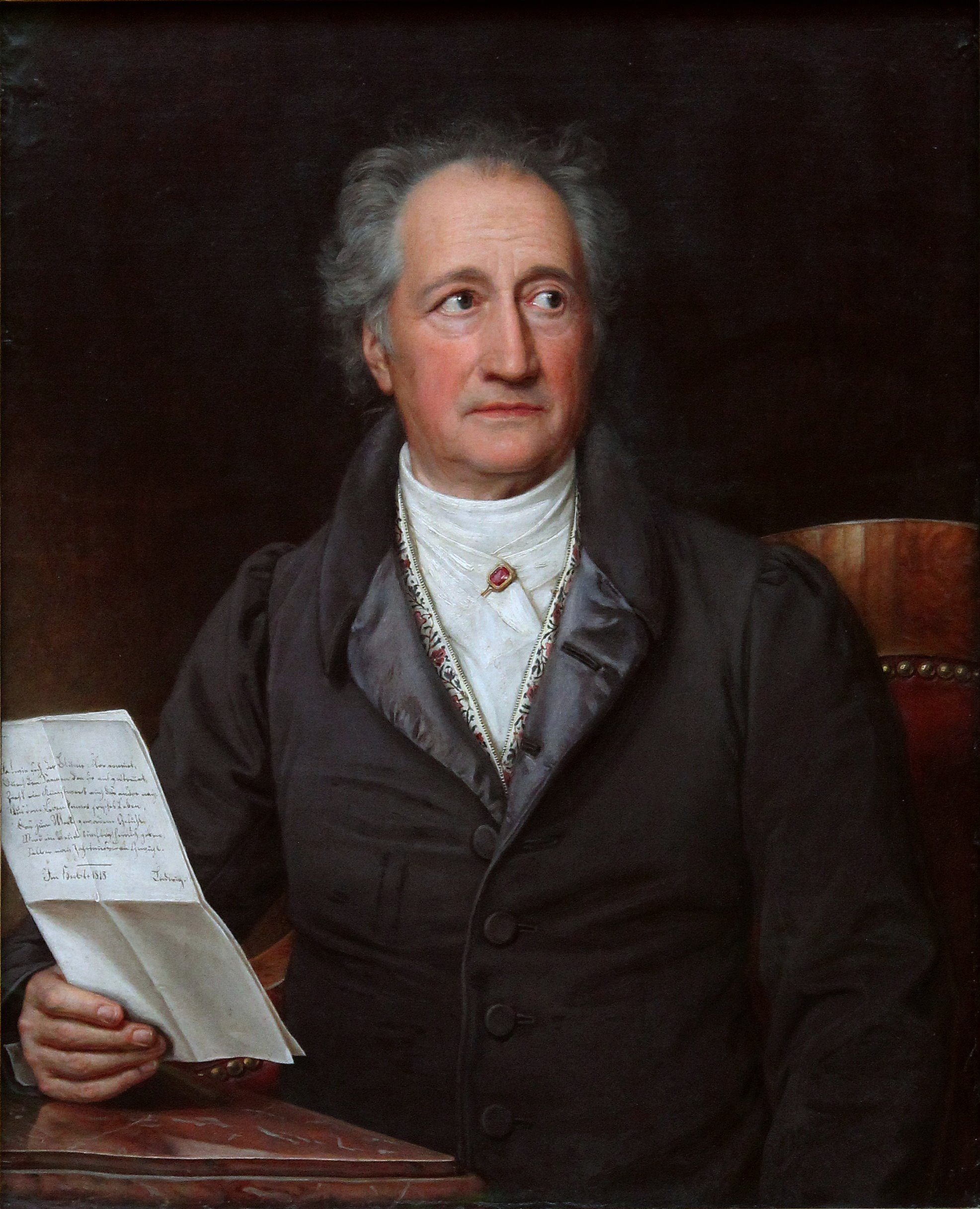
- Portrait by Joseph Karl Stieler, 1828
- Born: Johann Wolfgang Goethe; 28 August 1749; Free City of Frankfurt, Holy Roman Empire
- Died: 22 March 1832 (aged 82); Weimar, Saxe-Weimar-Eisenach
- Education: Leipzig University; University of Strasbourg (Lic., 1771)
- Spouse: Christiane Vulpius (m. 1806; died 1816)
- Children: 5, including August
- Parents: Johann Caspar Goethe; Catharina Elisabeth Textor
- Writing career
- Genres: Fiction (poetry; novel; romance; drama); Non-fiction (treatise; aesthetic criticism; autobiography; oration)
- Notable work: See Johann Wolfgang von Goethe bibliography
- Movements: Sturm und Drang; Weimar Classicism
Other positions
Finance Minister of the Duchy of Saxe-Weimar
In office
1782–1784
Superintendent of the ducal library and Chief Adviser of Saxe-Weimar (from 1775)
Commissioner of the War, Mines and Highways Commissions of Saxe-Weimar (from 1779)

Johann Wolfgang von Goethe (Note: German pronunciation: [ˈjoːhan ˈvɔlfɡaŋ fɔn ˈɡøːtə]; English pronunciations include /ˈɡɜːrtə/ GUR-tə, also US: /ˈɡʌtə, ˈɡeɪtə, -ti/ GUT-ə, GAY-tə, -ee. The nobiliary particle von is omitted when using the surname alone.) (28 August 1749 – 22 March 1832) was a German polymath who is widely regarded as the most influential writer in the German language. His work has had a wide-ranging influence on literary, political, Christian views, and philosophical thought in the Western world from the late 18th century to the present. A poet, playwright, novelist, scientist, statesman, theatre-director, and critic, Goethe wrote a wide range of works, including plays, poetry and aesthetic criticism, as well as treatises on botany, anatomy, and colour.

Goethe took up residence in Weimar in 1775 following the success of his first novel, The Sorrows of Young Werther (1774), and joined a thriving intellectual and cultural environment under the patronage of Duchess Anna Amalia that formed the basis of Weimar Classicism. He was ennobled by Karl August, Duke of Saxe-Weimar, in 1782. Goethe was an early participant in the Sturm und Drang literary movement. During his first ten years in Weimar, Goethe became a member of the Duke's privy council (1776–1785), sat on the war and highway commissions, oversaw the reopening of silver mines in nearby Ilmenau, and implemented a series of administrative reforms at the University of Jena. He also contributed to the planning of Weimar's botanical park and the rebuilding of its Ducal Palace. (Note: In 1998, both of these sites, together with nine others, were designated a UNESCO World Heritage Site under the name Classical Weimar.)

Goethe's first major scientific work, the Metamorphosis of Plants, was published after he returned from a 1788 tour of Italy. In 1791 he was made managing director of the theatre at Weimar, and in 1794 he began a friendship with the dramatist, historian, and philosopher Friedrich Schiller, whose plays he premiered until Schiller's death in 1805. During this period, Goethe published his second novel, Wilhelm Meister's Apprenticeship; the verse epic Hermann and Dorothea, and, in 1808, the first part of his most celebrated drama, Faust. His conversations and various shared undertakings throughout the 1790s with Schiller, Johann Gottlieb Fichte, Johann Gottfried Herder, Alexander von Humboldt, Wilhelm von Humboldt, and August and Friedrich Schlegel have come to be collectively termed Weimar Classicism.

The German philosopher Arthur Schopenhauer named Wilhelm Meister's Apprenticeship one of the four greatest novels ever written, (Note: The others Schopenhauer named were Tristram Shandy, La Nouvelle Héloïse, and Don Quixote) while the American philosopher and essayist Ralph Waldo Emerson selected Goethe as one of six "representative men" in his work of the same name (along with Plato, Emanuel Swedenborg, Michel de Montaigne, Napoleon, and William Shakespeare). Goethe's comments and observations form the basis of several biographical works, notably Johann Peter Eckermann's Conversations with Goethe (1836). His poems were set to music by many composers, including Wolfgang Amadeus Mozart, Ludwig van Beethoven, Franz Schubert, Hector Berlioz, Franz Liszt, Richard Wagner, and Gustav Mahler.

== Life ==
=== Early life ===
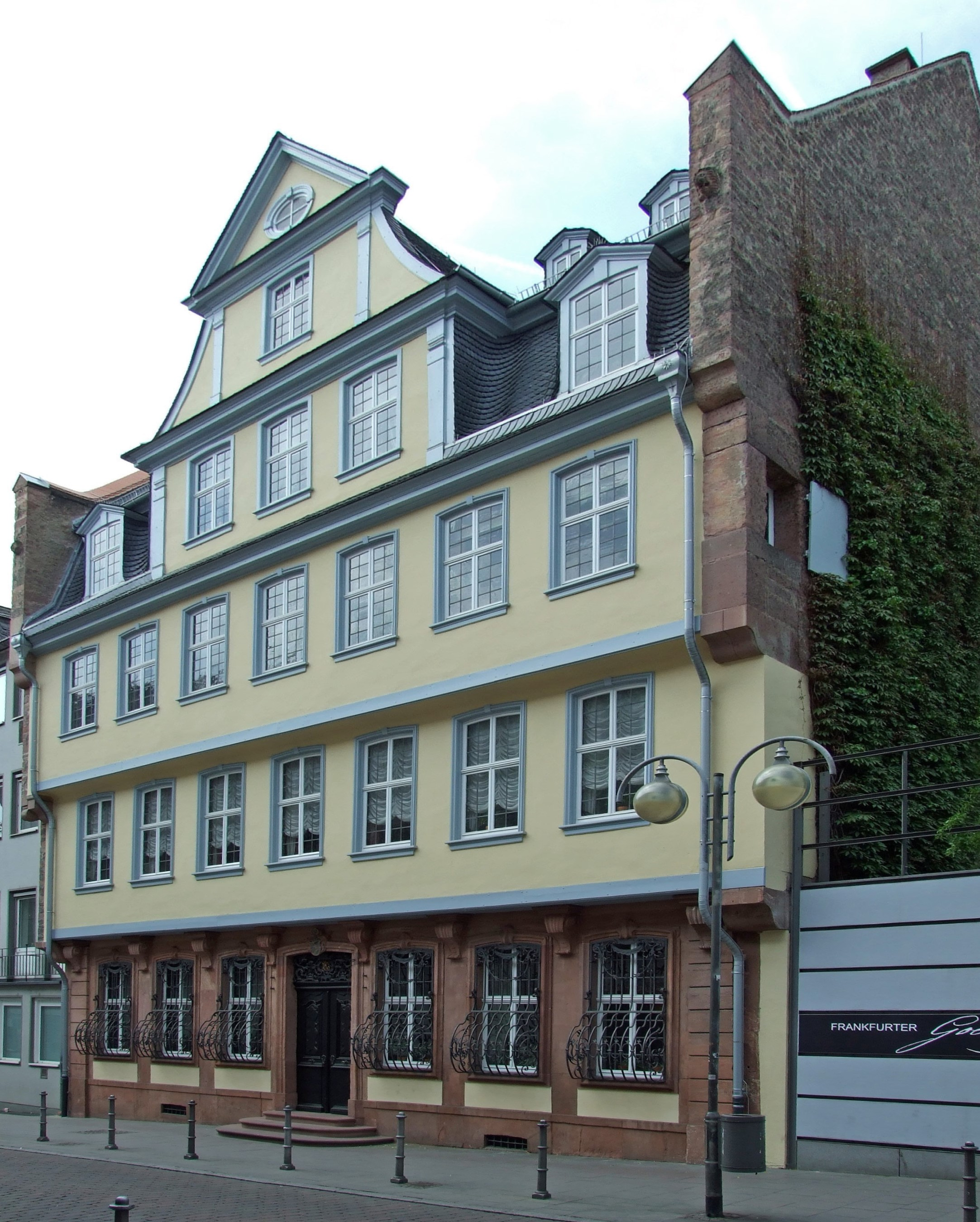
Goethe's birthplace in Frankfurt (Großer Hirschgraben)

Goethe's grandfather, Friedrich Georg Goethe, moved from Thuringia in 1687 and changed the spelling of his surname from Göthe to Goethe. In Frankfurt, he first worked as a tailor, then opened a tavern. His son and grandchildren subsequently lived on the fortune he earned. Friedrich Georg Goethe was married twice; his first marriage was to Anna Elisabeth Lutz, the daughter of a burgher, Sebastian Lutz, with whom he had five children, including Hermann Jakob Goethe. After the death of his first wife in 1705, he married Cornelia Schellhorn, née Walther, widow of the innkeeper Johannes Schellhorn (died 1704), with whom he had four more children, including Johann Caspar Goethe, father of Johann Wolfgang von Goethe.

Goethe's father, Johann Caspar Goethe, lived with his family in a large house (today the Goethe House) in Frankfurt, then a free imperial city of the Holy Roman Empire. Though he had studied law in Leipzig and had been appointed Imperial Councillor, Johann Caspar Goethe was not involved in the city's official affairs. Johann Caspar married Goethe's mother, Catharina Elisabeth Textor, in Frankfurt on 20 August 1748, when he was 38 and she was 17. All their children, with the exception of Johann Wolfgang and his sister Cornelia Friederica Christiana, died at an early age.

The young Goethe received from his father and private tutors lessons in subjects common at the time, especially languages (Latin, Greek, Biblical Hebrew (briefly), French, Italian, and English). Goethe also received lessons in dancing, riding, and fencing. Johann Caspar, feeling frustrated in his own ambitions, was determined that his children should have every advantage he had missed.

Although Goethe's great passion was drawing, he quickly became interested in literature; Friedrich Gottlieb Klopstock and Homer were among his early favourites. He also had a devotion to the theater, and was greatly fascinated by the puppet shows that were annually arranged by occupying French soldiers at his home and which later became a recurrent theme in his literary work Wilhelm Meister's Apprenticeship.

He also took great pleasure in reading works on history and religion. Of this period, he wrote:

I had from childhood the singular habit of always learning by heart the beginnings of books, and the divisions of a work, first of the five books of Moses, and then of the Aeneid and Ovid's Metamorphoses [...] If an ever active imagination, of which that tale may bear witness, led me hither and thither, if the medley of fable and history, mythology and religion, threatened to bewilder me, I readily fled to those oriental regions, and plunged into the first books of Moses, and there, amid the scattered shepherd tribes, found myself at once in the greatest solitude and the greatest society.

Goethe also became acquainted with Frankfurt actors. Valerian Tornius wrote: Goethe – Leben, Wirken und Schaffen. In early literary attempts, Goethe showed an infatuation with Gretchen, who would later reappear in his Faust, and the adventures with whom he would describe concisely in Dichtung und Wahrheit. He adored Caritas Meixner, a wealthy Worms merchant's daughter and friend of his sister, who later married the merchant G. F. Schuler.

=== Legal career ===
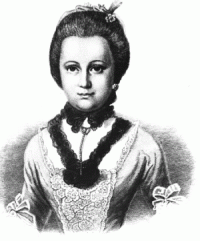
Anna Katharina (Käthchen) Schönkopf

Goethe studied law at Leipzig University from 1765 to 1768. He detested learning judicial rules by heart, preferring instead to attend the lessons of the university professor and poet Christian Fürchtegott Gellert. In Leipzig, Goethe fell in love with Anna Katharina Schönkopf, the daughter of a craftsman and innkeeper, writing cheerful verses about her in the Rococo genre. In 1770, he released anonymously his first collection of poems, Annette. His uncritical admiration for many contemporary poets evaporated as he developed an interest in Gotthold Ephraim Lessing and Christoph Martin Wieland. By this time, Goethe had already written a great deal, but he discarded nearly all of these works except for the comedy Die Mitschuldigen. The inn Auerbachs Keller and its legend of Johann Georg Faust's 1525 barrel ride impressed him so much that Auerbachs Keller became the only real place in his closet drama Faust Part One. Given that he was making little progress in his formal studies, Goethe was forced to return to Frankfurt at the end of August 1768.

Back in Frankfurt, Goethe became severely ill. During the year and a half that followed, marked by several relapses, relations with his father worsened. During convalescence, Goethe was nursed by his mother and sister. In April 1770, Goethe left Frankfurt to finish his studies, this time at the University of Strasbourg.

In Alsace, Goethe blossomed. No other landscape was to be described by him as affectionately as the warm, wide Rhineland. In Strasbourg, Goethe met Johann Gottfried Herder. The two became close friends, and crucially to Goethe's intellectual development, Herder kindled his interest in William Shakespeare, Ossian and in the notion of Volkspoesie (folk poetry). On 14 October 1772, Goethe hosted a gathering in his parents' home in honour of the first German "Shakespeare Day". His first acquaintance with Shakespeare's works is described as his personal awakening in the field of literature.

On a trip to the village of Sessenheim in October 1770, Goethe fell in love with Friederike Brion, but the tryst ended in August 1771. Several of Goethe's poems, like "Willkommen und Abschied", "Sesenheimer Lieder" and "Heidenröslein", date to this period.

At the end of August 1771, Goethe acquired the academic degree of the Licentiate in Law from Strasbourg and was able to establish a small legal practice in Frankfurt. Although in his academic work he had given voice to an ambition to make jurisprudence progressively more humane, his inexperience led him to proceed too vigorously in his first cases, for which he was reprimanded and lost further clientele. Within a few months, this put an early end to his law career. Around this time, Goethe became acquainted with the court of Darmstadt, where his inventiveness was praised. It was from that world that there came Johann Georg Schlosser (who later became Goethe's brother-in-law) and Johann Heinrich Merck. Goethe also pursued literary plans again; this time, his father did not object and even helped. Goethe obtained a copy of the biography of a noble highwayman from the German Peasants' War. In a couple of weeks, the biography was reworked into a colourful drama titled Götz von Berlichingen, and the work struck a chord among Goethe's contemporaries.

Since Goethe could not subsist on his income as one of the editors of a literary periodical (published by Schlosser and Merck), in May 1772, he once more took up the practice of law, this time at Wetzlar. In 1774, he wrote the book which would bring him worldwide fame, The Sorrows of Young Werther. The broad shape of the work's plot is largely based on what Goethe experienced during his time at Wetzlar with Charlotte Buff and her fiancé, Johann Christian Kestner, as well as the suicide of the Goethes' friend Karl Wilhelm Jerusalem. In the latter case, Goethe made a desperate passion of what was in reality a hearty and relaxed friendship. Despite the immense success of Werther, it did not bring Goethe much financial gain since the protection later afforded by copyright laws at that time virtually did not exist. In later years, Goethe would counter this problem by periodically authorizing "new, revised" editions of his Complete Works.

=== Early years in Weimar ===
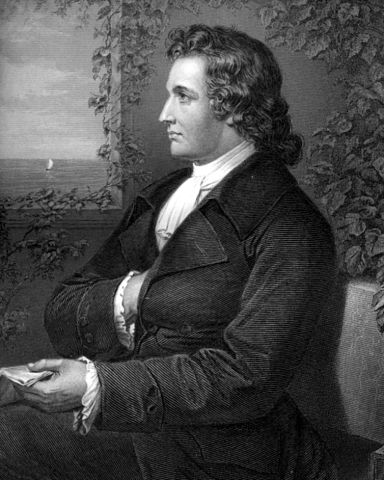
Goethe c. 1775

In 1775, on the strength of his fame as the author of The Sorrows of Young Werther, Goethe was invited to the court of Karl August, Duke of Saxe-Weimar-Eisenach, who later became Grand Duke in 1815. The Duke's mother, Duchess Anna Amalia, had been the long-time regent on behalf of her son until 1775 and was one of the most important patrons of the arts in her day, making her court into a centre of the arts. Her court had hosted the renowned theatre company of Abel Seyler until a 1774 fire had destroyed Schloss Weimar. Karl August came of age when he turned eighteen in 1775, although his mother continued to be a major presence at the court. So it was that Goethe took up residence in Weimar, where he remained for the rest of his life and where, over the course of many years, he held a succession of offices, including superintendent of the ducal library. He was, moreover, the Duke's friend and chief adviser.

In 1776, Goethe formed a close relationship with Charlotte von Stein, a married woman seven years older than him. The intimate bond with her lasted for ten years, after which Goethe abruptly left for Italy without giving his companion any notice. She was emotionally distraught at the time, but they were eventually reconciled.

Aside from his official duties, Goethe was also a friend and confidant to Duke Karl August and participated in the activities of the court. For Goethe, his first ten years at Weimar could well be described as a garnering of a degree and range of experiences which perhaps could have been achieved in no other way. In 1779, Goethe took on the War Commission of the Grand Duchy of Saxe-Weimar, in addition to the Mines and Highways commissions. In 1782, when the Duchy's chancellor of the Exchequer left his office, Goethe agreed to act in his place and did so for two and a half years; this post virtually made him prime minister and the principal representative of the Duchy. Goethe was ennobled in 1782 (hence the particle "von" in his name). In that same year, Goethe moved into what would be his primary residence in Weimar for the next 50 years.

As head of the Saxe-Weimar War Commission, Goethe participated in the recruitment of mercenaries into the Prussian and British military during the American Revolution. The author Daniel Wilson claims that Goethe engaged in negotiating the forced sale of vagabonds, criminals, and political dissidents as part of these activities.

=== Italy ===
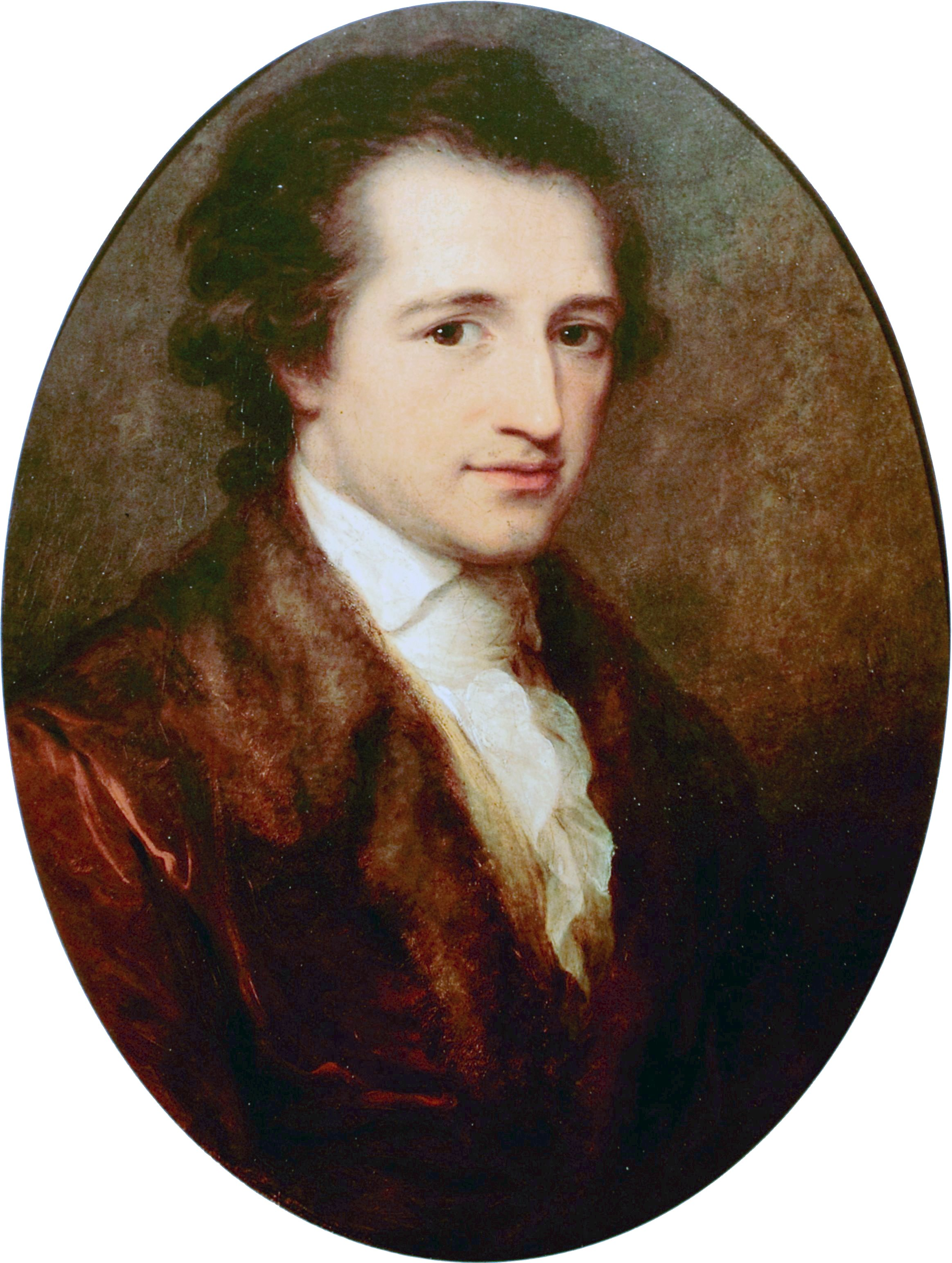
Goethe, age 38, painted by Angelica Kauffman, 1787

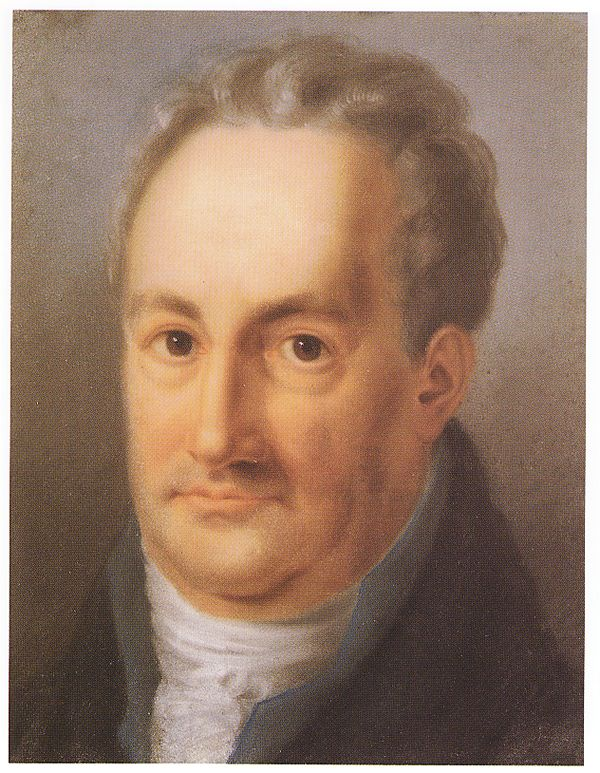
Goethe, by Luise Seidler (Weimar 1811)

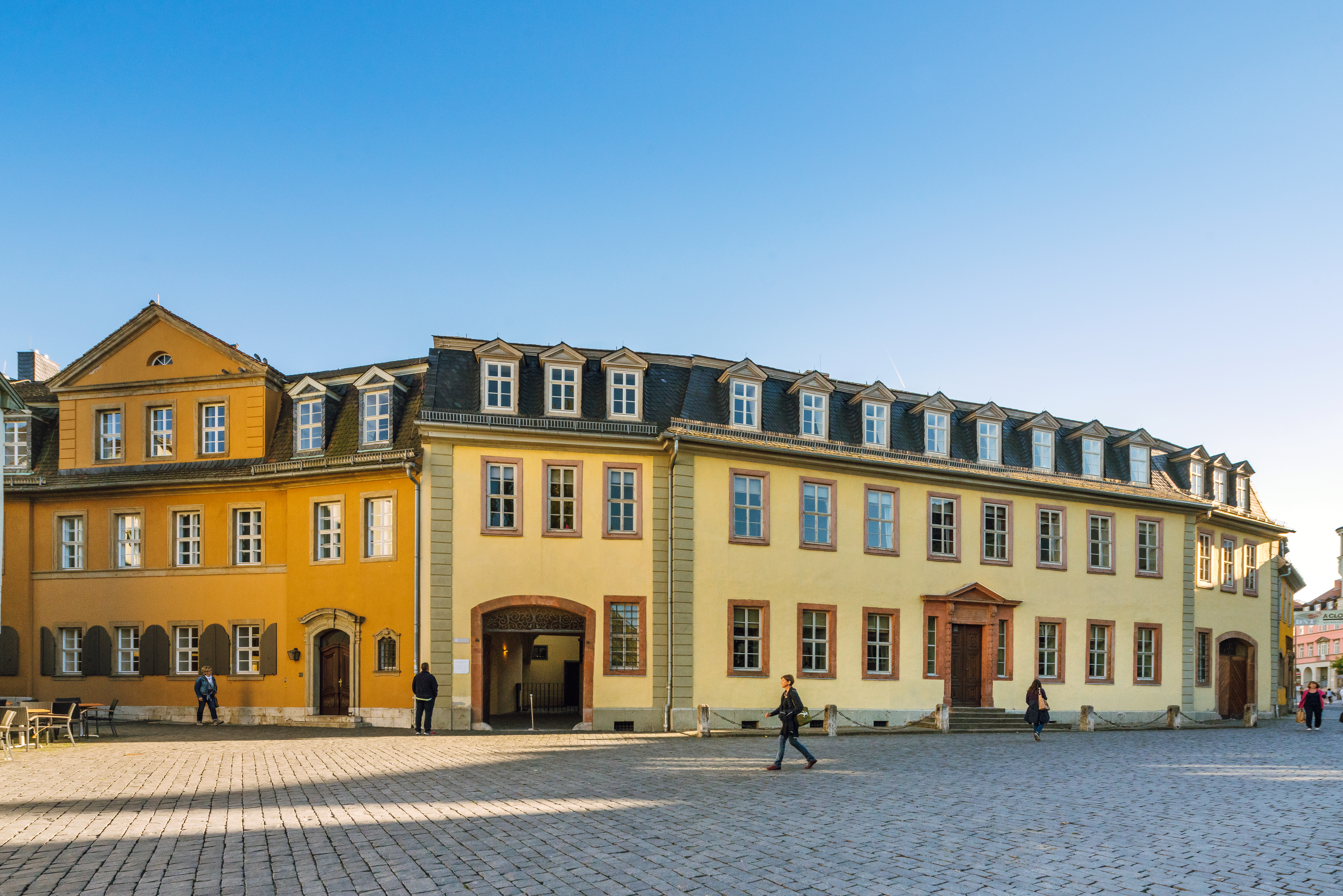
Goethe's residence and museum

Goethe's journey to the Italian peninsula and Sicily from 1786 to 1788 was of great significance in his aesthetic and philosophical development. His father had made a similar journey, and his example was a major motivating factor for Goethe to make the trip. More importantly, however, the work of Johann Joachim Winckelmann had provoked a general renewed interest in the classical art of ancient Greece and Rome. Thus, Goethe's journey had something of the nature of a pilgrimage to it. During the course of his trip, Goethe met and befriended the artists Angelica Kauffman and Johann Heinrich Wilhelm Tischbein, as well as encountering such notable characters as Lady Hamilton and Alessandro Cagliostro.

He also journeyed to Sicily during this time, and wrote that "To have seen Italy without having seen Sicily is to not have seen Italy at all, for Sicily is the clue to everything." While in Southern Italy and Sicily, Goethe encountered, for the first time genuine Greek (as opposed to Roman) architecture, and was quite startled by its relative simplicity. Winckelmann had not recognized the distinctness of the two styles.

Goethe's diaries of this period form the basis of the non-fiction Italian Journey. Italian Journey only covers the first year of Goethe's visit. The remaining year is largely undocumented, aside from the fact that he spent much of it in Venice. This "gap in the record" has been the source of much speculation over the years.

In the decades which immediately followed its publication in 1816, Italian Journey inspired countless German youths to follow Goethe's example. This is pictured, somewhat satirically, in George Eliot's Middlemarch.

=== Weimar ===
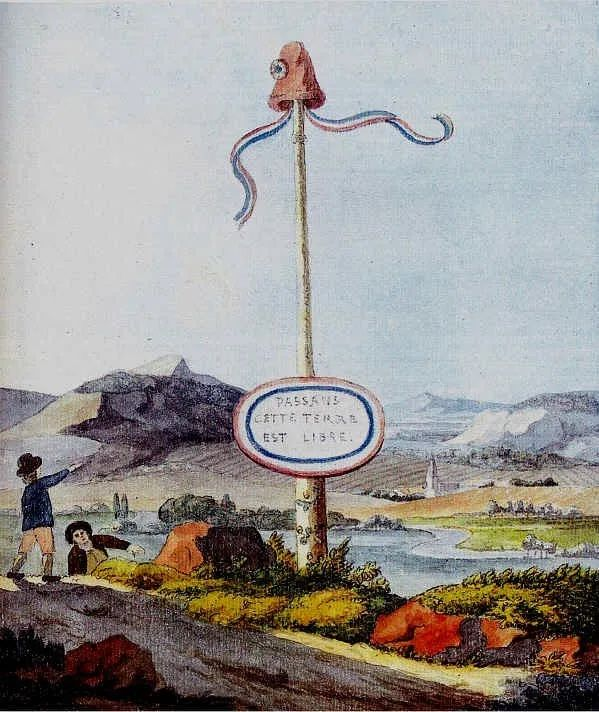
A Goethe watercolour depicting a liberty pole at the border to the short-lived Republic of Mainz, created under influence of the French Revolution and destroyed in the Siege of Mainz in which Goethe participated.

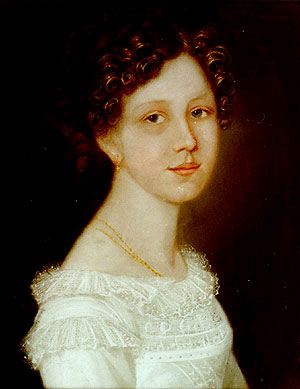
Ulrike von Levetzow

In late 1792, Goethe took part in the Battle of Valmy against revolutionary France, assisting Duke Karl August of Saxe-Weimar-Eisenach during the failed invasion of France. Again, during the Siege of Mainz, he assisted Karl August as a military observer. His written account of these events can be found within his Complete Works.

In 1794, Friedrich Schiller wrote to Goethe offering friendship; they had previously had only a mutually wary relationship ever since first becoming acquainted in 1788. This collaborative friendship lasted until Schiller's death in 1805.

In 1806, Goethe was living in Weimar with his mistress Christiane Vulpius, the sister of Christian A. Vulpius and daughter of archivist Johann Friedrich Vulpius, and their son August von Goethe. On 13 October, Napoleon's army invaded the town. The French "spoon guards", the least disciplined soldiers, occupied Goethe's house:

The "spoon guards" had broken in, they had drunk wine, made a great uproar and called for the master of the house. Goethe's secretary Riemer reports: "Although already undressed and wearing only his wide nightgown [...] he descended the stairs towards them and inquired what they wanted from him [...] His dignified figure, commanding respect, and his spiritual mien seemed to impress even them". But it was not to last long. Late at night, they burst into his bedroom with drawn bayonets. Goethe was petrified, Christiane raised a lot of noise and even tangled with them, other people who had taken refuge in Goethe's house rushed in, and so the marauders eventually withdrew again. It was Christiane who commanded and organized the defence of the house on the Frauenplan. The barricading of the kitchen and the cellar against the wild pillaging soldiery was her work. Goethe noted in his diary: "Fires, rapine, a frightful night [...] Preservation of the house through steadfastness and luck." The luck was Goethe's, the steadfastness was displayed by Christiane.

Days afterward, on 19 October 1806, Goethe legitimized their 18-year relationship by marrying Christiane in a quiet marriage service at the Jakobskirche in Weimar. They had already had several children together by this time, including their son, Julius August Walter von Goethe (1789–1830), whose wife, Ottilie von Pogwisch, cared for the elder Goethe until his death in 1832. August and Ottilie had three children: Walther Wolfgang Freiherr von Goethe (1818–1885), Wolfgang Maximilian von Goethe (1820–1883) and Alma Sedina Henriette Cornelia von Goethe (1827–1844). Christiane von Goethe died in 1816. Johann reflected, "There is nothing more charming to see than a mother with her child in her arms, and there is nothing more venerable than a mother among a number of her children."

=== Later life ===
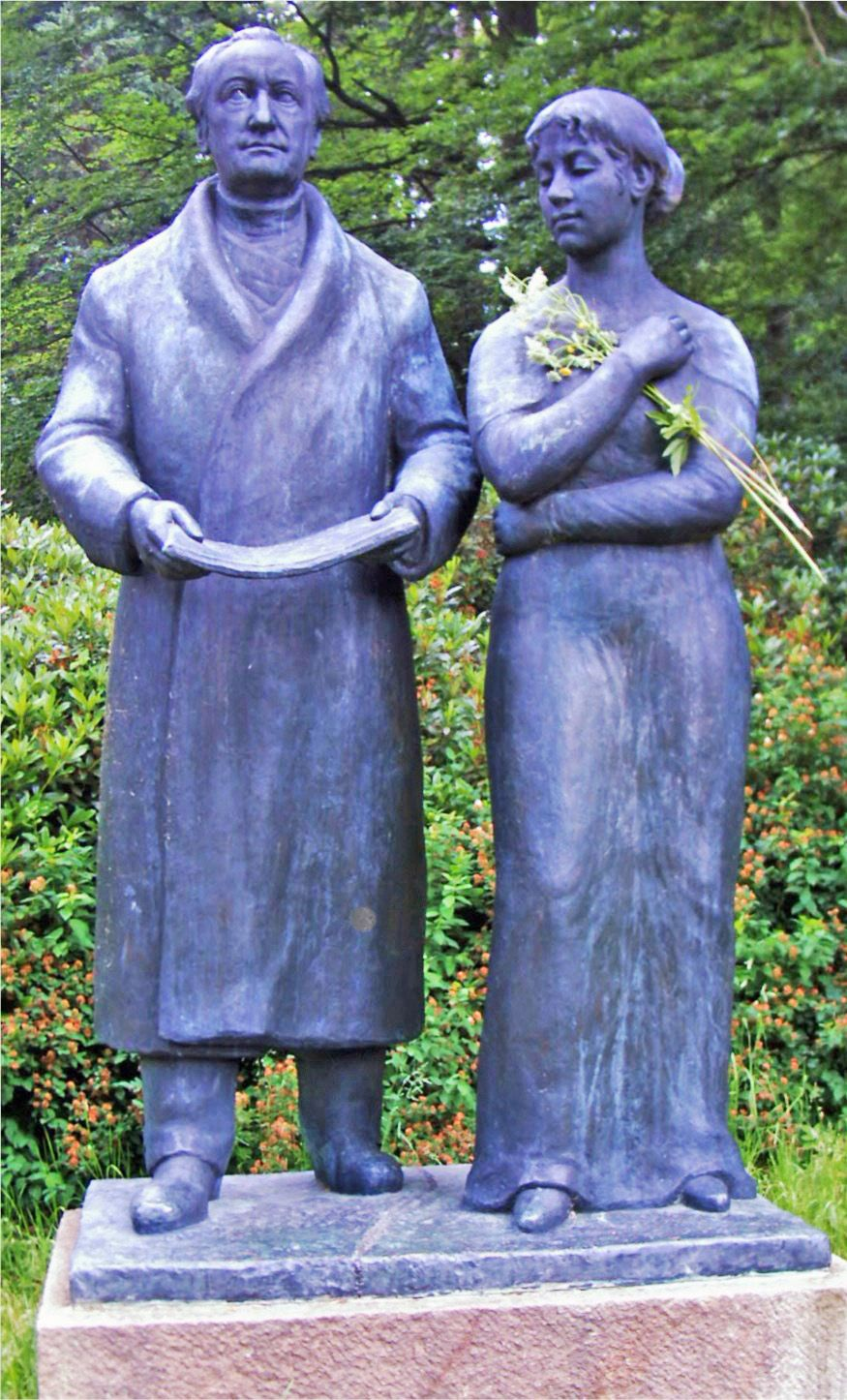
Goethe and Ulrike, sculpture by Heinrich Drake in Marienbad

After 1793, Goethe devoted his endeavours primarily to literature. In 1812, he travelled to Teplice and Vienna, both times meeting his admirer Ludwig van Beethoven, who had set music to Egmont two years prior in 1810. By 1820, Goethe was on amiable terms with Kaspar Maria von Sternberg.

In 1821, having recovered from a near fatal heart illness, the 72-year-old Goethe fell in love with Ulrike von Levetzow, 17 at the time. In 1823, he wanted to marry her, but because of the opposition of her mother, he never proposed. Their last meeting in Carlsbad on 5 September 1823 inspired his poem "Marienbad Elegy" which he considered one of his finest works. During that time he also developed a deep emotional bond with the Polish pianist Maria Szymanowska, 33 at the time, and she separated from her husband.

In 1821, Goethe's friend Carl Friedrich Zelter introduced him to the 12-year-old Felix Mendelssohn. Goethe, now in his seventies, was greatly impressed by the child, leading to perhaps the earliest confirmed comparison to Mozart in the following conversation between Goethe and Zelter:

"Musical prodigies [...] are probably no longer so rare; but what this little man can do in extemporizing and playing at sight borders the miraculous, and I could not have believed it possible at so early an age." "And yet you heard Mozart in his seventh year at Frankfurt?" said Zelter. "Yes", answered Goethe, "[...] but what your pupil already accomplishes, bears the same relation to the Mozart of that time that the cultivated talk of a grown-up person bears to the prattle of a child."

Mendelssohn was invited to meet Goethe on several later occasions, and set a number of Goethe's poems to music. His other compositions inspired by Goethe include the overture Calm Sea and Prosperous Voyage (Op. 27, 1828), and the cantata Die erste Walpurgisnacht (The First Walpurgis Night, Op. 60, 1832).

Heinrich Heine, on his hiking tour through Germany (the trip immortalised in his work Die Harzreise) was granted an audience with Goethe in 1824 in Weimar. Heine had been a great admirer of Goethe's in his early youth, sending him some of his earlier works with praising cover notes. The meeting is said to be of a strikingly unsuccessful nature, with Heine completely omitting the meeting in the Harzreise, and speaking flippantly of it in much later life.

==== Greek War of Independence and its influence on Faust Part Two ====
Goethe was a conservative supporter of Klemens von Metternich who did not support revolutions. For example, he supported the suppression of the Trienio Liberal. Goethe admired the Greeks; by 1818 he had collected over 100 Greek folk songs, translating seven of them. However, he was initially a skeptic of the Greek War of Independence, fearing that its success would increase the power of the Russian Empire, while simultaneously contributing to the destruction of Christians within the Ottoman Empire.

Goethe later departed from this view, sympathizing with the Greeks; he saw the Revolution as an analogue for the Crusades and as highly beneficial to the weakening of the power of the Ottoman Empire. In fact, the Greek War of Independence influenced Goethe so deeply that the death of Lord Byron after the Siege of Messolonghi caused him to resume writing Faust Part Two, which was greatly influenced by the ongoing struggles of the Greeks. Goethe also "reincarnated" Byron, symbolically, in the character of Euphorion.

== Death ==
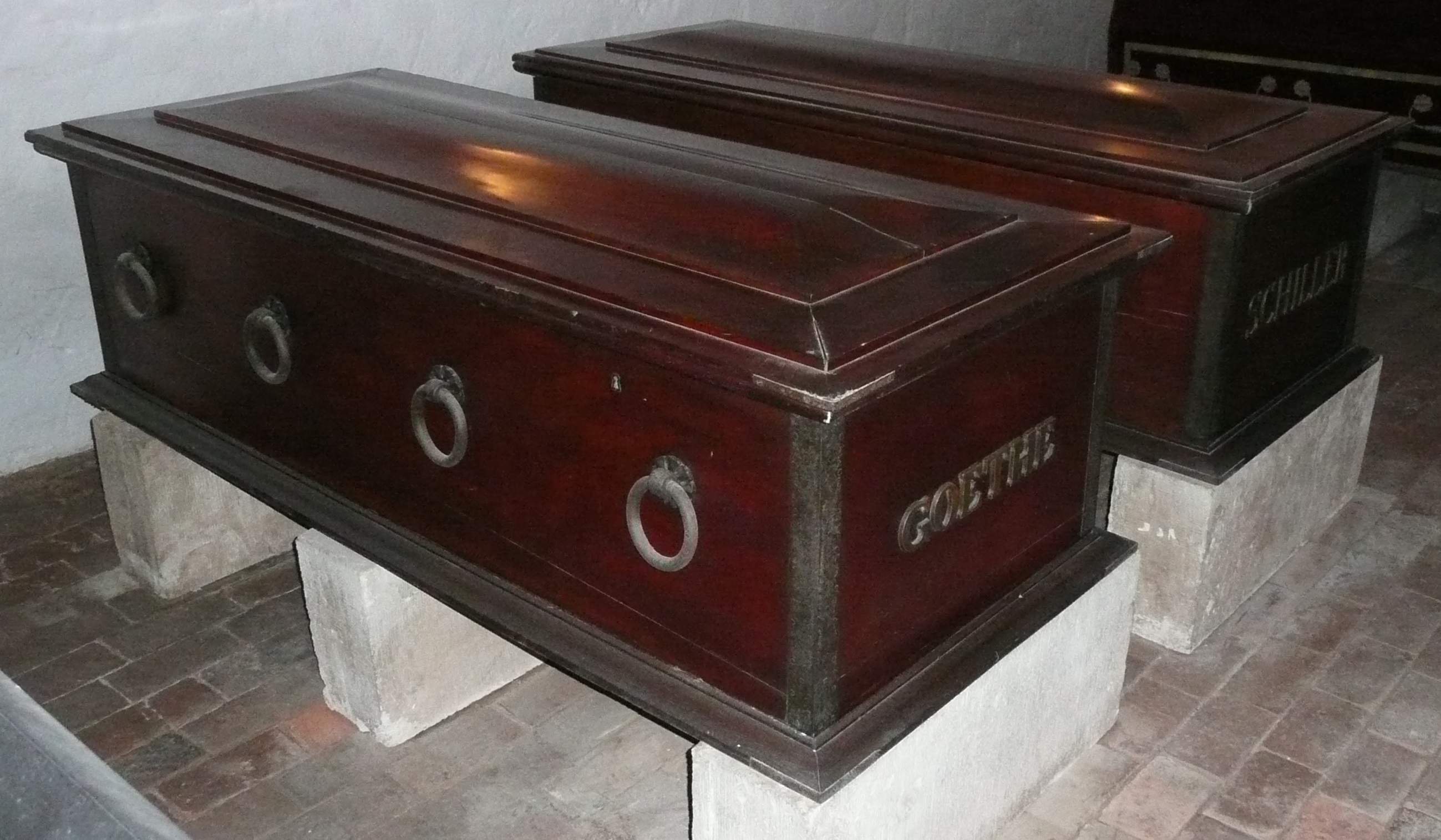
Coffins of Goethe and Schiller, Weimar vault

In 1832, Goethe died in Weimar of apparent heart failure. He is buried in the Ducal Vault at Weimar's Historical Cemetery.

=== Last words ===
The last words of Goethe are usually abridged as Mehr Licht!, that is, "more light!", although the original quote was longer.

The earliest known account was of Karl Wilhelm Müller's, which gives all of his last words: "Macht doch den zweiten Fensterladen in der Stube auch auf, damit mehr Licht hereinkomme." ("Open the second shutter in the living room so that more light comes in.")

According to his doctor Carl Vogel, his last words were, Mehr Licht! (More light!), but this is disputed as Vogel was not in the room at the moment Goethe died, something he himself says in his account: "[...] "More light" is said to have been the last words of the man, who always hated darkness in every respect, as I had left the dying room for a moment [...]"

Thomas Carlyle, in his letter to John Carlyle (2 July 1832) records that he had learned the version Macht die Fensterladen auf, damit ich mehr Licht bekomme! ("Open the shutters so I can get more light!") from Sarah Austin: "[...] Mrs. Austin wrote lately that Goethe's last words were, Macht die Fensterladen auf, damit ich mehr Licht bekomme! Glorious man! Happy man! I never think of him but with reverence and pride [...]" John Ruskin, in his Præterita, narrates a memory of him from his diary record of 25 October 1874 that Carlyle "[...] had been quoting the last words of Goethe, "Open the window, let us have more light" (this about an hour before painless death, his eyes failing him)."

Even though the context was different, these words, especially the abridged version, which turned into a dictum, are usually used as a means to illustrate the pro-Enlightenment worldview of Goethe.

=== Aftermath ===
The first production of Richard Wagner's opera Lohengrin took place in Weimar in 1850. The conductor was Franz Liszt, who chose the date 28 August in honour of Goethe, who was born on 28 August 1749.

=== Descendants ===
Goethe had five children with Christiane Vulpius. Only their eldest son, August, survived into adulthood. One child was stillborn, while the others died early. Through his son August and daughter-in-law Ottilie, Johann had three grandchildren: Walther, Wolfgang and Alma. Alma died of typhoid fever during the outbreak in Vienna, at age 16. Walther and Wolfgang neither married nor had any children. Walther's gravestone states: "With him ends Goethe's dynasty, the name will last forever," marking the end of Goethe's personal bloodline. While he has no direct descendants, his siblings do.

== Persona ==
The epithet "Olympian," referring to loftiness, serenity and objectivity, is often applied to Goethe. Sainte-Beuve argued that the "Olympian" quality was the essential characteristic of the German poetic type, and contrasted Goethe with Voltaire.

Goethe has been described as devoted to the sense of taste, order, and finely crafted detail that was the hallmark of the Age of Reason and the neo-classical period, while also seeking a personal and intuitive form of expression and society. He has been compared to Adam Smith, Thomas Jefferson, and Ludwig van Beethoven, for his combination of interests.

== Literature ==
Goethe's work could be lushly emotional, and rigorously formal, brief and epigrammatic, and epic. He would argue that Classicism was the means of controlling art, and that Romanticism was a sickness, even as he penned poetry rich in memorable images. Goethe rewrote the formal rules of German poetry.

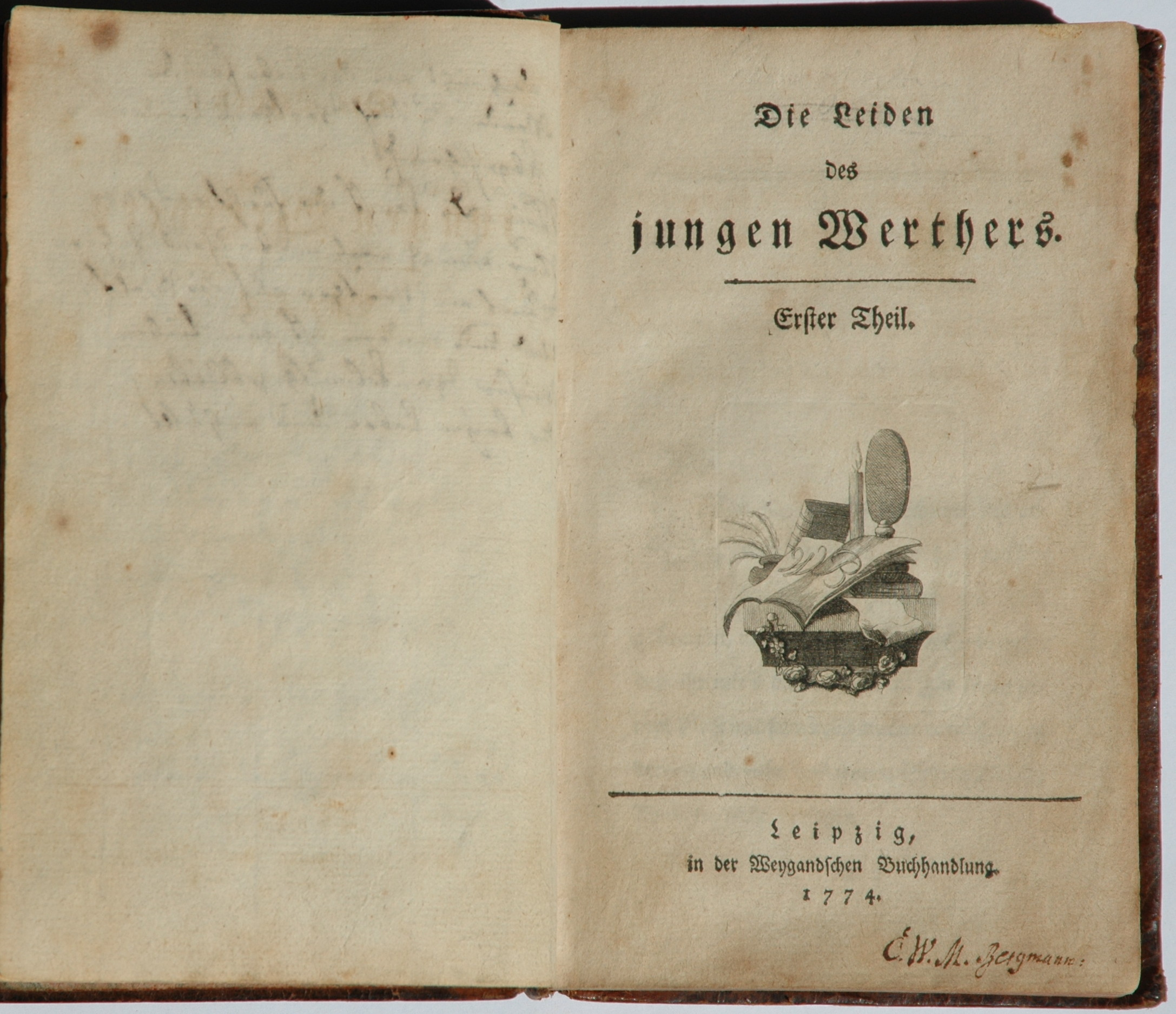
First edition of The Sorrows of Young Werther

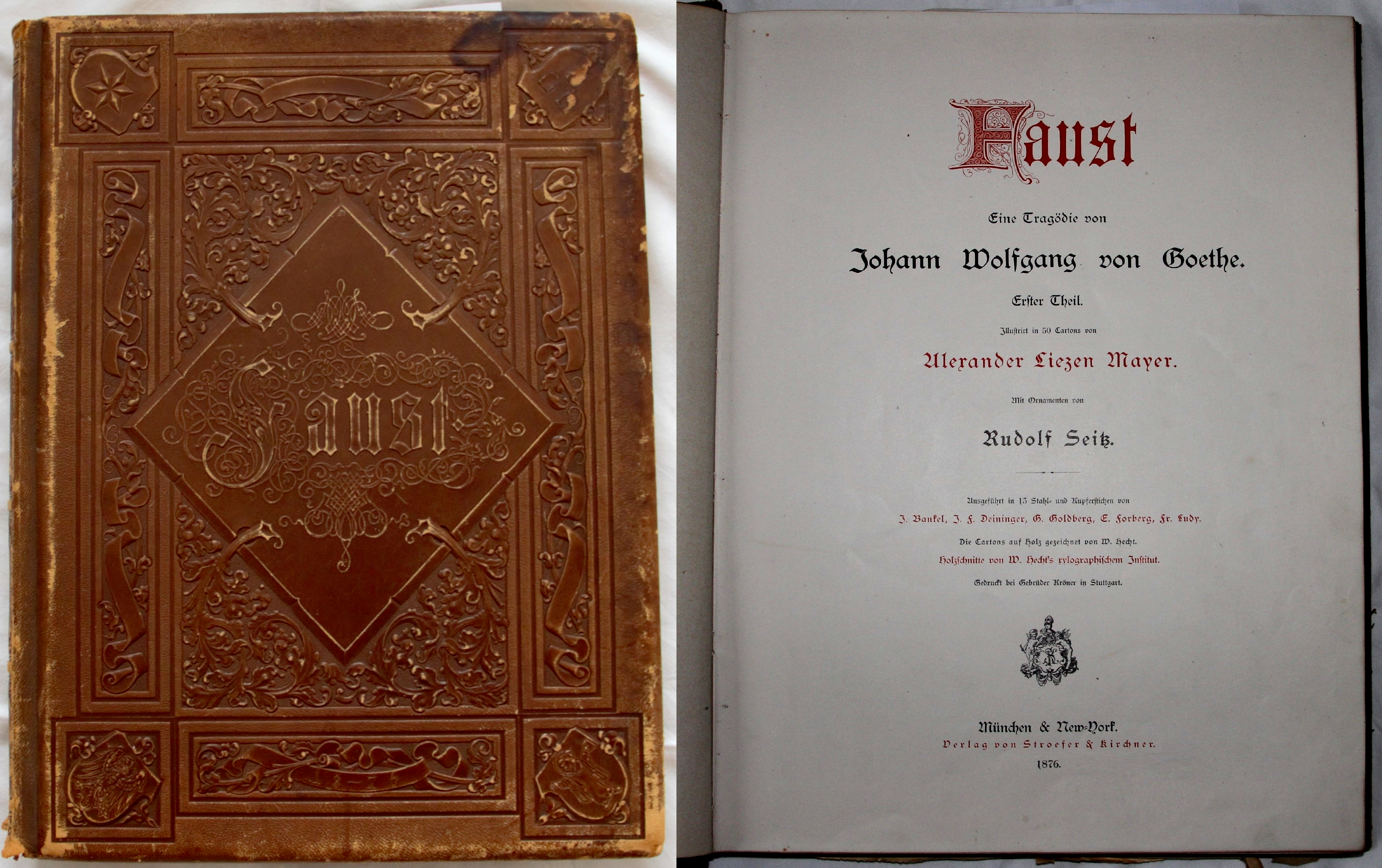
1876 "Faust" by Goethe, decorated by Rudolf Seitz, large German edition 51x38cm

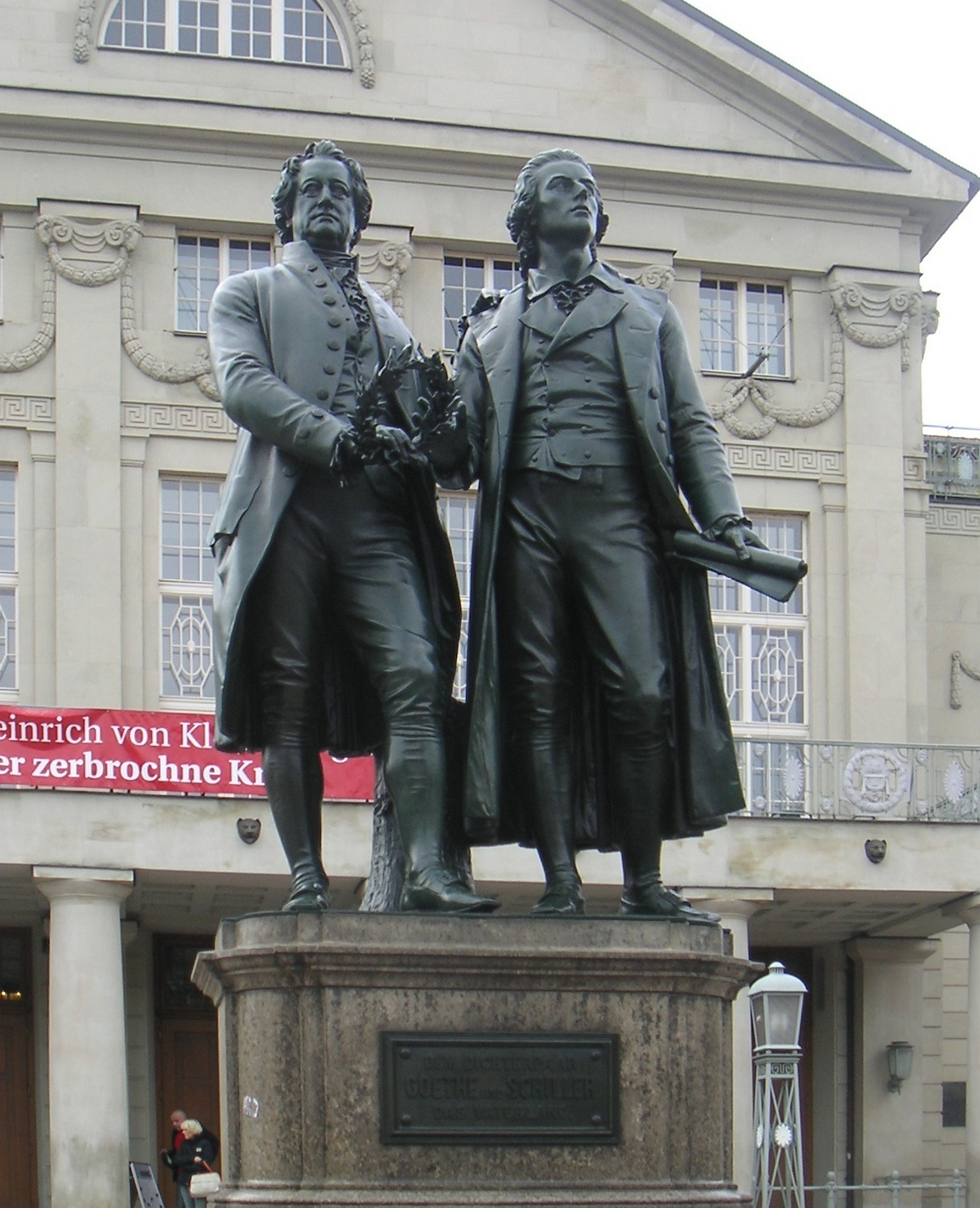
Goethe–Schiller Monument, Weimar (1857)

The most important of Goethe's works produced before he went to Weimar were Götz von Berlichingen (1773), a tragedy that was the first work to bring him recognition, and the novel The Sorrows of Young Werther (German: Die Leiden des jungen Werthers) (1774), which gained him enormous fame as a writer in the Sturm und Drang period which marked the early phase of Romanticism. Indeed, Werther is often considered to be the "spark" which ignited the movement, and can arguably be called the world's first "best-seller". During the years at Weimar before he met Schiller in 1794, he began Wilhelm Meister's Apprenticeship and wrote the dramas Iphigenie auf Tauris (Iphigenia in Tauris), Egmont, and Torquato Tasso and the fable Reineke Fuchs.

To the period of his friendship with Schiller belong the conception of Wilhelm Meister's Journeyman Years (the continuation of Wilhelm Meister's Apprenticeship), the idyll of Hermann and Dorothea, the Roman Elegies and the verse drama The Natural Daughter. In the last period, between Schiller's death, in 1805, and his own, appeared Faust Part One (1808), Elective Affinities (1809), the West-Eastern Diwan (an 1819 collection of poems in the Persian style, influenced by the work of Hafez), his autobiographical Aus meinem Leben: Dichtung und Wahrheit (From My Life: Poetry and Truth, published between 1811 and 1833) which covers his early life and ends with his departure for Weimar, his Italian Journey (1816–1817), and a series of treatises on art. Faust, Part Two was completed before his 1832 death and published posthumously later that year. His writings were immediately influential in literary and artistic circles.

Goethe was fascinated by Kalidasa's Abhijñānaśākuntalam, which was one of the first works of Sanskrit literature that became known in Europe, after being translated from English to German.

The Faust tragedy/drama, often called Das Drama der Deutschen (the drama of the Germans), written in two parts and published decades apart, is considered his most characteristic and famous artistic creation.

=== Epigrams and quotes ===
Goethe is widely quoted. Epigrams such as "Against criticism a man can neither protest nor defend himself; he must act in spite of it, and then it will gradually yield to him", "Divide and rule, a sound motto; unite and lead, a better one", and "Enjoy when you can, and endure when you must", are still in usage or are often paraphrased. Lines from Faust, such as "Das also war des Pudels Kern", "Das ist der Weisheit letzter Schluss", or "Grau ist alle Theorie" have entered everyday German usage.

Some well-known quotations are often incorrectly attributed to Goethe. These include Hippocrates' "Art is long, life is short", which is echoed in Goethe's Faust and Wilhelm Meister's Apprenticeship.

=== Details of selected works ===
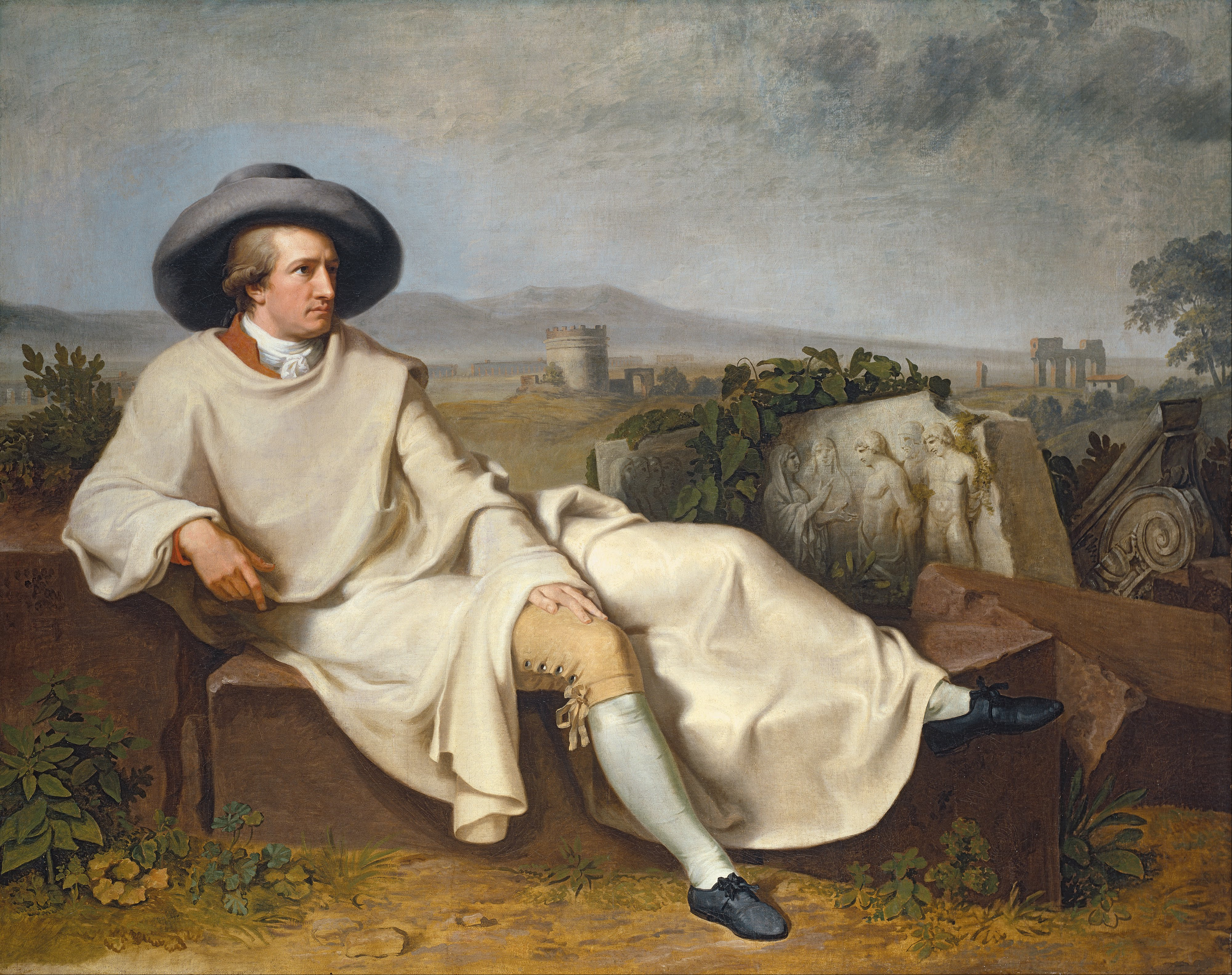
Goethe in the Roman Campagna (1786) by Johann Heinrich Wilhelm Tischbein

The short epistolary novel Die Leiden des jungen Werthers, or The Sorrows of Young Werther, published in 1774, recounts an unhappy romantic infatuation that ends in suicide. Goethe admitted that he "shot his hero to save himself", a reference to Goethe's near-suicidal obsession for a young woman, a passion he quelled through writing. The novel remains in print in dozens of languages and its influence is undeniable; its central hero, an obsessive figure driven to despair and destruction by his unrequited love for the young Lotte, has become a pervasive literary archetype. The fact that Werther ends with the protagonist's suicide and funeral — a funeral which "no clergyman attended" — made the book deeply controversial upon its (anonymous) publication, for it appeared to condone and glorify suicide. Suicide is considered sinful by Christian doctrine, and suicides were denied Christian burial, with the bodies often mutilated. The suicide's property was often confiscated by the Church.

Epistolary novels were common during this time, letter-writing being a primary mode of communication. What set Goethe's book apart from other such novels was its expression of unbridled longing for a joy beyond possibility, its sense of defiant rebellion against authority, and of principal importance, its total subjectivity: qualities that trailblazed the Romantic movement.

The next work, his epic closet drama Faust, was completed in stages. The first part was published in 1808 and created a sensation. Goethe finished Faust Part Two in the year of his death, and the work was published posthumously. Goethe's original draft of a Faust play, which probably dates from 1773 to 1774, and is now known as the Urfaust, was also published after his death.

The first operatic version of Goethe's Faust, by Louis Spohr, appeared in 1814. The work subsequently inspired operas and oratorios by Schumann, Berlioz, Gounod, Boito, Busoni and Schnittke, as well as symphonic works by Liszt, Wagner and Mahler. Faust became the ur-myth of many figures in the 19th century. Later, a facet of its plot, i.e., of selling one's soul to the devil for power over the physical world, took on increasing literary importance and became a view of the victory of technology and of industrialism, along with its dubious human expenses. In 1919, the world premiere complete production of Faust was staged at the Goetheanum.

Goethe's poetic work served as a model for an entire movement in German poetry termed Innerlichkeit ("introversion") and represented by, for example, Heine. Goethe's words inspired a number of compositions by, among others, Mozart, Beethoven (who idolised Goethe), Schubert, Berlioz and Wolf. Perhaps the single most influential piece is "Mignon's Song", which opens with one of the most famous lines in German poetry, an allusion to Italy: "Kennst du das Land, wo die Zitronen blühn?" ("Do you know the land where the lemon trees bloom?").

== Scientific work ==
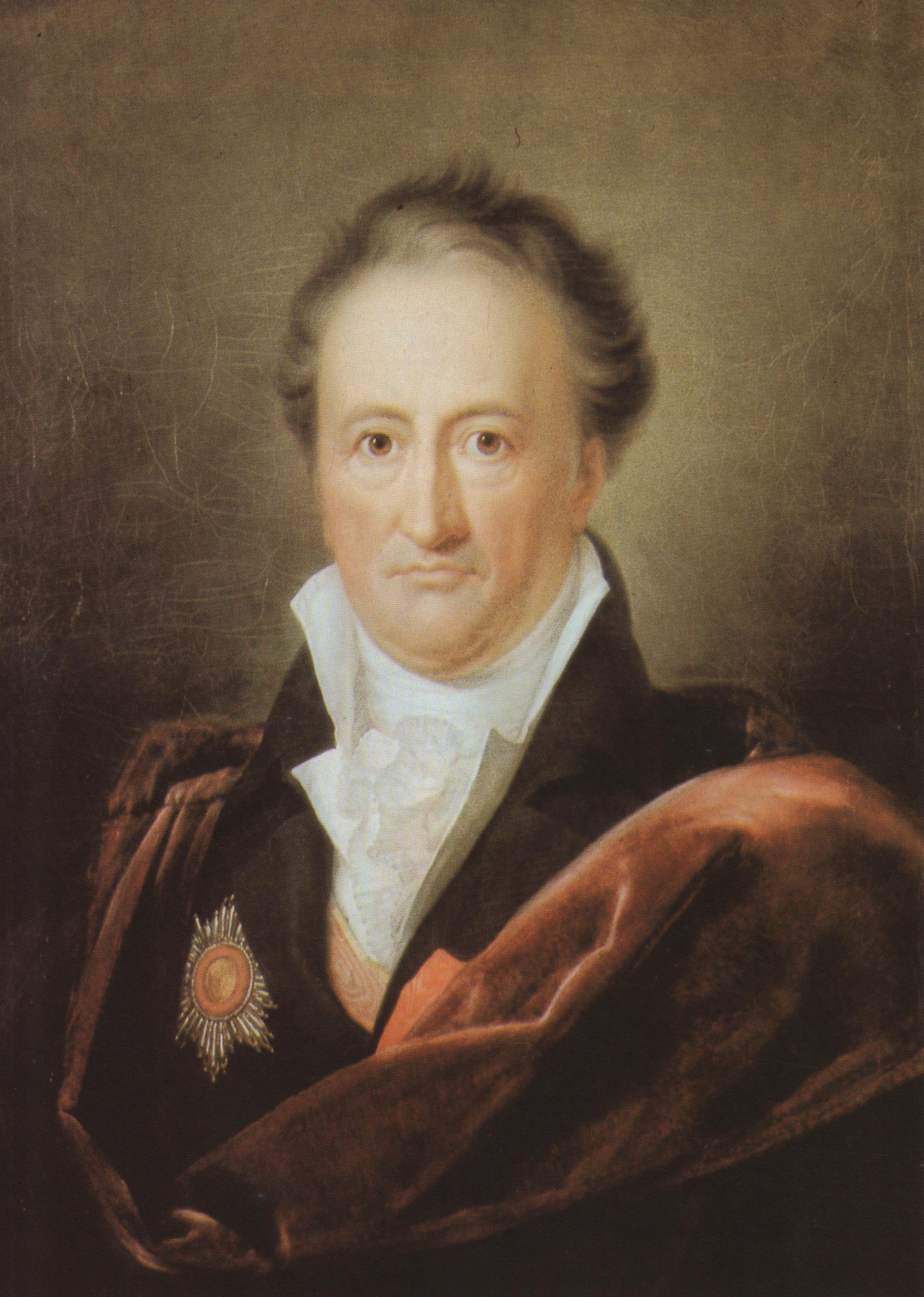
Goethe in 1810. Gerhard von Kügelgen

Light spectrum, from Theory of Colours. Goethe observed that with a prism, colour arises at light-dark edges, and the spectrum occurs where these coloured edges overlap.

As to what I have done as a poet [...] I take no pride in it [...] But that in my century I am the only person who knows the truth in the difficult science of colours — of that, I say, I am not a little proud, and here I have a consciousness of a superiority to many.

— Johann Eckermann, Conversations with Goethe

Although his literary work has attracted the most interest, Goethe was also keenly involved in studies of natural science. He wrote several works on morphology and colour theory. In the 1790s, he undertook Galvanic experiments and studied anatomical issues together with Alexander von Humboldt. He also had the largest private collection of minerals in all of Europe. By the time of his death, to gain a comprehensive view of geology, he had collected 17,800 rock samples.

His focus on morphology and what was later called homology influenced 19th-century naturalists, although his ideas of transformation were about the continuous metamorphosis of living things and did not relate to contemporary ideas of "transformisme" or transmutation of species. Homology, or as Étienne Geoffroy Saint-Hilaire called it "analogie", was used by Charles Darwin as strong evidence of common descent and of laws of variation. Goethe's studies (notably with an elephant's skull lent to him by Samuel Thomas von Soemmerring) led him to independently discover the human intermaxillary bone, also known as "Goethe's bone", in 1784, which Broussonet (1779) and Vicq d'Azyr (1780) had (using different methods) identified several years earlier. While not the only one in his time to question the prevailing view that this bone did not exist in humans, Goethe, who believed ancient anatomists had known about this bone, was the first to prove its existence in all mammals. The elephant's skull that led Goethe to this discovery, and was subsequently named the Goethean Elephant, is displayed in the Ottoneum in Kassel, Germany.

During his Italian journey, Goethe formulated a theory of plant metamorphosis in which the archetypal form of the plant is to be found in the leaf – he writes, "from top to bottom a plant is all leaf, united so inseparably with the future bud that one cannot be imagined without the other". In 1790, he published his Metamorphosis of Plants. As one of the many precursors in the history of evolutionary thought, Goethe wrote in Story of My Botanical Studies (1831):

The ever-changing display of plant forms, which I have followed for so many years, awakens increasingly within me the notion: The plant forms which surround us were not all created at some given point in time and then locked into the given form, they have been given [...] a felicitous mobility and plasticity that allows them to grow and adapt themselves to many different conditions in many different places.

Goethe's botanical theories were partly based on his gardening in Weimar.

Goethe also popularized the Goethe barometer using a principle established by Torricelli. According to Hegel, "Goethe has occupied himself a good deal with meteorology; barometer readings interested him particularly [...] What he says is important: the main thing is that he gives a comparative table of barometric readings during the whole month of December 1822, at Weimar, Jena, London, Boston, Vienna, Töpel [...] He claims to deduce from it that the barometric level varies in the same proportion not only in each zone but that it has the same variation, too, at different altitudes above sea-level".

In 1810, Goethe published his Theory of Colours, which he considered his most important work. In it, he contentiously characterized colour as arising from the dynamic interplay of light and darkness through the mediation of a turbid medium. In 1816, Schopenhauer went on to develop his own theory in On Vision and Colours based on the observations supplied in Goethe's book. After being translated into English by Charles Eastlake in 1840, his theory became widely adopted by the art world, most notably J. M. W. Turner. Goethe's work also inspired the philosopher Ludwig Wittgenstein, to write his Remarks on Colour. Goethe was vehemently opposed to Newton's analytic treatment of colour, engaging instead in compiling a comprehensive rational description of a wide variety of colour phenomena. Although Goethe's empirical observations were largely accurate, his aesthetic approach failed to meet the standards of analytic and mathematical analysis used ubiquitously in modern Science. Goethe was, however, the first to systematically study the physiological effects of colour, and his observations on the effect of opposed colours led him to a symmetric arrangement of his colour wheel, "for the colours diametrically opposed to each other [...] are those which reciprocally evoke each other in the eye." In this, he anticipated Ewald Hering's opponent colour theory (1872).

Goethe outlines his method in the essay The experiment as mediator between subject and object (1772). In the Kurschner edition of Goethe's works, the science editor, Rudolf Steiner, presents Goethe's approach to science as phenomenological. Steiner elaborated on that in the books The Theory of Knowledge Implicit in Goethe's World-Conception and Goethe's World View, in which he characterizes intuition as the instrument by which one grasps Goethe's biological archetype — The Typus.

Novalis, himself a geologist and mining engineer, expressed the opinion that Goethe was the first physicist of his time and "epoch-making in the history of physics", writing that Goethe's studies of light, of the metamorphosis of plants and of insects were indications and proofs "that the perfect educational lecture belongs in the artist's sphere of work"; and that Goethe would be surpassed "but only in the way in which the ancients can be surpassed, in inner content and force, in variety and depth — as an artist actually not, or only very little, for his rightness and intensity are perhaps already more exemplary than it would seem".

Goethe praised Francis Bacon for his advocacy of science based on experiment and his forceful revolution in thought as one of the greatest strides forward in modern science. However, he was critical of Bacon's inductive method and approach based on pure classification. He said in Scientific Studies:

We conceive of the individual animal as a small world, existing for its own sake, by its own means. Every creature is its own reason to be. All its parts have a direct effect on one another, a relationship to one another, thereby constantly renewing the circle of life; thus, we are justified in considering every animal physiologically perfect. Viewed from within, no part of the animal is a useless or arbitrary product of the formative impulse (as so often thought). Externally, some parts may seem useless because the inner coherence of the animal nature has given them this form without regard to outer circumstance. Thus...[not] the question, What are they for? But rather, where do they come from?

Goethe's scientific and aesthetic ideas have much in common with Denis Diderot, whose work he translated and studied. Both Diderot and Goethe exhibited a repugnance towards the mathematical interpretation of nature; both perceived the universe as dynamic and in constant flux; both saw "art and science as compatible disciplines linked by common imaginative processes"; and both grasped "the unconscious impulses underlying mental creation in all forms." Goethe's Naturanschauer is in many ways a sequel to Diderot's interprète de la nature.

== Eroticism ==
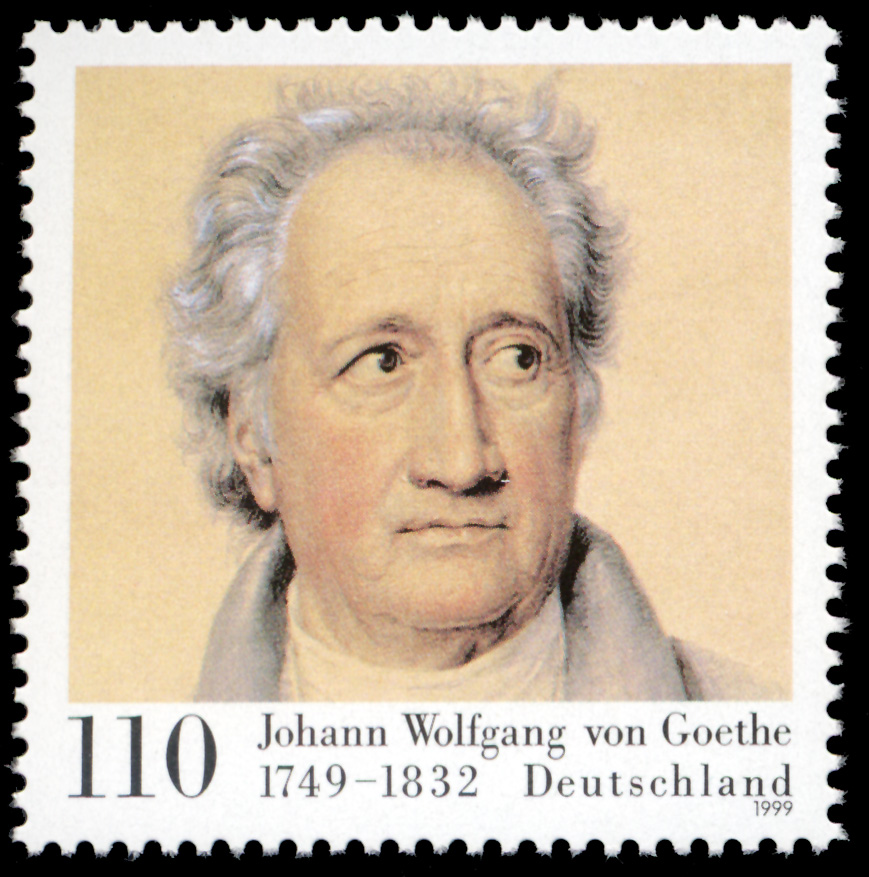
Goethe on a 1999 German stamp

Many of Goethe's works, especially Faust, the Roman Elegies, and the Venetian Epigrams, depict erotic passions and acts. For instance, in Faust, the first use of Faust's power after signing a contract with the Devil is to seduce a teenage girl. Some of the Venetian Epigrams were held back from publication due to their sexual content. Goethe clearly saw human sexuality as a topic worthy of poetic and artistic depiction, an idea that was uncommon in a time when the private nature of sexuality was rigorously normative.

In a conversation on 7 April 1830, Goethe stated that pederasty is an "aberration" that easily leads to "animal, roughly material" behaviour. He continued, "Pederasty is as old as humanity itself, and one can therefore say that it resides in nature, even if it proceeds against nature [...] What culture has won from nature will not be surrendered or given up at any price." In one of his epigrams, which are often facetious and satirical, he wrote: "I love boys as well, but girls are even dearer to me. If I tire of her as a girl, she'll serve as a boy for me as well".

== Religion and politics ==
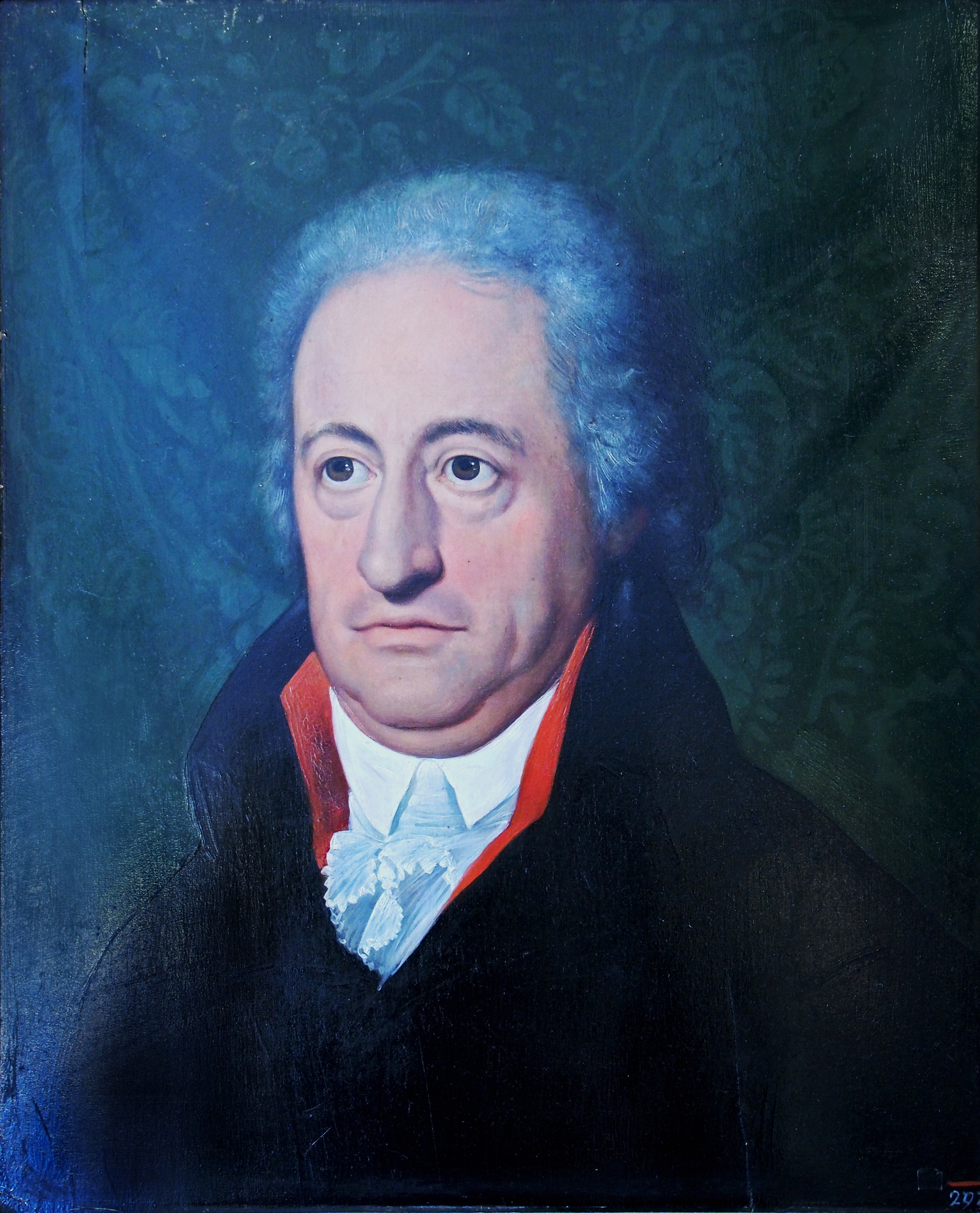
Portrait of Johann Wolfgang von Goethe by Ferdinand Jagemann, 1806

Goethe was a freethinker who believed that one could be inwardly Christian without following any of the Christian churches, many of whose central teachings he firmly opposed, sharply distinguishing between Jesus and the tenets of Christian theology and criticizing its history as a "hodgepodge of mistakes and violence". His own descriptions of his relationship to the Christian faith and even to the Church varied widely and have been interpreted even more widely, so that while Goethe's secretary Eckermann portrayed him as enthusiastic about Christianity, Jesus, Martin Luther, and the Protestant Reformation, even calling Christianity the "ultimate religion", on one occasion Goethe described himself as "not anti-Christian, nor un-Christian, but most decidedly non-Christian," and in his Venetian Epigram 66, Goethe listed the symbol of the cross among the four things that he most disliked. According to Nietzsche, Goethe had "a kind of almost joyous and trusting fatalism" that has "faith that only in the totality everything redeems itself and appears good and justified."

Born into a Lutheran family, Goethe's early faith was shaken by news of such events as the 1755 Lisbon earthquake and the Seven Years' War. A year before his death, in a letter to Sulpiz Boisserée, Goethe wrote that he had the feeling that all his life he had been aspiring to qualify as one of the Hypsistarians, an ancient sect of the Black Sea region who, in his understanding, sought to reverence, as being close to the Godhead, what came to their knowledge of the best and most perfect. Goethe's unorthodox religious beliefs led him to be called "the great heathen" and provoked distrust among the authorities of his time, who opposed the creation of a Goethe monument on account of his offensive religious creed. August Wilhelm Schlegel considered Goethe "a heathen who converted to Islam."

Goethe showed interest in other religions, including Islam, although Karic suggests that attempts to claim Goethe for any religion "is a pointless, Sisyphean task". At age 23, Goethe wrote a poem about a river, originally part of a dramatic dialogue, which he published as a separate work called Mahomets Gesang ("Muhammad's Song"). The poem's depiction of nature and forces within it is consonant with his Sturm und Drang years. In 1819, he published his West–östlicher Divan to ignite a poetic dialogue between East and West.

Politically, Goethe described himself as a "moderate liberal". He was critical of the radicalism of Jeremy Bentham and expressed sympathy for the liberalism of François Guizot. At the time of the French Revolution, he thought the enthusiasm of the students and professors to be a perversion of their energy and remained skeptical of the ability of the masses to govern. Goethe sympathized with the American Revolution and later wrote a poem in which he declared, "America, you're better off than our continent, the old." He did not join in the anti-Napoleonic mood of 1812, and he distrusted the strident nationalism which started to be expressed. The medievalism of the Heidelberg Romantics was also repellent to Goethe's eighteenth-century ideal of a supra-national culture.

Goethe was a Freemason, joining the lodge Amalia in Weimar in 1780, and frequently alluded to Masonic themes of universal brotherhood in his work. He was also attracted to the Illuminati, a Bavarian secret society founded on 1 May 1776.

Although often requested to write poems arousing nationalist passions, Goethe would always decline. In old age, he explained why this was so to Eckermann:

How could I write songs of hatred when I felt no hate? And, between ourselves, I never hated the French, although I thanked God when we were rid of them. How could I, to whom the only significant things are civilization [Kultur] and barbarism, hate a nation which is among the most cultivated in the world, and to which I owe a great part of my own culture? In any case, this business of hatred between nations is a curious thing. You will always find it more powerful and barbarous on the lowest levels of civilization. But there exists a level at which it wholly disappears, and where one stands, so to speak, above the nations, and feels the weal or woe of a neighbouring people as though it were one's own.

== Influence ==
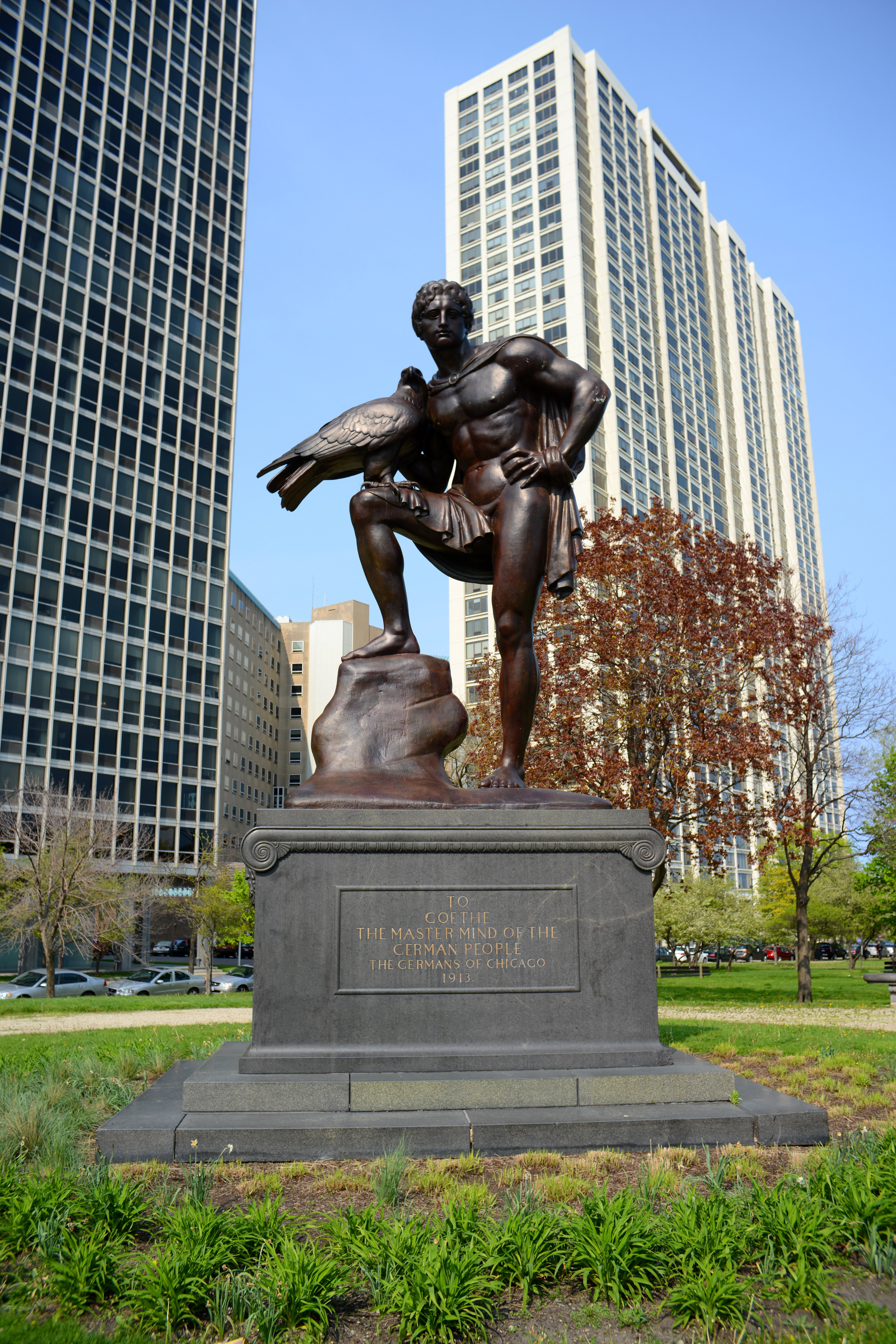
Statue dedicated "To Goethe the Mastermind of the German People" in Chicago's Lincoln Park (1913)

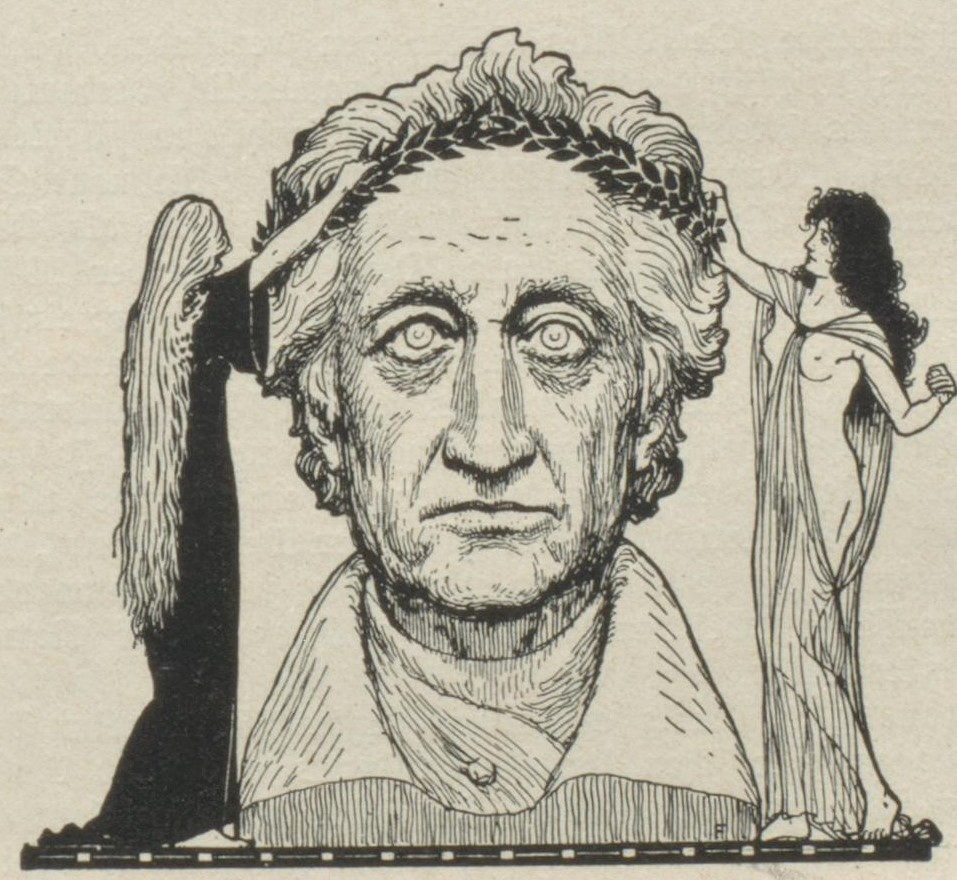
Illustration of Goethe as a classical poet by Fidus (1901)

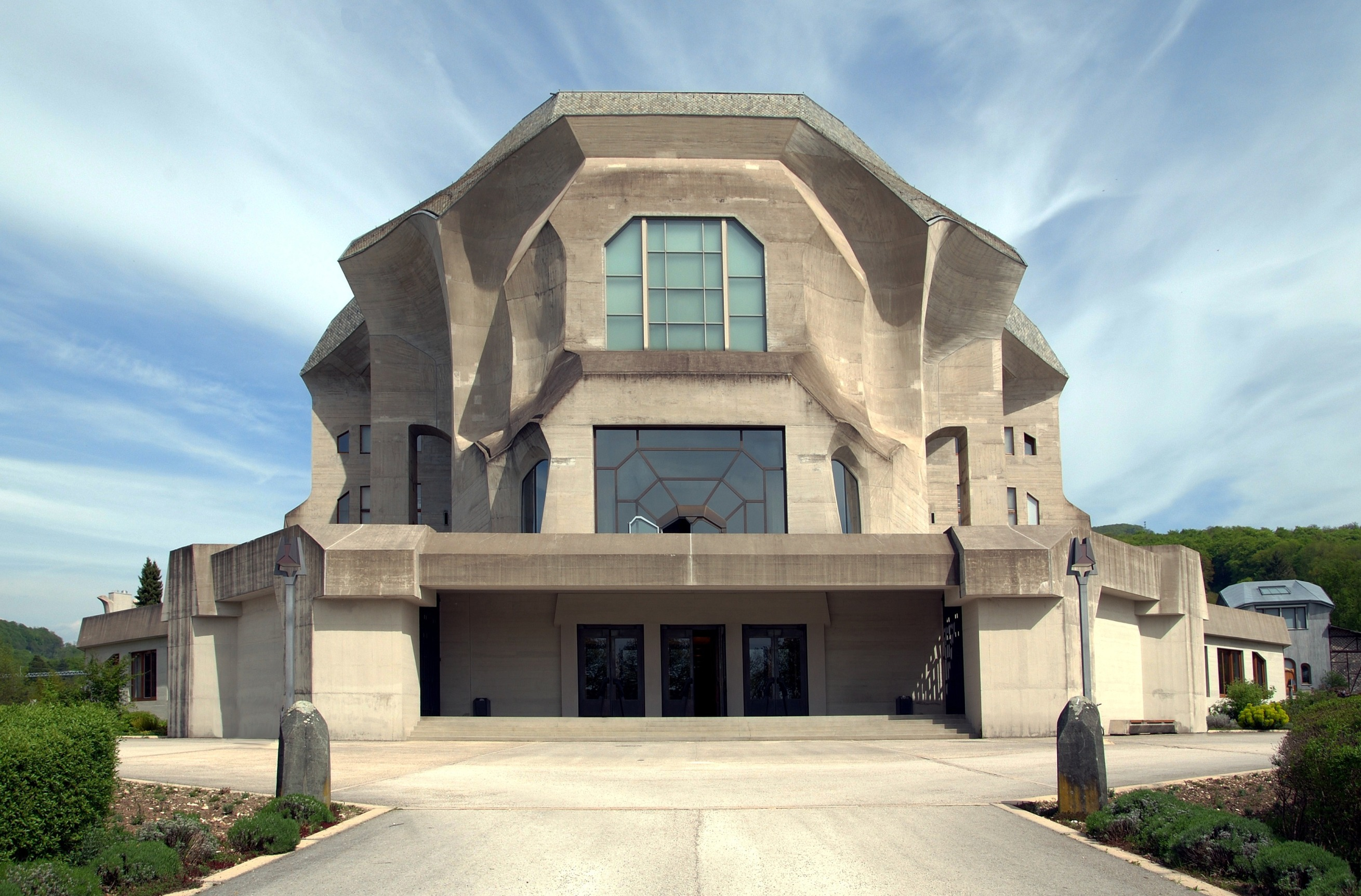
Second Goetheanum

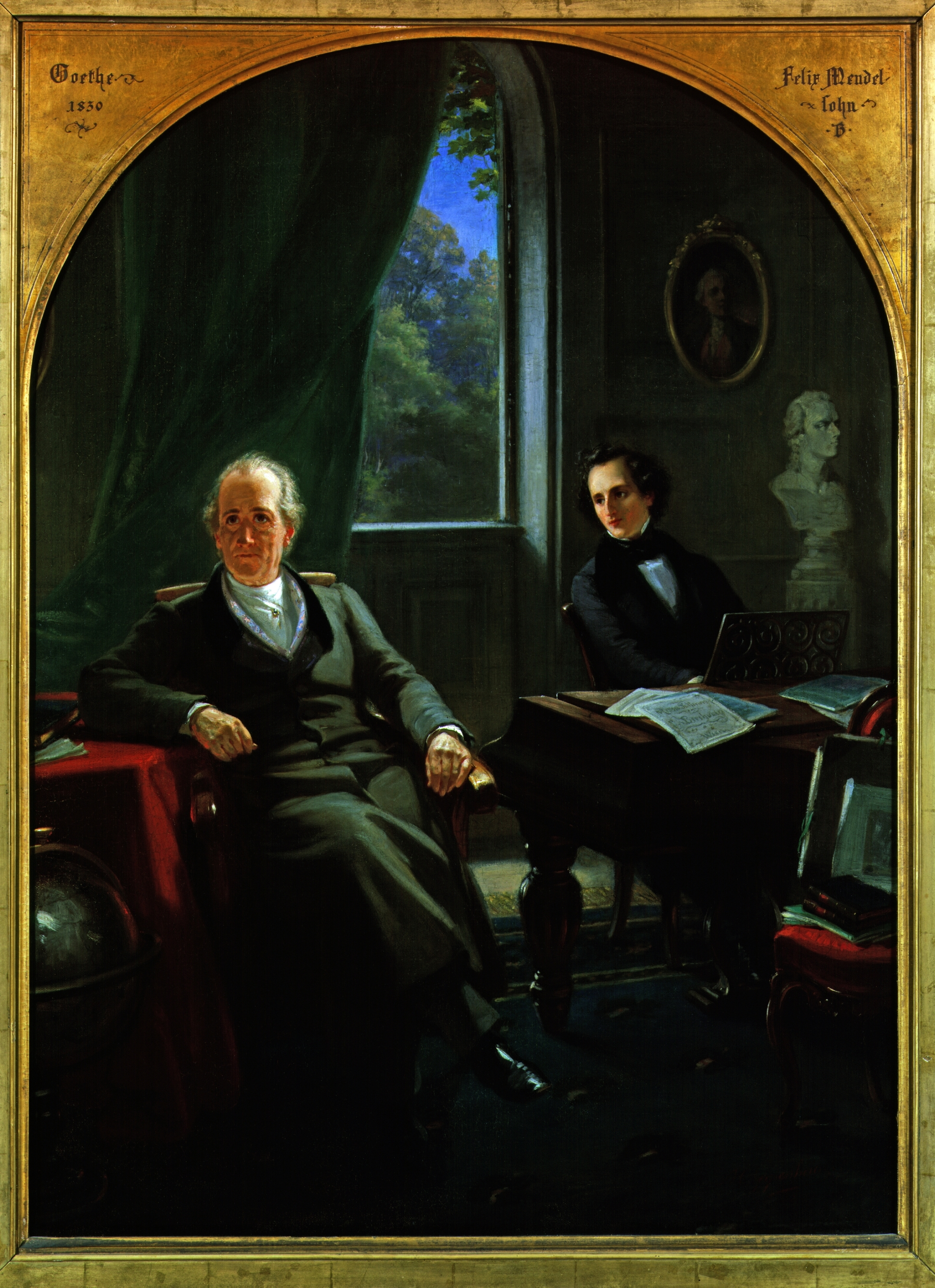
Mendelssohn plays to Goethe, 1830: painting by Moritz Oppenheim, 1864

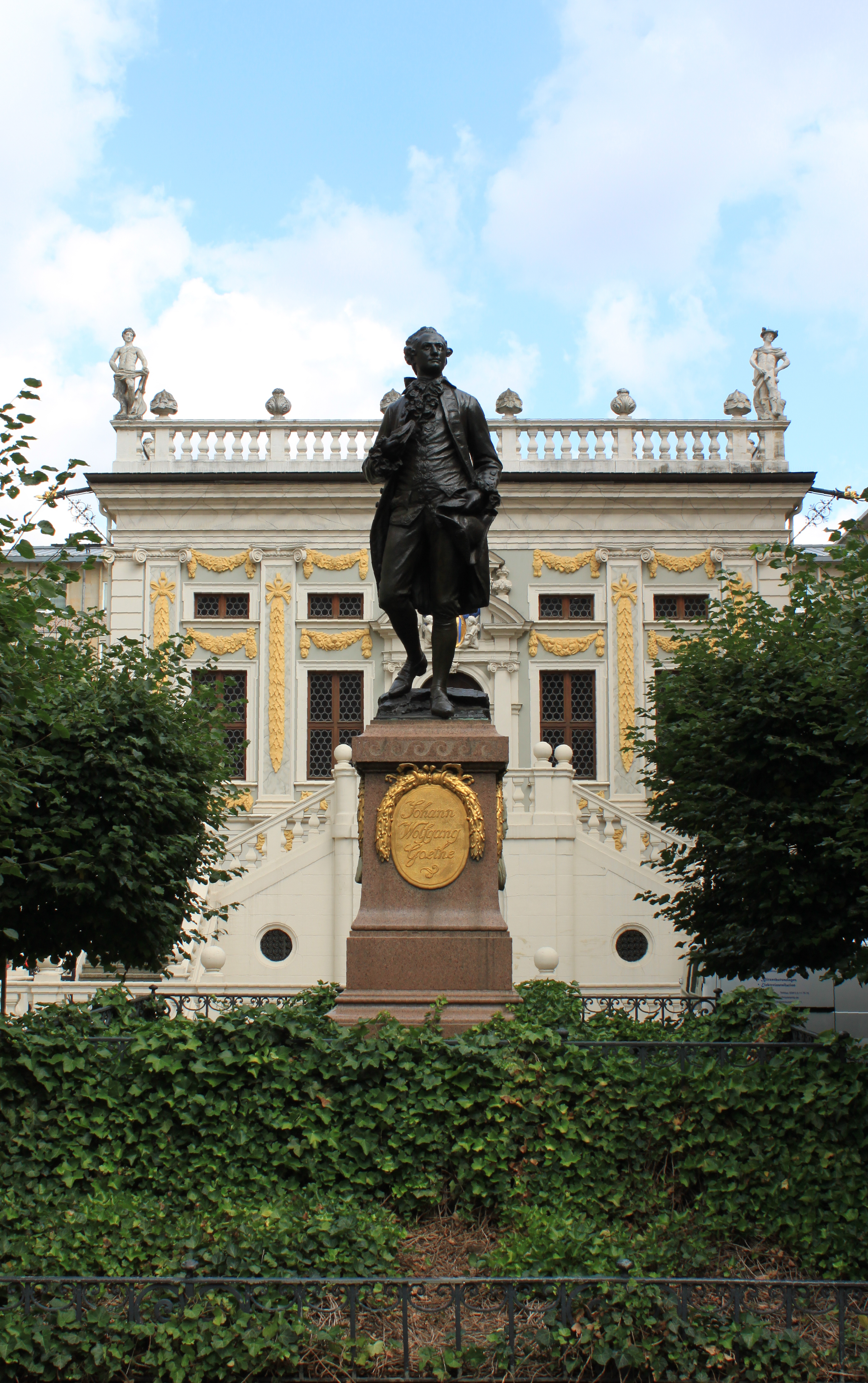
Goethe memorial in front of the Alte Handelsbörse, Leipzig

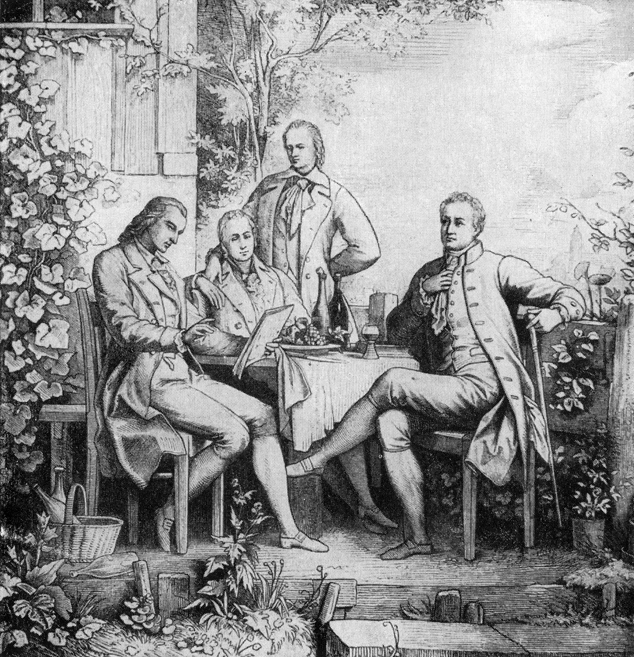
Schiller, Alexander and Wilhelm von Humboldt, and Goethe in Jena, c. 1797

In a letter written to Leopold Casper in 1932, Einstein wrote that he admired Goethe as "a poet without peer, and as one of the smartest and wisest men of all time". He goes on to say, "even his scholarly ideas deserve to be held in high esteem, and his faults are those of any great man".

Goethe had a breadth of influence on the nineteenth century and on ideas which have now become widespread. He produced volumes of poetry, essays, criticism, a theory of colours and early work on evolution and linguistics. He was fascinated by mineralogy, and the mineral goethite (iron oxide) is named after him. His non-fiction writings, most of which are philosophic and aphoristic in nature, spurred the development of many thinkers, including Georg Wilhelm Friedrich Hegel, Arthur Schopenhauer, Søren Kierkegaard, Friedrich Nietzsche, Ernst Cassirer, and Carl Jung. Along with Schiller, he was one of the leading figures of Weimar Classicism. Schopenhauer cited Goethe's novel Wilhelm Meister's Apprenticeship as one of the four greatest novels ever written, along with Tristram Shandy, La Nouvelle Héloïse and Don Quixote. Nietzsche wrote, "Four pairs it was that did not deny themselves to my sacrifice: Epicurus and Montaigne, Goethe and Spinoza, Plato and Rousseau, Pascal and Schopenhauer. With these I must come to terms when I have long wandered alone; they may call me right and wrong; to them will I listen when in the process they call each other right and wrong."

Goethe's poetry was set to music by almost every major Austrian and German composer from Mozart to Mahler, and his influence would spread to French drama and opera as well. Beethoven declared that a "Faust" Symphony would be the greatest thing for art. Liszt and Mahler both created symphonies in whole or in large part inspired by this seminal work, which would give the 19th century one of its most paradigmatic figures: Doctor Faustus.

Goethe was also a cultural force. During his first meeting with Napoleon in 1808, the latter greeted him with a famous remark, variously reported as "Vous êtes un homme!" ("You are a man!") or "Voilà, un homme!" ("Now there's a man!"). The two discussed politics, the writings of Voltaire, and Goethe's Sorrows of Young Werther, which Napoleon had read seven times and ranked among his favorites. Goethe came away from the meeting deeply impressed with Napoleon's enlightened intellect and his efforts to build an alternative to the corrupt old regime. Goethe always spoke of Napoleon with the greatest respect, confessing that "nothing higher and more pleasing could have happened to me in all my life" than to have met Napoleon in person. Goethe would receive the Légion d'honneur from Napoleon himself on 14 October 1808. He was also awarded the Order of Saint Anna by emperor Alexander.

Germaine de Staël, in De l'Allemagne (1813), presented German Classicism and Romanticism as a potential source of spiritual authority for Europe, and identified Goethe as a living classic. She praised Goethe as possessing "the chief characteristics of the German genius" and uniting "all that distinguishes the German mind." Staël's portrayal helped elevate Goethe over his more famous German contemporaries and transformed him into a European cultural hero. Goethe met with her and her partner Benjamin Constant, with whom he shared a mutual admiration.

In Victorian England, Goethe's noted disciple was Thomas Carlyle, who wrote the essays "Faustus" (1822), "Goethe's Helena" (1828), "Goethe" (1828), "Goethe's Works" (1832), "Goethe's Portrait" (1832), and "Death of Goethe" (1832) which introduced Goethe to English readers; translated Wilhelm Meister's Apprenticeship (1824) and Travels (1826), "Faust's Curse" (1830), "The Tale" (1832), "Novelle" (1832) and "Symbolum" at a time when few read German; and with whom Goethe corresponded. Goethe exerted a profound influence on George Eliot, whose partner George Henry Lewes wrote a Life of Goethe (dedicated to Carlyle). Eliot presented Goethe as "eminently the man who helps us to rise to a lofty point of observation" and praised his "large tolerance", which "quietly follows the stream of fact and of life" without passing moral judgments. Matthew Arnold found in Goethe the "Physician of the Iron Age" and "the clearest, the largest, the most helpful thinker of modern times" with a "large, liberal view of life".

Goethe's reputation had a significant effect on the choice of Weimar in 1919 as the venue for the national assembly, convened to draft a new constitution for what would become the Weimar Republic. Goethe became a key reference for Thomas Mann in his speeches and essays defending the republic. He emphasized Goethe's "cultural and self-developing individualism", humanism, and cosmopolitanism.

The literary estate of Goethe in the Goethe and Schiller Archives was inscribed on UNESCO's Memory of the World international register in 2001 in recognition of its historical significance.

George Henry Lewes celebrated Goethe's revolutionary understanding of the organism.

Thinkers such as Ralph Waldo Emerson would take up many similar ideas in the 1800s. Goethe's ideas on evolution would frame the question that Darwin and Wallace would approach within the scientific paradigm. The Serbian inventor and electrical engineer Nikola Tesla was heavily influenced by Goethe's Faust, his favourite poem, and had actually memorized the entire text. It was while reciting a certain verse that he was struck with the epiphany that would lead to the idea of the rotating magnetic field and ultimately, alternating current.

=== Institutions ===
- The public university in the city of Frankfurt am Main was named after Goethe, the Goethe University.
- The Federal Republic of Germany's cultural institution, the Goethe-Institut, is named after him, and promotes the study of German abroad and fosters knowledge about Germany by providing information on its culture, society and politics.
- Followers of the twentieth century esotericist Rudolf Steiner built a theatre named the Goetheanum after him — where festival performances of Faust are still performed.

=== Depictions in art and media ===
Robert Walser wrote a historical fiction short story about Goethe, "Something About Goethe" (1921), published in Pro Helvetia. The piece is included in the English language collection Speaking to the Rose.

10 DM 1999 Goethe

In 1999, to commemorate the 250th anniversary of Goethe's birth and Weimar's designation as European Capital of Culture, the Federal Republic of Germany issued a silver 10 Deutsche Mark commemorative coin designed by František Chochola. The obverse features a youthful bust of Goethe adapted from a 1775 relief by Johann Peter Melchior, alongside the names of prominent cultural figures associated with Weimar, while the smooth edge bears the incuse inscription "WIRKE GUT SO WIRKST DU LÄNGER" ("Do good, so your work endures longer"), quoted from his poetry.

== Books related to Goethe ==
- Biermann, Berthold (ed.).Goethe's World: As Seen in Letters and Memoirs;
- Boyle, Nicholas. Goethe: The Poet and the Age (2 vols.);
- Brandes, Georg. Wolfgang Goethe. New York: Crown Publishers, 1936;
- Eckermann, Johann Peter. Conversations with Goethe;
- Eissler, Kurt R.. Goethe: A Psychoanalytic Study;
- Friedenthal, Richard. Goethe: His Life and Times;
- Goethe-Wörterbuch (Goethe Dictionary, abbreviated GWb). Stuttgart. Kohlhammer Verlag. ISBN 978-3-17-019121-1;
- Hammer, Carl Jr. Goethe and Rousseau: Resonances of their Mind.
- Holm-Hadulla, Rainer Matthias. Goethe's Path to Creativity: A Psycho-Biography of the Eminent Politician, Scientist and Poet, New York: Routledge, 2019. ISBN 9780429459535;
- Lewes, George Henry. The Life of Goethe;
- Ludwig, Emil. Goethe: The History of a Man;
- Mann, Thomas. Lotte in Weimar: The Beloved Returns;
- Nicholls, Angus. Goethe's Concept of the Daemonic: After the Ancients;
- Pagel, Louis. Doctor Faustus of the Popular Legend: Marlowe, the Puppet-Play, Goethe, and Lenau: Treated Historically and Critically: a Parallel between Goethe and Schiller: an Historic Outline of German Literature. 1883;
- Reed, T. J.. Goethe;
- Schweitzer, Albert. Goethe: Four Studies;
- Unseld, Siegfried. Goethe and his Publishers;
- Wilkinson, E. M. and L. A. Willoughby. Goethe, Poet and Thinker;
- Williams, John. The Life of Goethe. A Critical Biography.

== See also ==
- Young Goethe in Love (2010)
- Dora Stock – her encounters with the 16-year-old Goethe.
- Goethe Basin, a large crater on the planet Mercury
- Johann-Wolfgang-von-Goethe-Gymnasium
- W. H. Murray – author of misattributed quotation "Until one is committed ..."
- "Nature", essay often misattributed to Goethe
- Goethe University

Awards named after him

- Goethe Awards
- Goethe Prize
- Goethe Medal
- Hanseatic Goethe Prize

== Bibliography ==
- Mercer-Taylor, Peter (2000). The Life of Mendelssohn. Cambridge, England: Cambridge University Press. ISBN 978-0-521-63972-9.
- Todd, R. Larry (2003). Mendelssohn – A Life in Music. Oxford: Oxford University Press. ISBN 978-0-19-511043-2.
- Unseld, Siegfried (1996). Goethe and His Publishers. University of Chicago Press. ISBN 9780226841908.
