= Johann Peter Eckermann =

German tutor, poet and author (1792–1854)

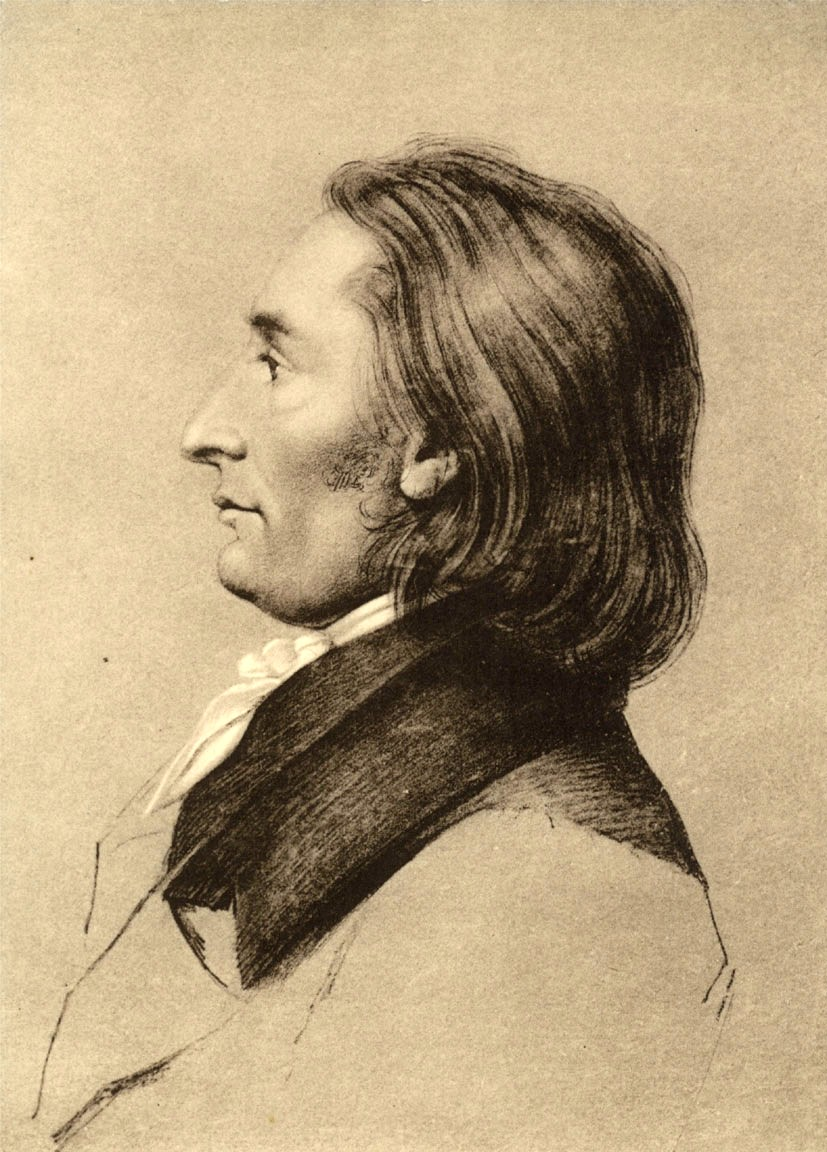
- Born: 21 September 1792; Winsen (Luhe), Harburg
- Died: 3 December 1854 (aged 62); Weimar
- Occupations: poet, author
- Known for: association with Johann Wolfgang von Goethe
- Notable work: Conversations with Goethe

Johann Peter Eckermann (21 September 1792 – 3 December 1854), German poet and writer, is best known for his work Conversations with Goethe, the fruit of his association with Johann Wolfgang von Goethe during the last years of Goethe's life.

== Biography ==
Eckermann was born at Winsen (Luhe) in Harburg, Holy Roman Empire. According to an unfinished draft for an autobiography, Eckermann's father had once owned a small business, but lost it, and took up work as a peddler; Eckermann helped him carry his goods, and remembered being very happy at this time. He did not learn to read or write until he was fourteen years old.

In the same draft, Eckermann recalls experiencing an "irrepressible drive to copy" when, as a small child, he noticed a horse designed on a packet of tobacco; he drew the horse, and feeling that "my imitation was completely like the model [...] I enjoyed a happiness hitherto unknown to me." From then on, he writes, "the drive towards sensuous reproduction, once awakened, never left me."

After serving as a volunteer in the War of Liberation (1813–1814), Eckermann obtained a secretarial appointment under the war department at Hanover. In 1817, although twenty-five years of age, he was enabled to attend the Gymnasium of Hanover and afterwards the University of Göttingen, which, however, after one year's residence as a student of law, he left in 1822.

His acquaintance with Goethe began in the following year when Eckermann sent to Goethe the manuscript of Beiträge zur Poesie (1823). Soon afterwards he went to Weimar, where he supported himself as a private tutor. For several years he also instructed the son of the grand duke. In 1830 he travelled in Italy with Goethe's son. In 1838 he was given the title of grand-ducal councillor and appointed librarian to the grand-duchess.

The idea for the Conversations was suggested to Eckermann in 1828 by a letter given to Goethe for his birthday, where a woman who had dined with the deceased Friedrich Schiller had undertaken at the time to write down Schiller's words.

== Writings ==
Eckermann is chiefly remembered for his important contributions to the knowledge of the great poet contained in his Conversations with Goethe (1836–1848). To Eckermann Goethe entrusted the publication of his Nachgelassene Schriften (posthumous works) (1832–1833). He was also joint-editor with Friedrich Wilhelm Riemer (1774–1845) of the complete edition of Goethe's works in 40 volumes (1839–1840). He died at Weimar on 3 December 1854.

Eckermann's Gespräche mit Goethe (vols: i. and ii. 1836; volume iii. 1848; 7th edition, Leipzig, 1899; best edition by Ludwig Geiger, Leipzig, 1902) have been translated into almost all the European languages, (English translations by Margaret Fuller, Boston, 1839; Allan Blunden, 2022; and John Oxenford, London, 1850).

Besides this work and the Beiträge zur Poesie, Eckermann published a volume of poems (Gedichte, 1838. See J. P. Eckermanns Nachlaß edited by Friedrich Tewes, volume i. (1905), and an article by RM Meyer in the Goethe-Jahrbuch, xvii. (1896)).

== Legacy ==
Avital Ronell's Dictations: On Haunted Writing (1993) deploys psychoanalytic techniques to examine Goethe's "literary parasitism" of Eckermann, arguing that the phantasm of Goethe evoked by Eckermann takes over authorship of the Conversations and brings about the "forgetting" of Eckermann.
