= Nature (Tobler essay) =

Essay by Georg Christoph Tobler

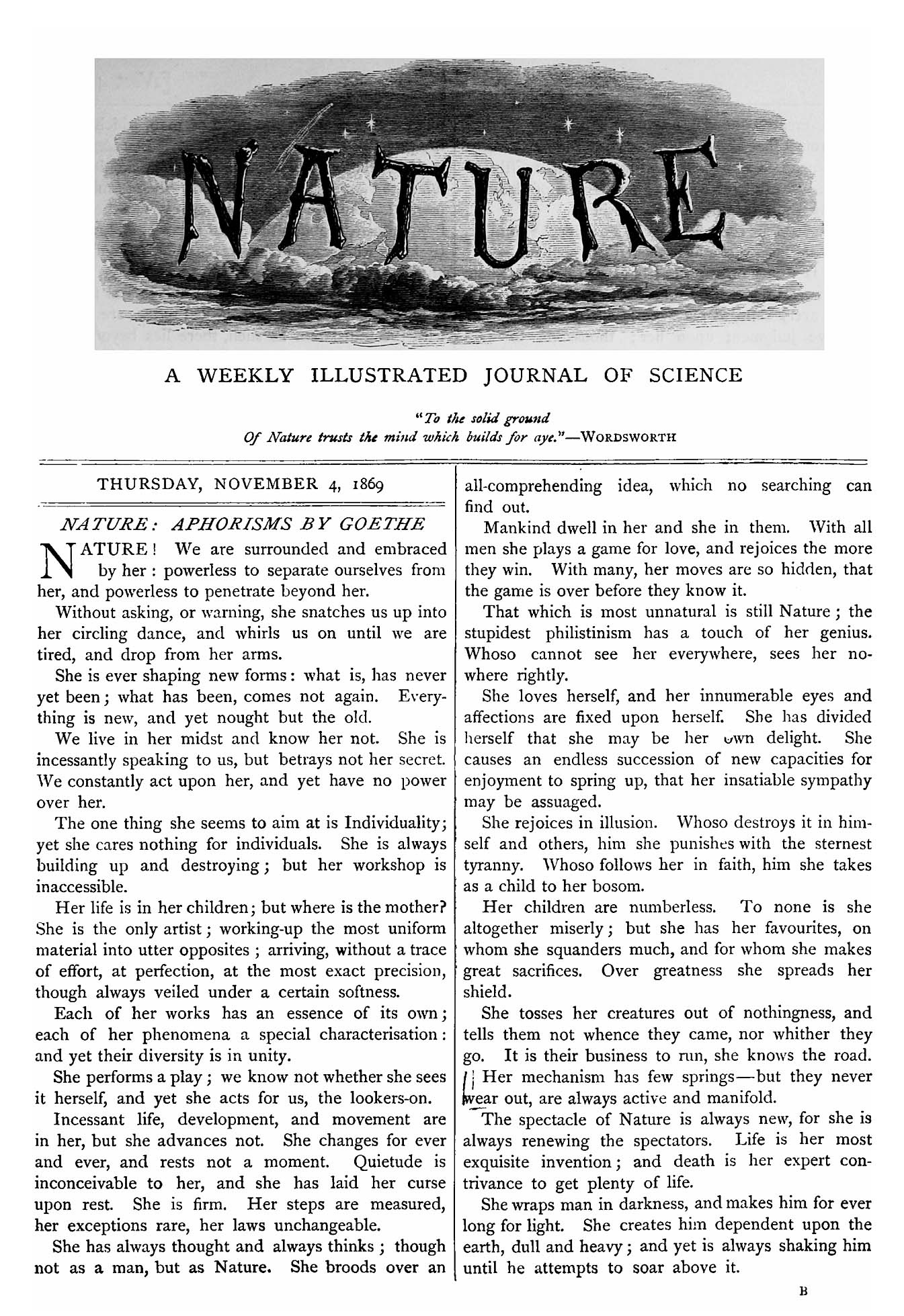
The first issue of Nature, in which the essay is incorrectly attributed to Goethe

"Nature" (German: Die Natur) is an essay by Georg Christoph Tobler which is often incorrectly attributed to Johann Wolfgang von Goethe. It was first published in 1783 in the Tiefurt Journal. Tobler wrote the essay after repeated conversations with Goethe.

The essay begins:

Nature! We are surrounded and embraced by her—unable to step out of her and unable to penetrate her more deeply.

In the first issue of Nature magazine, published on Nov 4, 1869, T. H. Huxley submitted an English translation of the essay, titled "Nature: Aphorisms by Goethe".

Sigmund Freud wrote that a public recitation of the essay, which Freud refers to as "the incomparably beautiful essay by Goethe", led him to study medicine.
