= The Natural Daughter =

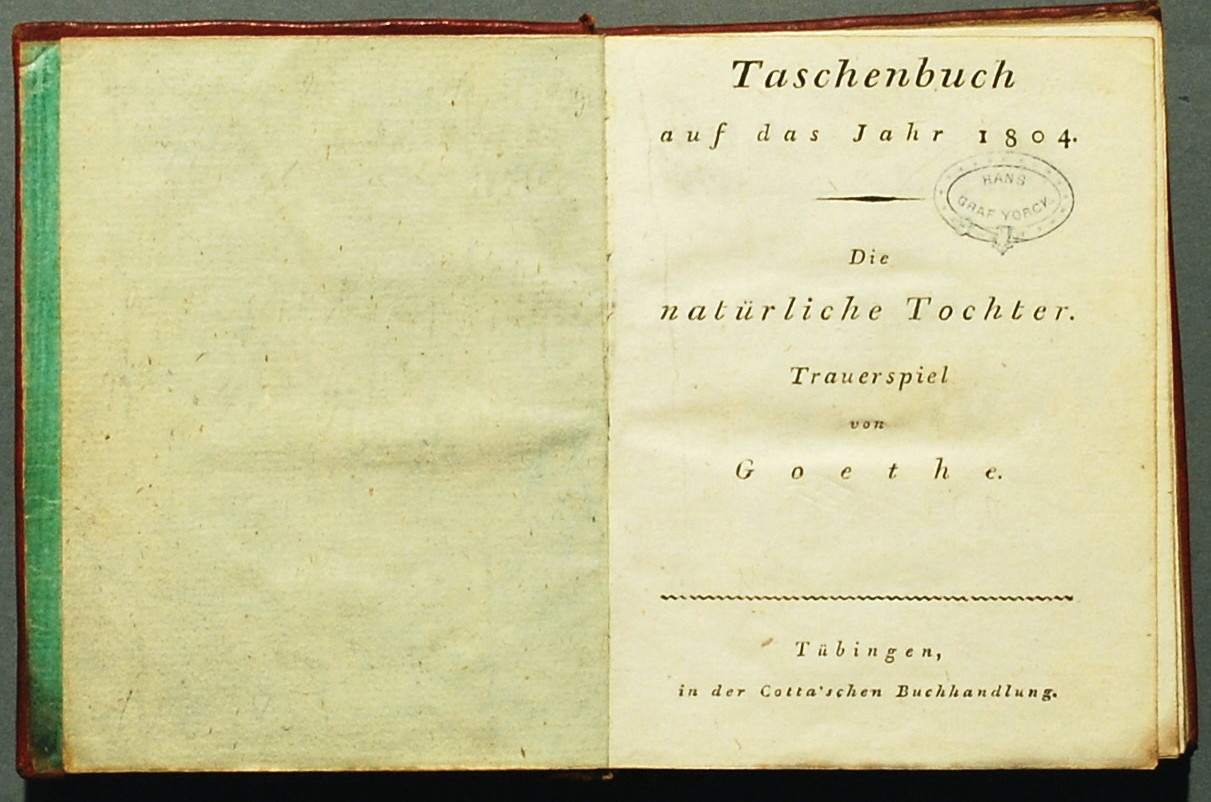
Title page from the first edition

The Natural Daughter is the last of Goethe's three verse dramas in the classical style, after Iphigenia and Torquato Tasso. Drawing on the real story of a young woman caught up in the French Revolution, it explores the impact of uncontrollable events on ordinary people's lives. Its present obscurity is partly due to its apparently unfinished state: Goethe planned a second part, which he never wrote. But in its focus on the main character Eugenia ("well-born"), like the Revolution itself a product of the Enlightenment, the play examines the interaction between natural integrity and social compromise.

The play was first performed on 2 April 1803 in Weimar.

== Synopsis ==
Act I – Forest

Beautiful, talented and well-connected as the Duke's daughter, Eugenia has every prospect of a glittering career – except that she is illegitimate. A riding accident in the countryside brings her face to face with the King, who offers to recognise her formally at court in return for her father's support against a rumoured republican conspiracy. Despite the prospect of political turmoil the Duke and his daughter seem confident of a future full of promise.

Act II – Eugenia's room, in the Gothic style

A day or two later. The prospect of Eugenia's recognition threatens the conspiracy's success. So the conspirators, who include the Duke's own Secretary and his former lover, Eugenia's Governess, plot to do away with Eugenia altogether. Ignoring the Governess's veiled warnings, Eugenia prepares eagerly for her presentation at court; she writes a sonnet pledging loyalty to the King, and gives way to the temptation to try on the dress and jewellery the Duke has provided for the occasion.

Act III – The Duke's antechamber, in the modern style

Some time later. The Duke's household is dark and silent, mourning for the sudden loss of Eugenia. We learn that she has been abducted by the fanatical Cleric, who like the Governess is at the mercy of the Secretary's ruthless powers. In response to the Cleric's gory account of Eugenia's death, the Duke resolves to preserve her memory by converting his misery and anger into revolutionary action.

Act IV – Harbour square

Eugenia, disguised in a veil, and the Governess gloomily await their enforced embarkation into exile, to a disease-ridden island from which few return. Their lives are controlled by orders set out in a mysterious letter. The Governess and the young and idealistic Advocate try to convince Eugenia that an arranged marriage is her only path of escape from banishment. But Eugenia, confident of her popularity with the people, refuses to listen.

Act V – Harbour square

Having failed to secure popular support Eugenia appeals in turn to the garrison Commandant and the Abbess for protection. Though initially sympathetic, on seeing the letter they turn away, advising her to accept her fate. Eugenia discovers that the letter appears to be signed by the King, and attempts suicide; her rescue by the Monk, whose apocalyptic vision predicts the downfall of civilisation, persuades her that altruism on her home ground, in the faint hope of a chance to revive her country's fortunes, is preferable to exile. She finally accepts the Advocate's proposal and commands him to lead them 'to the altar'.
