= Euphorion =

Euphorion may refer to:

- Euphorion (playwright) (fifth century BC), Attic tragic playwright and son of Aeschylus
- Euphorion of Chalcis (born c. 275 BC), Greek poet and grammarian
- Euphorion (mythology), son of Achilles and Helen of Troy
- Euphorion, a character in Goethe's Faust, Part 2, the offspring of Faust and Helen of Troy
- Euphorion (journal), a German-language academic journal of literary studies
- Euphorion Books, a publishing company formed by Diana Mosley and her husband, Sir Oswald Mosley, publisher of The European (1953 magazine)
