= Gespräche mit Goethe =

1836 book by Johann Peter Eckermann

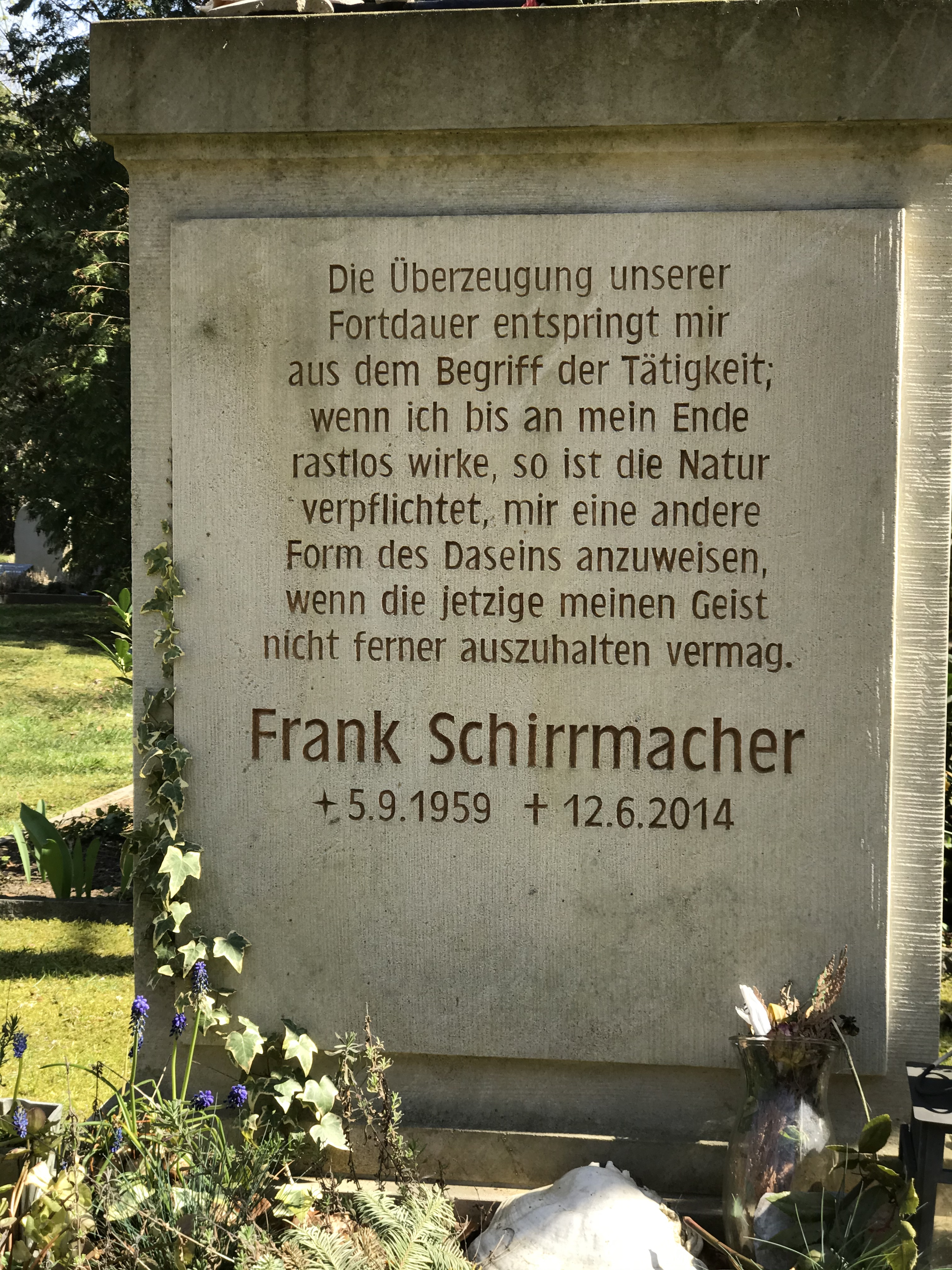
Quote on Frank Schirrmacher's tombstone

Gespräche mit Goethe (translation: Conversations with Goethe, Conversations with Eckermann) is a book by Johann Peter Eckermann recording his conversations with Johann Wolfgang von Goethe during the last nine years of the latter's life, while Eckermann served as Goethe's personal secretary. It was first released (in two volumes) in 1836 and substantially augmented (with the addition of another volume) in 1848.

Eckermann published the book at a time when Goethe's popularity was diminishing in Germany, and the book initially sold poorly there. It rapidly became very popular among international readers and subsequently played an important role in reviving interest in and appreciation of Goethe's work both in Germany and around the world.

Some editions go so far as to publish the book as Conversations with Eckermann, with Goethe listed as the author. This practice mistakenly implies Eckermann played a role of editor rather than author; on the contrary, the book is very frank about its point of view. Eckermann includes much autobiographical material and clearly states that his "conversations" are not word-for-word transcriptions, but reconstructions based on memory.

== Samples ==
November 24, 1824. I went to see Goethe this evening, before going to the theatre, and found him well and cheerful. . . . I told him that I proposed reading with Mr. Doolan the German translation of Plutarch. This led us to speak of Roman and Grecian history. Goethe said, "The Roman history does not suit our present turn of mind. We take a more general interest in humanity, and cannot sympathize with the triumphs of Caesar. Neither are we much edified by the history of Greece. When the whole people united against a foreign foe, then, indeed, is their history great and glorious; but the division of the states, and their eternal wars with one another, where Greek fights against Greek, are insufferable. Besides, the history of our own time is so full of important events, the battles of Leipsic and Waterloo so grand, that Marathon and other such days are entirely eclipsed. Neither are our great men inferior to theirs. Wellington, Blucher, and the French Marshals vie with any of the heroes of antiquity."

Sunday, March 11, 1832 "We scarcely know," continued Goethe, “what we owe to Luther, and the Reformation in general. We are freed from the fetters of spiritual narrow-mindedness; we have, in consequence of our increasing culture, become capable of turning back to the fountain head, and of comprehending Christianity in its purity. We have, again, the courage to stand with firm feet upon God's earth, and to feel ourselves in our divinely-endowed human nature. Let mental culture go on advancing, let the natural sciences go on gaining in depth and breadth, and the human mind expand as it may, it will never go beyond the elevation and moral culture of Christianity as it glistens and shines forth in the gospel!"

== Translations and influence ==
Margaret Fuller translated the first volume into English in 1839 to great acclaim, though a later translator, John Oxenford, complained that "the frequent omissions render it almost an abridgement." Subsequent translators, however, have taken great liberty with Eckermann's work, greatly reducing the autobiographical material and substantially altering his prose, rather than offering faithful renderings in English.

Friedrich Nietzsche called it "the best German book there is [dem besten deutschen Buche, das es gibt]." It is frequently compared to Boswell's Life of Johnson. Jorge Luis Borges thinks that the two books are "in no way comparable", because Boswell's lively character is vital to his book, whereas

Eckermann was a man of limited intelligence who greatly revered Goethe, who spoke with him ex cathedra. Eckermann very rarely dared to contradict Goethe. The book has something of catechism about it. Eckermann almost doesn’t exist except as a kind of machine that records Goethe’s words. We know nothing about Eckermann, nothing about his character.
