= Roman Elegies =

Poems by Johann W. v. Goethe

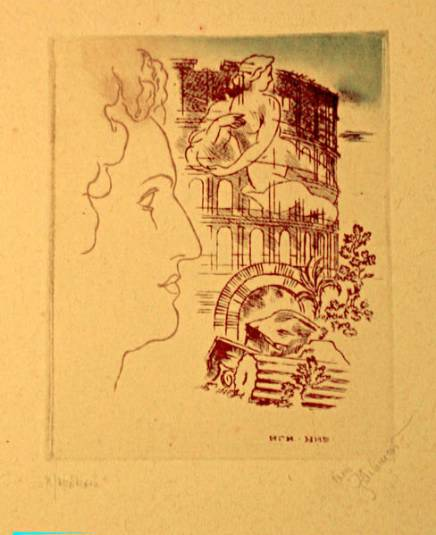
Soviet illustration by Ignatiy Nivinskiy, 1933

The Roman Elegies (originally published under the title Erotica Romana in Germany, later Römische Elegien) is a cycle of twenty-four poems by Johann Wolfgang von Goethe.

They reflect Goethe's Italian Journey from 1786 to 1788 and celebrate the sensuality and vigour of Italian and Classical culture. Written mainly after his return to Weimar, they contain poems on many sexual themes, and four of them were suppressed from publication during Goethe's lifetime due to fears of censorship; they were only published in 1914, together with a large body of the Venetian Epigrams, written during his second, shorter travel to Italy in 1790. The elegies are also a loving tribute to Goethe's companion, Christiane Vulpius, whom he met in 1788 on his return from Italy.
