= Torquato Tasso (play) =

Verse play by Johann Wolfgang von Goethe

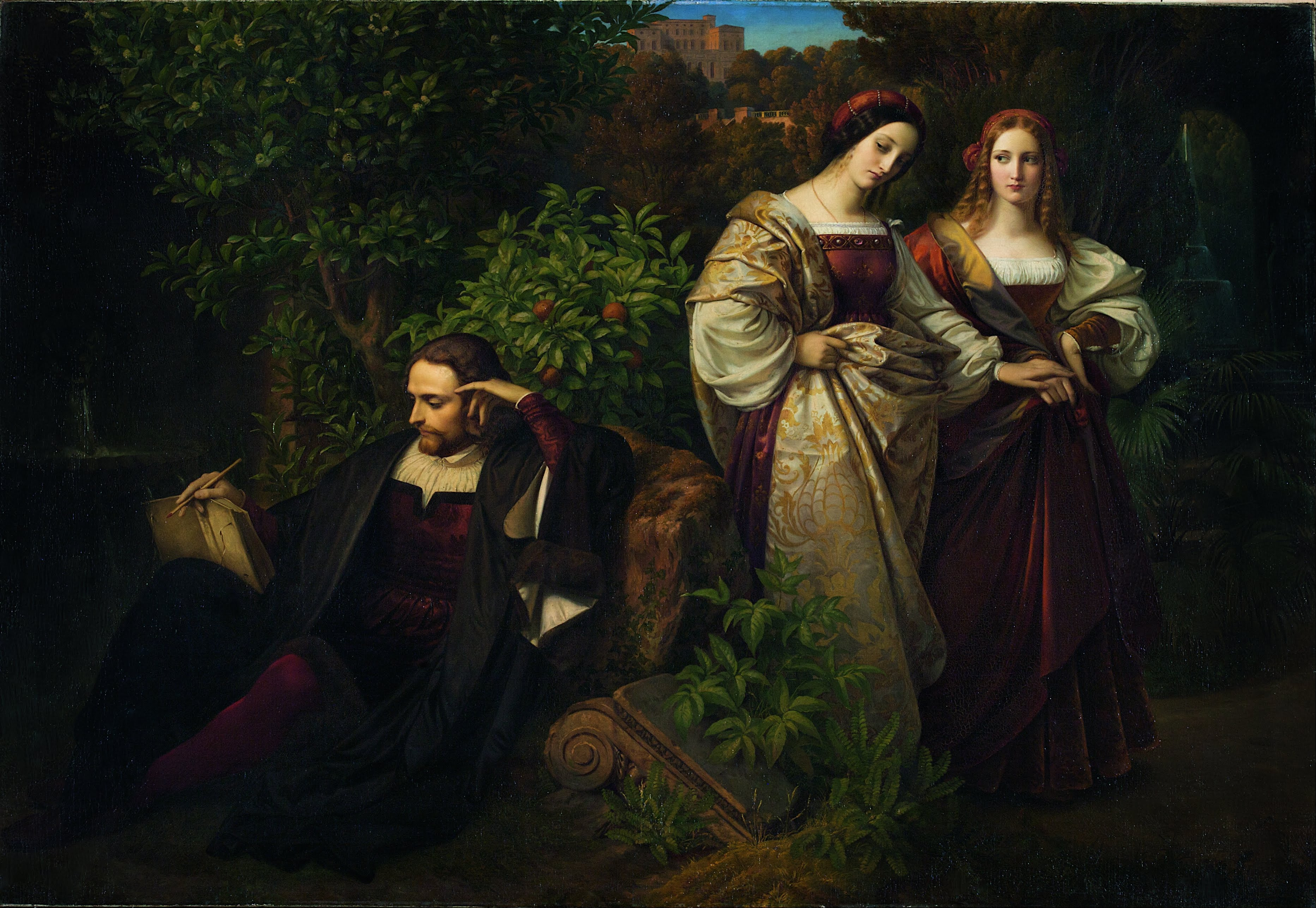
Torquato Tasso and the Two Leonores, by Karl Ferdinand Sohn

Torquato Tasso is a play in verse by the German dramatist Johann Wolfgang Goethe about the sixteenth-century Italian poet and courtier Torquato Tasso and his descent into madness. The composition of the play began in Weimar in 1780 but most of it was written between 1786 and 1788, while Goethe was in Italy. He completed the play in 1790.
