= Schlosser =

Surname list

Schlosser is a German surname which can mean 'locksmith'. Notable people with the surname include:

- Art Paul Schlosser (born 1960), American artist and musician
- Cornelia Schlosser (1750–1777), German letter writer and sister of Johann Wolfgang von Goethe
- Dena Schlosser (born 1969), American murderer
- Eric Schlosser (born 1959), American journalist and writer
- Franz Schlosser (1888–1960), Austrian footballer
- Friedrich Christoph Schlosser (1776–1861), German historian
- Galen Schlosser (1912–2002), American architect
- Gary Schlosser, American film producer
- Gus Schlosser (born 1988), American baseball player
- Gustav Schlosser (born 1939), Swiss athlete
- Herbert Schlosser (1926–2021), American television executive
- Imre Schlosser (1889–1959), Hungarian footballer
- Johann Friedrich Heinrich Schlosser (1780–1851), German jurist, writer and translator
- Johann Georg Schlosser (1739–1799), German lawyer, historian, politician, translator and philosopher
- John F. Schlosser (1839–?), New York state senator
- Josip Schlosser (1801–1882), Croatian physician and botanist
- Julius von Schlosser (1866–1938), Austrian art historian
- Kurt Schlosser (1900–1944), German cabinet-maker, climber, and Communist
- Marcel Schlosser (born 1987), German footballer
- Max Schlosser (tenor) (1835–1916), German opera singer
- Max Schlosser (zoologist) (1854–1932), German zoologist and paleontologist
- Merle Schlosser (1926–1993), American football player and coach
- Peter Schlosser, German physicist, planetary scientist and academic administrator
- Pieter Schlosser (born 1980), Guatemalan American film and television composer
- Ralph Weist Schlosser, American academic and college president
- Roland Schlosser (born 1982), Austrian fencer
- Rudolf Schlosser (1880–1944), German pastor, social worker and Quaker
- Vera Schlosser (1929–2018), German operatic soprano

== See also ==
- Fort Schlosser, fortification built in New York state around 1760
- 58896 Schlosser, asteroid
- Schloss (surname)
