= Christiane Vulpius =

Mistress and wife of Goethe (1765–1816)

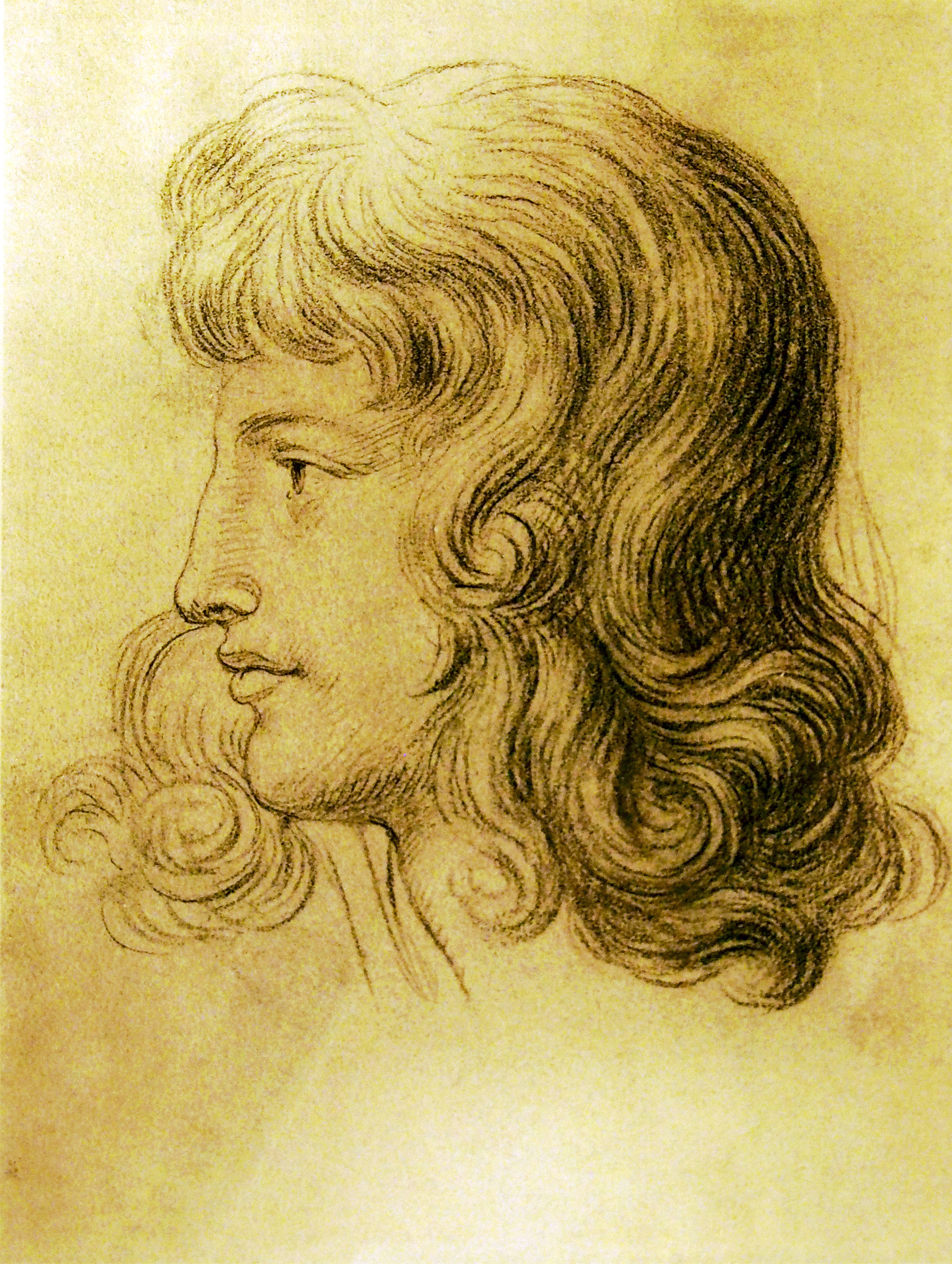
- Christiane Vulpius, drawn by Goethe, c. 1788–1789. Currently displayed at Goethe House, in the Innenstadt district of Frankfurt am Main.
- Born: Johanna Christiana Sophie Vulpius; 1 June 1765; Weimar, Grand Duchy of Saxe-Weimar-Eisenach
- Died: 6 June 1816 (aged 51); Weimar, Grand Duchy of Saxe-Weimar-Eisenach, German Confederation
- Burial place: Jacobsfriedhof, Weimar
- Spouse: Johann Wolfgang von Goethe (m. 1806)
- Children: 5 (4 died young), including August von Goethe
- Relatives: Christian August Vulpius (brother); Catharina Elisabeth Goethe (mother-in-law); Cornelia Schlosser (sister-in-law); Ottilie von Goethe (daughter-in-law); Walther von Goethe (grandson)

Johanna Christiana Sophie Vulpius von Goethe (1 June 1765 – 6 June 1816) was the longtime lover and later wife of Johann Wolfgang von Goethe.

== Biography ==
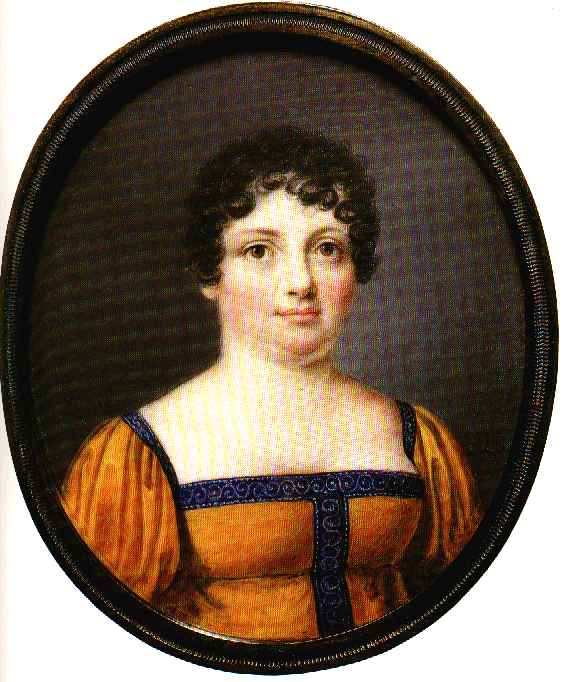
Christiane Vulpius

Vulpius spent her childhood in Luthergasse, one of the oldest parts of Weimar. Her paternal ancestors had been academics for several generations. On her mother's side, she came from a family of artisans. Her father, Johann Friedrich Vulpius (1725–1786), who worked as an archivist (i.e., file copyist) in Weimar, had studied law for a few semesters but then dropped out of college. His position was poorly paid, and the family lived in difficult circumstances with six children. Her father sacrificed everything to enable his eldest son, Christian August, to pursue his education, who would later become a writer of popular historical novels and plays.

After her father got fired from his job, Vulpius was forced to work as a maid. She was employed in a small Weimar cleaning workshop owned by Caroline Bertuch, in a house owned by her brother Friedrich Justin Bertuch, a well-known publisher and patron of the arts. Vulpius was not a regular worker but was one of the "idle middle-class girls" (unbeschäftigten Mädchen der mittleren Classen) employed there.

Through various requests for help, Johann Wolfgang von Goethe knew about the family's troubles. On 13 July 1788, the 39-year-old Goethe met the 23-year-old Vulpius in the Park an der Ilm, where she handed him a petition on behalf of her brother Christian August. Goethe later advocated several times for his future brother-in-law.

That summer, Goethe and Vulpius began a passionate love affair. Their happiness inspired Goethe to write his cheerful and erotic poems, beginning with the Roman Elegies — which reflect not only Goethe's Italian Journey from 1786 to 1788, but also his relationship with Vulpius — and ending with the poem "Found" (Once to the forest I went alone [...]).

On 25 December 1789, their first child, Julius August Walther von Goethe, was born. Four other children followed, all of whom died as infants: a son — either stillborn or dying immediately after birth — (14 October 1791); Caroline (born 24 November 1793, died 4 December 1793, aged 10 days); Carl (born 1 November 1795, died 18 November 1795, aged 17 days); and Catharina (born and died 18 December 1802).

The unmarried couple faced rejection on many fronts. The Weimar court and society (especially Bettina von Arnim-Brentano) dismissed the relationship as illegitimate and improper. At one point, Goethe had to leave his house — known as the "Frauenplan House" (Haus am Frauenplan) — in the center of Weimar and temporarily move to the Jägerhaus on Marienstraße because of the scandal.

In October 1806, Napoleon's victory at the Battle of Jena and Auerstedt hit Weimar hard. When the city was looted by French soldiers, the Frauenplan House was threatened. Vulpius courageously opposed the invading soldiers and was able to stop the looting until Goethe received official protection from the French commander. A few days later, on 19 October 1806, Goethe and Vulpius were finally married, in the sacristy of the Jakobskirche.

Even after her marriage, Vulpius was only reluctantly accepted by Weimar society as "secretary to Goethe." Attempting to break the ice, Goethe asked the wealthy widow Johanna Schopenhauer (mother of the philosopher Arthur Schopenhauer) to offer an official invitation to tea. She did so with the remark: If Goethe gives her his name, I suppose we can give her a cup of tea.

Vulpius's letters to her husband reveal her common sense as well as certain gaps in her education. Joyful, practical and energetic, she took care of the extensive household: she handled, for example, all estate matters after the death of Goethe's mother, Catharina Elisabeth Goethe, in Frankfurt am Main. She enjoyed attending social gatherings, dances and theater in Weimar as well as other locations, including Bad Lauchstädt, where the Weimar theater company performed throughout the summer. Vulpius had a keen sense of aesthetics, and Goethe at times relied on her advice. He stated that he could not and would not continue the theater business in Bad Lauchstädt without her. The Weimar court sculptor Carl Gottlieb Weisser made a bust of Vulpius during 1811–1812; a bronze copy was placed in the garden pavilion of Bad Lauchstädt, designed specially to display it.

With advancing age, Vulpius's health declined. Like her husband and their son August, she likely consumed too much alcohol. In 1815, she suffered a stroke. The following year, she developed kidney failure, accompanied by acute pain. After a week of suffering, she died on 6 June 1816, at the age of 51. Goethe did not speak at her funeral, which took place in the Jacobsfriedhof in Weimar. Friedrich Schiller's wife Charlotte von Lengefeld wrote of Goethe after Vulpius's death, The poor man wept bitterly. It grieves me that he should shed tears over such things. Her grave, lost for decades, was rediscovered in 1888 and marked with a proper gravestone, on which Goethe's farewell verses were inscribed: You seek, o sun, in vain, / To shine through the dark clouds! / The whole gain of my life / Is to cry for her loss.

== Descendants ==
Vulpius's and Goethe's only surviving son, Julius August Walther von Goethe (1789–1830), became chamberlain to the Grand Duke of Saxe-Weimar. He married Ottilie von Pogwisch (1796–1872), who was highly accomplished. She later cared for Goethe until he died in 1832.

The couple had three children: Walther Wolfgang Freiherr von Goethe (1818–1885), a composer of operettas and songs; Wolfgang Maximilian Freiherr von Goethe (1820–1883), a jurist and poet; and Alma Sedina Henriette Cornelia von Goethe (1827–1844).

== Legacy ==
Until the early 20th century, Vulpius received scant attention. She was recalled mainly through the many derogatory remarks of her contemporaries. Then, in 1916, Hans Gerhard Gräf published the correspondence between Vulpius and Goethe. Also in 1916, Etta Federn, an Austrian-born feminist writer, published the first biography of Vulpius, taking a psychological approach to her relationship with Goethe. In 1949, Wolfgang Vulpius (great-great-grandson of Vulpius's brother Christian August Vulpius) wrote another biography of Vulpius, reissued in 1957. Further details about her life were uncovered by Sigrid Damm in her Vulpius biography published in 1997.

== Film portrayal ==
- In the 1999 film Die Braut, Vulpius was portrayed by Veronica Ferres and Goethe by Herbert Knaup.

== Bibliography ==
- Effi Biedrzynski: Goethes Weimar. Das Lexikon der Personen und Schauplätze. Artemis und Winkler, München und Zürich, 1993, Seite 123, ISBN 3-7608-1064-0.
- Sigrid Damm: Christiane und Goethe. Insel Publishing, Frankfurt a. M. and Leipzig, 1998, ISBN 3-458-16912-1.
- Sigrid Damm (selection and epilogue): Christianes und Goethes Ehebriefe. Behalte mich ja lieb! Insel Publishing, Frankfurt a. M. und Leipzig, 1998 – Insel-Bücherei 1190, ISBN 3-458-19190-9.
- Etta Federn: Christiane von Goethe: Ein Betrag zur Psychologie Goethes. Delphin, Munich, 1916.
- Wolfgang Frühwald: Goethes Hochzeit. Insel Verlag, Frankfurt a. M. und Leipzig 2007 – Insel-Bücherei, 1294, ISBN 978-3-458-19294-7.
- Hans Gerhard Gräf (ed.): Goethes Briefwechsel mit seiner Frau. 2 Bde., Rütten & Loening, Frankfurt a. M. 1916.
- Eckart Kleßmann: Christiane – Goethes Geliebte und Gefährtin. Artemis und Winkler, München und Zürich, 1992, ISBN 3-7608-1076-4. Extended new edition: TvR Medienverlag Jena 2016, ISBN 978-3-940431-57-8.
- Lore Mallachow: Du bist mir nah. Mitteldeutscher Publishing, Halle (Saale), 1957.
- Ulrike Müller-Harang: Das Theater zur Zeit Goethes. Klassikerstätten Publishing, Weimar, 1999, ISBN 3-7443-0099-4.
- Wolfgang W. Parth: Goethes Christiane – Ein Lebensbild. Kindler, München 1980, ISBN 3-463-00796-7.
- Wolfgang Vulpius: Christiane. Lebenskunst und Menschlichkeit in Goethes Ehe. Kiepenheuer Publishing, Weimar, 1953.
- Sophien- oder Weimarer Edition (WA): Goethes Werke. Herausgegeben im Auftrage der Großherzogin Sophie von Sachsen. Abtlg. I–IV. 133 Bände in 143 Teilen. H. Böhlau, Weimar, 1887–1919.
- Annette Seemann: Christiane von Goethe: Dichtung und Wahrheit. Mitteldeutscher Verlag, Halle (Saale), 2018. ISBN 978-3-96311-095-5.
