= Cornelia Schlosser =

German author of letters and sister of Johann Wolfgang von Goethe (1750–1777)

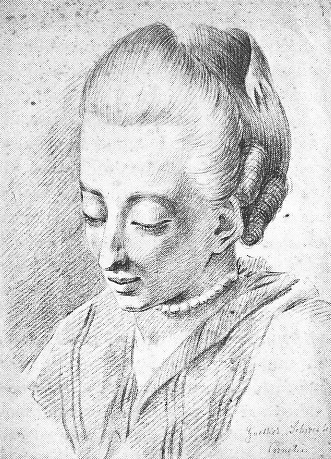
- Cornelia around 1770. Drawing by Johann Ludwig Ernst Morgenstern
- Born: Cornelia Friederica Christiana Goethe; 7 December 1750; Frankfurt on Main, Holy Roman Empire
- Died: 8 June 1777 (aged 26); Emmendingen, Holy Roman Empire
- Occupation: Scribe
- Spouse: Johann Georg Schlosser
- Children: Maria Anne Louise; Catharina Elisabeth Julie
- Parent(s): Johann Caspar Goethe (father); Catharina Elisabeth Textor (mother)
- Relatives: Johann Wolfgang von Goethe (brother); Christiane Vulpius (sister-in-law); August von Goethe (nephew); Walther von Goethe (grandnephew)

Cornelia Friederica Christiana Schlosser (née Goethe; 7 December 1750 – 8 June 1777) was the sister and only sibling of Johann Wolfgang von Goethe who survived to adulthood.

== Life ==
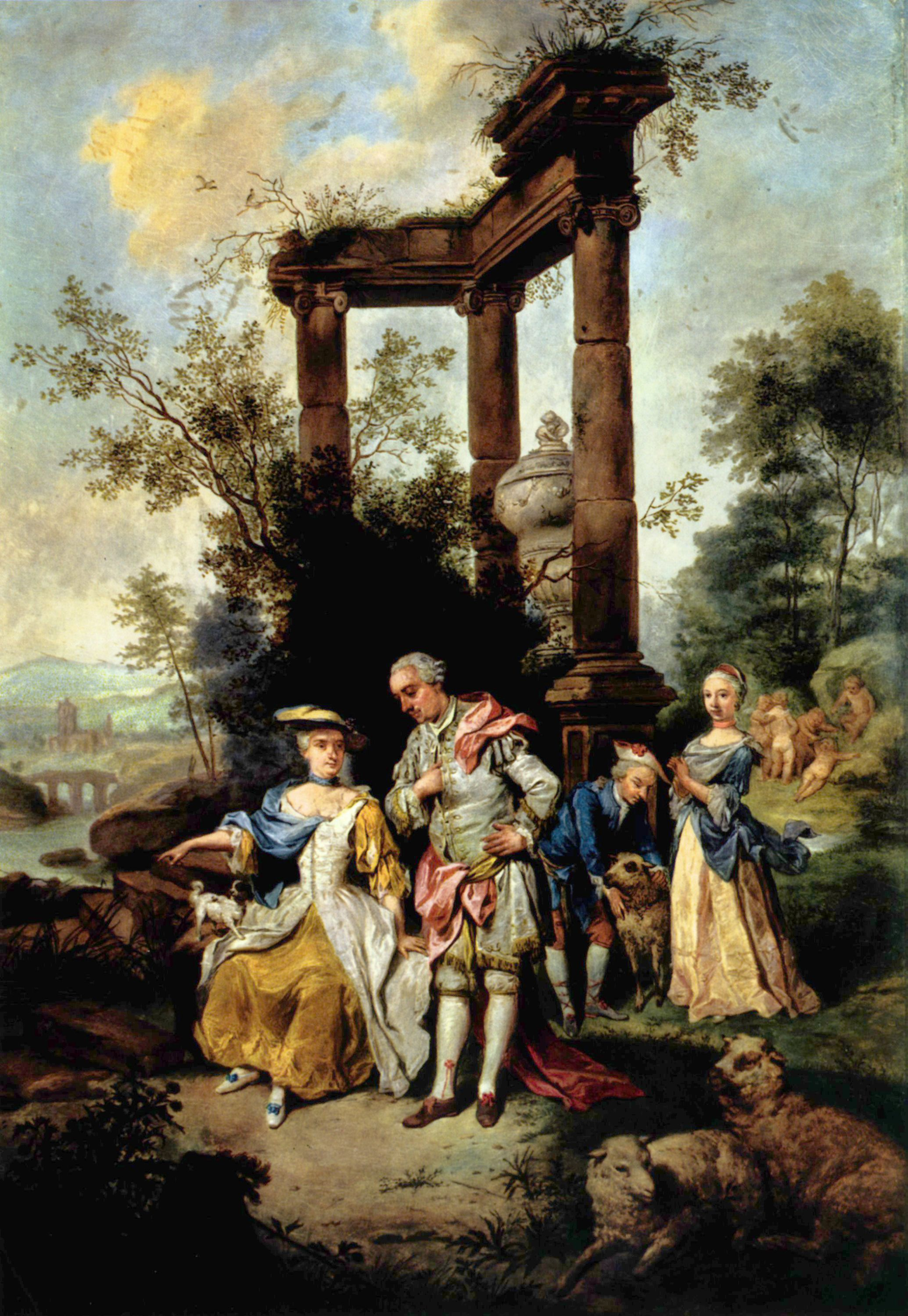
The Goethe family in 1762. Cornelia is to the far right.

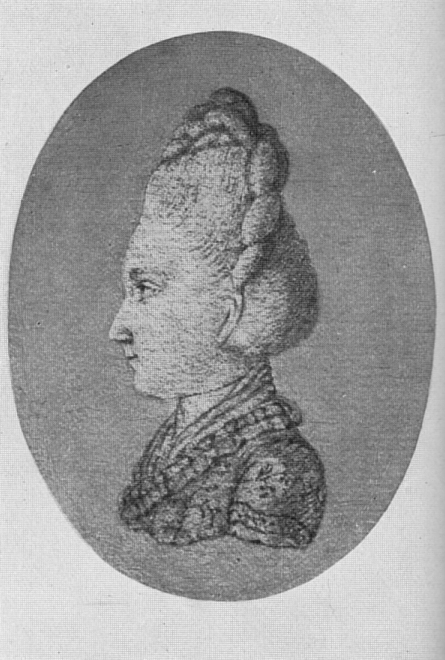
Cornelia Schlosser

Cornelia Goethe, 15 months younger than her brother Johann Wolfgang, was born in Frankfurt am Main. Her father, imperial councillor Johann Caspar Goethe (1710–1782), thought it appropriate for an upper-class woman to have some higher education, and Cornelia was educated together with her brother, which was unusual in those days. At the age of three, she was sent to a kindergarten school, where she learned reading and writing with Magdalena Hoff. From the age of seven, she and her brother were taught together by a tutor, Johann Heinrich Thym. Latin and ancient Greek were the first languages she was taught, and two years later, she also began receiving French lessons. She also learnt English, Italian, law, geography, mathematics, and calligraphy, as well as singing, piano, and drawing. She also learnt fencing and horseriding, and received lessons in dance and etiquette. In her leisure time, she pursued literary interests, which she discussed with her brother.

Cornelia did not fit into the relaxed environment of that time due to her serious and hypochondriac nature. She did not relate well to her parents, as there were significant differences between her personality and that of her mother Catharina Elisabeth Goethe (1731–1808), who was known as the cheerful "Frau Rat" (Lady Councillor), and as she did not forgive her father for having overburdened her with studies and thus having robbed her of some joys of childhood. She could relate better to her brother, who understood her and did not ignore her interest in intellectual pursuits. She had a good relationship with Johann Wolfgang and turned out to be a source of love, comfort, and support for him when he was plagued by fears and self-reproach after his relationship with his girlfriend Gretchen ended. Goethe's relationship with Gretchen had led him to move in circles that were involved in somewhat criminal activities. These circumstances laid the foundations for a deep friendship between Cornelia and Johann Wolfgang. Of all relationships in her life, Cornelia's relationship with her brother was the closest and a source of great happiness for her. Her circle of friends consisted of women who were enjoying the exuberance of youth and did not fear her as a rival.

When Johann Wolfgang went to Leipzig to study law, Cornelia stayed at home in Frankfurt. Johann Wolfgang's three years in Leipzig interrupted the siblings' daily contact for the first time. Cornelia observed that her brother adopted the prevalent attitude of the time toward women, that is, one in which women were considered subordinate to men. She took great interest in her brother's literary accomplishments and was often the first to know about his plans, drafts, and revisions. Letters from this time that she wrote to her friend Katharina Fabricius in French have been preserved. Cornelia suffered the disadvantages of being a woman at that time, but did not see an alternative to marriage: Es ist offensichtlich, daß ich nicht immer Mädchen bleiben kann, überdies wäre es sehr lächerlich, sich das vorzunehmen. ("It is obvious that I cannot stay a girl all my life, and planning to do so would be ridiculous."). In 1773, she married Johann Georg Schlosser (1739–1799), a jurist, and had two daughters, Maria Anne Louise Schlosser (1774–1811), who married a Prussian official from Königsberg Georg Heinrich Ludwig Nicolovius (1767–1839) and Catharina Elisabeth Julie Schlosser (1777–1793).

She died in Emmendingen at the age of 26.

== Legacy ==
The interdisciplinary Cornelia Goethe Center for Women's and Gender Studies at the University of Frankfurt is named after her, as is the Cornelia Goethe Prize that it awards.

== Bibliography ==
- Hock, Sabine (1998). "Zeitlebens litt Cornelia an ihrer 'Hässlichkeit': die jung gestorbene Schwester Goethes krankte an einem unglücklichen und unerfüllten Leben" [All her life Cornelia suffered from her "ugliness": Goethe's sister, who died young, suffered from an unhappy and unfulfilled life (Biography of Cornelia Goethe)]. Wochendienst: Presse- und Informationsamt der Stadt Frankfurt am Main (in German) (7): 1–2.
- "Cornelia Goethe (1750-1777)" (in German). Cornelia Goethe Center for Women's and Gender Studies at the University of Frankfurt. Archived from the original on 31 January 2017.
- Witkowski, Georg (28 September 2011) [reprint of 1903 edition]. Cornelia, die Schwester Goethes [Cornelia, Goethe's Sister] (in German). Nabu Press. ISBN 9781246961430.
- Baumann, Melanie (1990). Cornelia Goethe, Briefe und Correspondance secrete 1767–1769 [Cornelia Goethe, Letters and Secret Correspondance 1767–1769] (in German). Freiburg: Kore. ISBN 3926023228.
- Prokop, Ulrike (1991). Die Illusion vom Großen Paar. Weibliche Lebensentwürfe 1750–1770 [The Illusion of the Great Couple. Feminine Life Plans 1750–1770] (in German). Frankfurt: Fischer. ISBN 3596273978.
- Prokop, Ulrike (1991). Die Illusion vom großen Paar. Band 2: Das Tagebuch der Cornelia Goethe [The Illusion of the Great Couple. Volume 2: The Diary of Cornelia Goethe] (in German). Frankfurt: Fischer. ISBN 3596273978.
- Linden, Walfried (1989). "Marie, Gretchen, Helena. Goethe und seine Schwester Cornelia im Spiegel seiner Frauengestalten" [Marie, Gretchen, Helena: an analysis of Goethe and his Minter Cornelia in the context of women in Goethe's poetry]. Jahrbuch der Psychoanalyse (in German) (27). Stuttgart: Frommann-Holzboog: 224–239. ISSN 0075-2363.
- Damm, Sigrid (1992). Cornelia, Goethe (in German). Frankfurt am Main and Leipzig: Insel. ISBN 3458331522.
- Fleischer, Stephanie (1996). "Literatur und Lebensgestaltung. Cornelia als Leserin zeitgenössischer Briefromane" [Literature and Life Planning. Cornelia as a Reader of Contemporary Letter Novels]. Welfengarten. Jahrbuch für Essayismus (in German). Vol. 6. pp. 69–82. ISBN 9783927715363.
- Nagelschmidt, Ilse (1999). "Briefe und Tagebücher als Effekt Biographischen Erzählens. Zwei Frauen im Spiegel des Textes. Cornelia Goethe. Brigitte Reimann" [Letters and Diaries as an Effect of Biographical Narration. Two Women Reflected in the Text. Cornelia Goethe. Brigitte Reimann]. In Fasold, Regina (ed.). Begegnung der Zeiten. Festschrift für Helmut Richter zum 65. Geburtstag [Meeting of the Times. Festschrift for Helmut Richter on his 65th Birthday] (in German). Universitätsverlag, Leipzig. pp. 277–291. ISBN 3933240794.
- Kraus, Gerlinde (2010). Cornelia Goethe – Ein typisches Frauenleben im 18. Jahrhundert? Porträt einer Frankfurter Bürgerin [Cornelia Goethe – A Typical Woman's Life in the 18th Century? Portrait of a Bougeoise Woman in Frankfurter] (in German). Mühlheim am Main: Schroeder Verlagsbuchhandlung. ISBN 9783981125184.
