= Justus Juncker =

German painter (1703–1767)

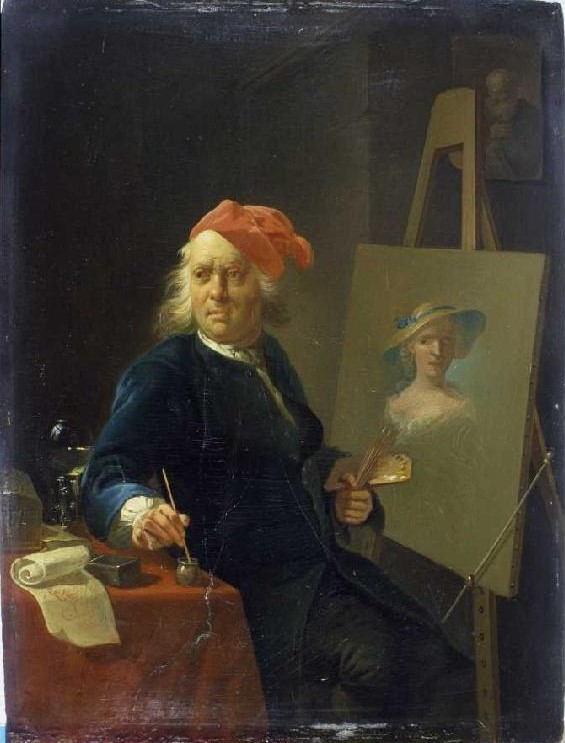
- A self-portrait by Juncker titled "Selbstbildnis vor der Staffelei" ("Self-portrait in front of the easel")
- Born: 24 July 1703; Mainz
- Died: 6 June 1767 (aged 63); Frankfurt

Justus Juncker (24 July 1703 – 14 June 1767) was a German genre and flower painter. He is also known for his association with Johann Wolfgang von Goethe and his father Johann Caspar Goethe.

== Biography ==
Juncker was born in Mainz, Electorate of Mainz, Holy Roman Empire – on 24 July 1703. He moved to Frankfurt as a child, where he studied under Johann Hugo Schlegel. He was subsequently influenced by the collection of Baron von Häckel, and specifically the collection's works from the Dutch painter Thomas Wijck. It is alleged that Juncker lived in London for a short time, but this is not documented. He was married in Eschborn in 1722, and settled in Frankfurt in 1723, the year in which his son, Isaak, was born. In 1826 Juncker obtained permanent residency in Frankfurt. Juncker was a teacher to his son Isaak Juncker and step-son Johann Daniel Bager, who both became painters in their own right.

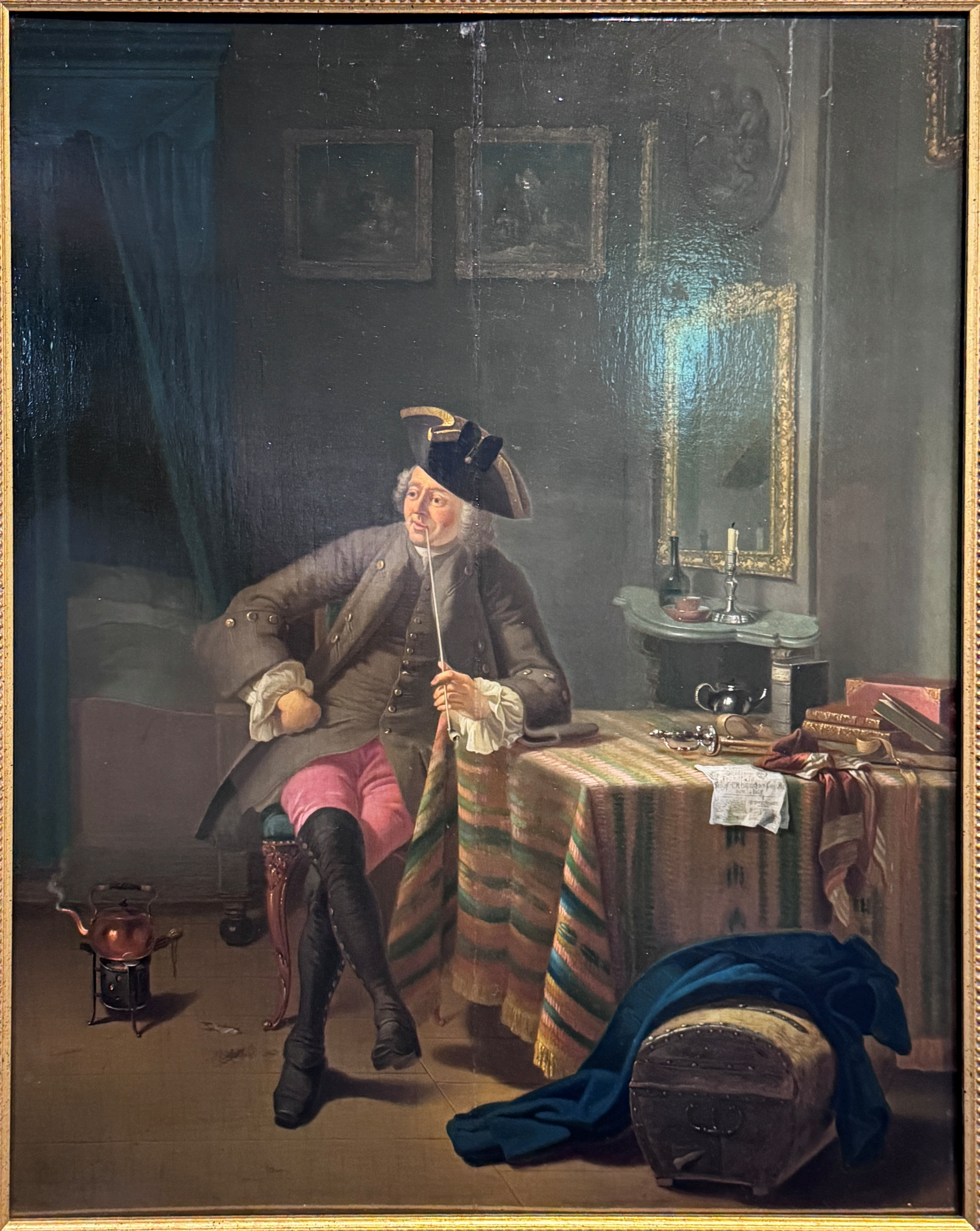
Smoking man in an interior, Anhaltische Gemäldegalerie Dessau

From the 1740s Juncker specialised in still life painting, though he also created several genre paintings after this point.

Juncker was one of the artists that Johann Caspar Goethe (father of the famous German writer Johann Wolfgang von Goethe) commissioned to decorate the Goethe family house after the death of Johann Caspar's mother in 1754. Juncker created two still-life paintings for Goethe, one of which is mentioned in the younger Goethe's autobiography "Dichtung und Wahrheit":

One such exquisite board was entrusted to the painter Juncker, who was to depict an ornate flowerpot with the most important flowers in his artificial and delicate manner.

— Johann Wolfgang von Goethe, Dichtung und Wahrheit

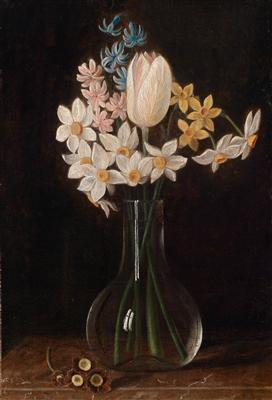
A still life painting by Juncker, similar to that which Goethe describes in Dichtung und Wahrheit.

In his later years, Juncker tried to found a drawing and painting school in Frankfurt with other artists, but the project never came to fruition.
