= Elisabeth von Adlerflycht =

German painter

- Born: Susanna Maria Rebecca Elisabeth von Riese; September 23, 1775; Frankfurt, Holy Roman Empire
- Died: March 15, 1846 (aged 70); Frankfurt, German Confederation
- Education: Trained under Johann Daniel Bager
- Known for: Painting
- Notable work: Rhine panorama
- Spouse: Justinian von Adlerflycht
- Patrons: Johann Friedrich Cotta von Cottendorf

Susanna Maria Rebecca Elisabeth von Adlerflycht (born von Riese; September 23, 1775 – March 15, 1846) was a German painter known for her cartographic illustration of the Rhine Valley, the first in a genre of tourist maps known as Rheinpanorama.

== Life and work ==
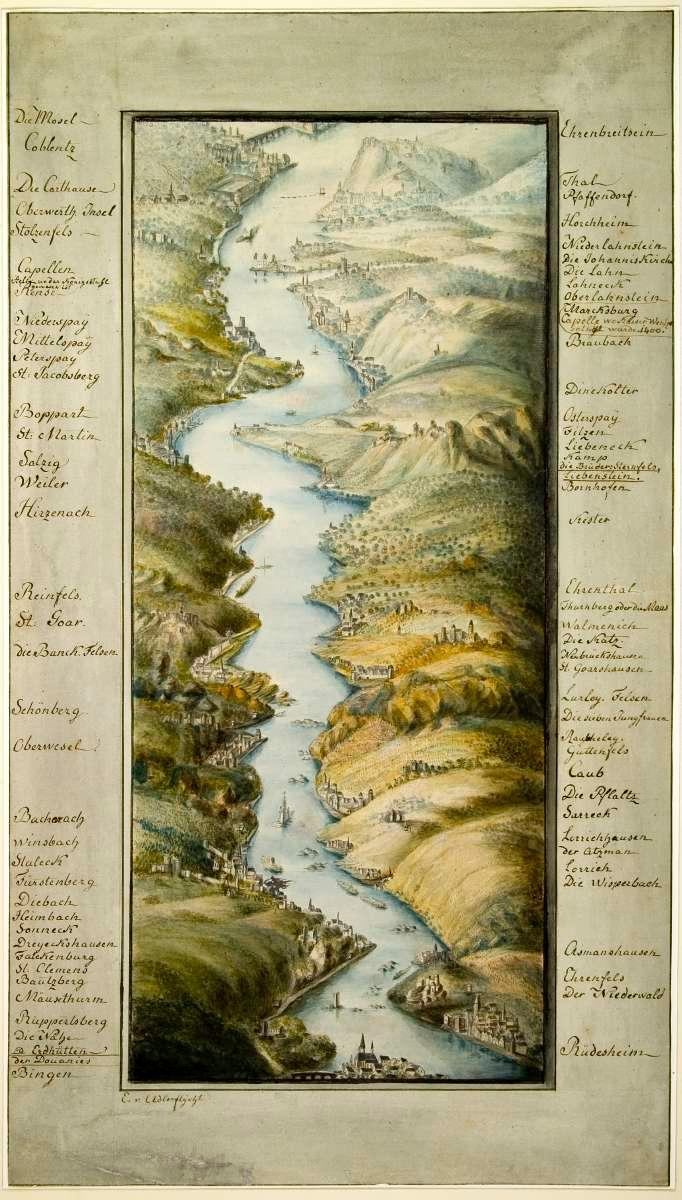
Das Rheintal von Bingen bis Koblenz (1811)

Elisabeth von Adlerflycht studied in Frankfurt under Johann Daniel Bager (1754–1815), who painted still lifes and portraits. In 1797 she married Justinian von Adlerflycht, who later became a senator of the Free City of Frankfurt.

During a cruise on the Rhine in 1811, she drew preparatory sketches for a panoramic painting of the Rhine valley from the mouth of the Nahe to the Moselle. The panorama used continuous parallel projection to illustrate an overhead view of the full Rhine Valley. Johann Friedrich Cotta von Cottendorf (1764–1832) recognized the novelty of this technique of making pictorial maps and initiated the lithographic printing of this sheet by the Stuttgart geographer and cartographer Heinrich Keller in 1822. In 1823, Friedrich Wilhelm Delkeskamp of the Frankfurt publishing company Friedrich Wilmans published this classic panorama of the Rhine from Mainz to Cologne.

Elisabeth von Adlerflycht had a painting gallery in Frankfurt, where today a street is named after the von Adlerflycht family.
