= Johann Friedrich Morgenstern =

German painter and etcher (1777–1844)

- Born: Johann Friedrich Morgenstern; 8 October 1777; Frankfurt, Holy Roman Empire
- Died: 21 January 1844 (aged 66); Frankfurt, Hesse, Germany
- Other name: J. F. Morgenstern
- Occupations: Painter; Etcher
- Known for: Painting; Etching
- Children: Karl Morgenstern
- Parents: Johann Ludwig Ernst Morgenstern (father); Anna Maria Alleinz (mother)
- Relatives: Johann Christoph Morgenstern (grandfather)

Johann Friedrich Morgenstern (8 October 1777 – 21 January 1844) was a German painter, etcher, and painting restorer.

== Early life and education ==
Johann Friedrich Morgenstern was born on 8 October 1777 in Frankfurt, Holy Roman Empire (now part of Hesse, Germany).

The son of German painter and etcher Johann Ludwig Ernst Morgenstern and Anna Maria Alleinz, Johann Friedrich pursued an artistic path. His grandfather was Johann Christoph Morgenstern, an 18th-century German painter. Taught by his father in his early years, J.F. Morgenstern later went to Dresden to continue his studies.

== Career ==
Johann Friedrich Morgenstern gained recognition as an artist in part due to his opportunity to copy works by Johann Heinrich Roos and others during his early career, particularly between 1797 and 1798. Morgenstern produced several etched sheets based on drawings by Roos. Additionally, he created etchings inspired by drawings of Pieter de Bloot, David Teniers the Younger, Christian Wilhelm Ernst Dietrich, and his own studies. His etching repertoire includes landscapes with figures and animals, as well as studies of human figures, such as busts of elderly men and women, and depictions of individual animals. The Städel Collection and the Frankfurt Historical Museum house his paintings and drawings of Old Frankfurt and its surroundings.

Alongside his landscape paintings and etched works, he was highly skilled at reviving partially destroyed paintings.

Johann Friedrich's son, Karl Morgenstern, was born in Frankfurt am Main in 1812 and later settled in Munich as a landscape painter.

Johann Friedrich's father died in 1819 in Frankfurt am Main.

== Death ==
Johann Friedrich Morgenstern died on 21 January 1844 in Frankfurt, Germany.

== Gallery ==
Works by Johann Friedrich Morgenstern

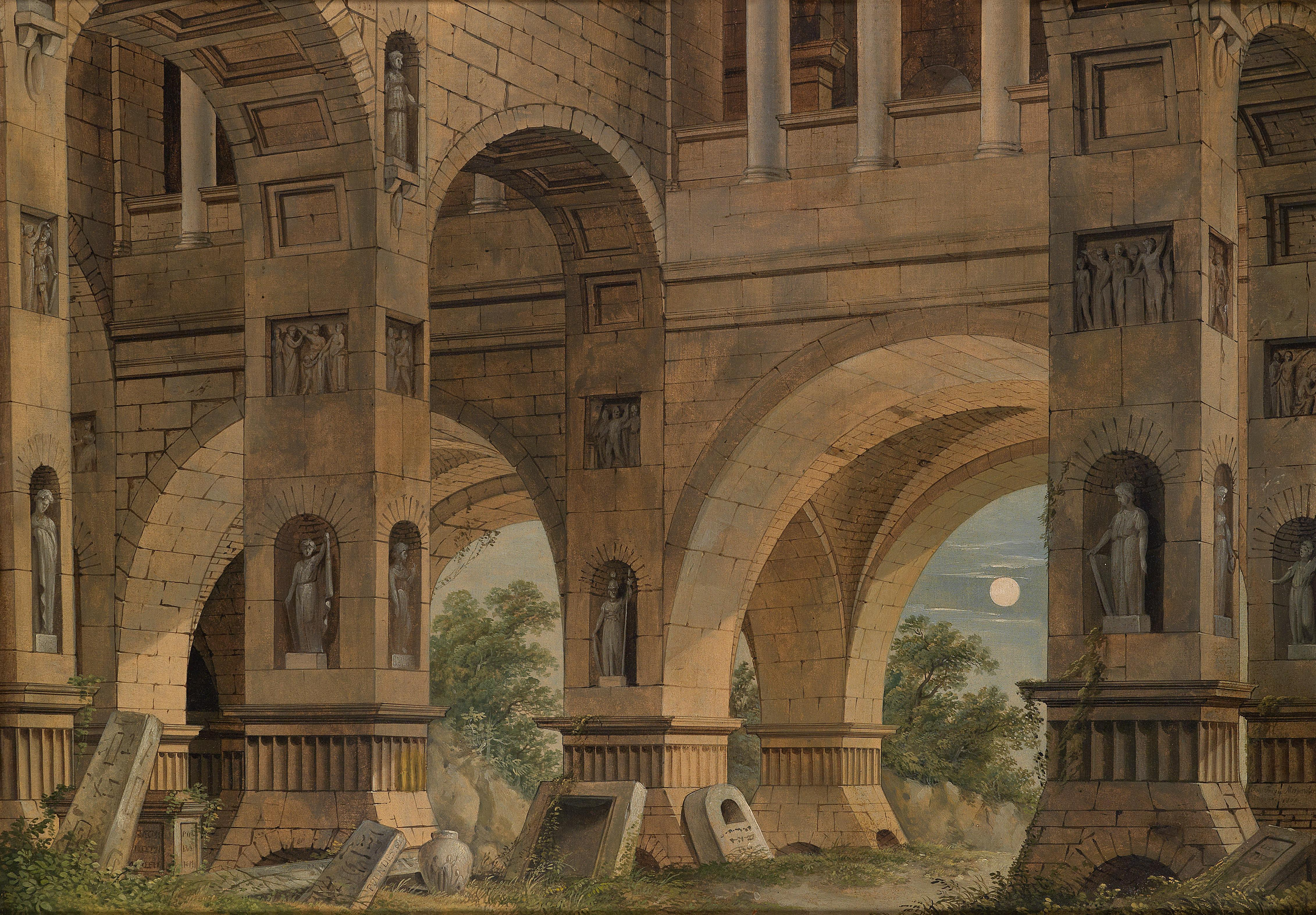

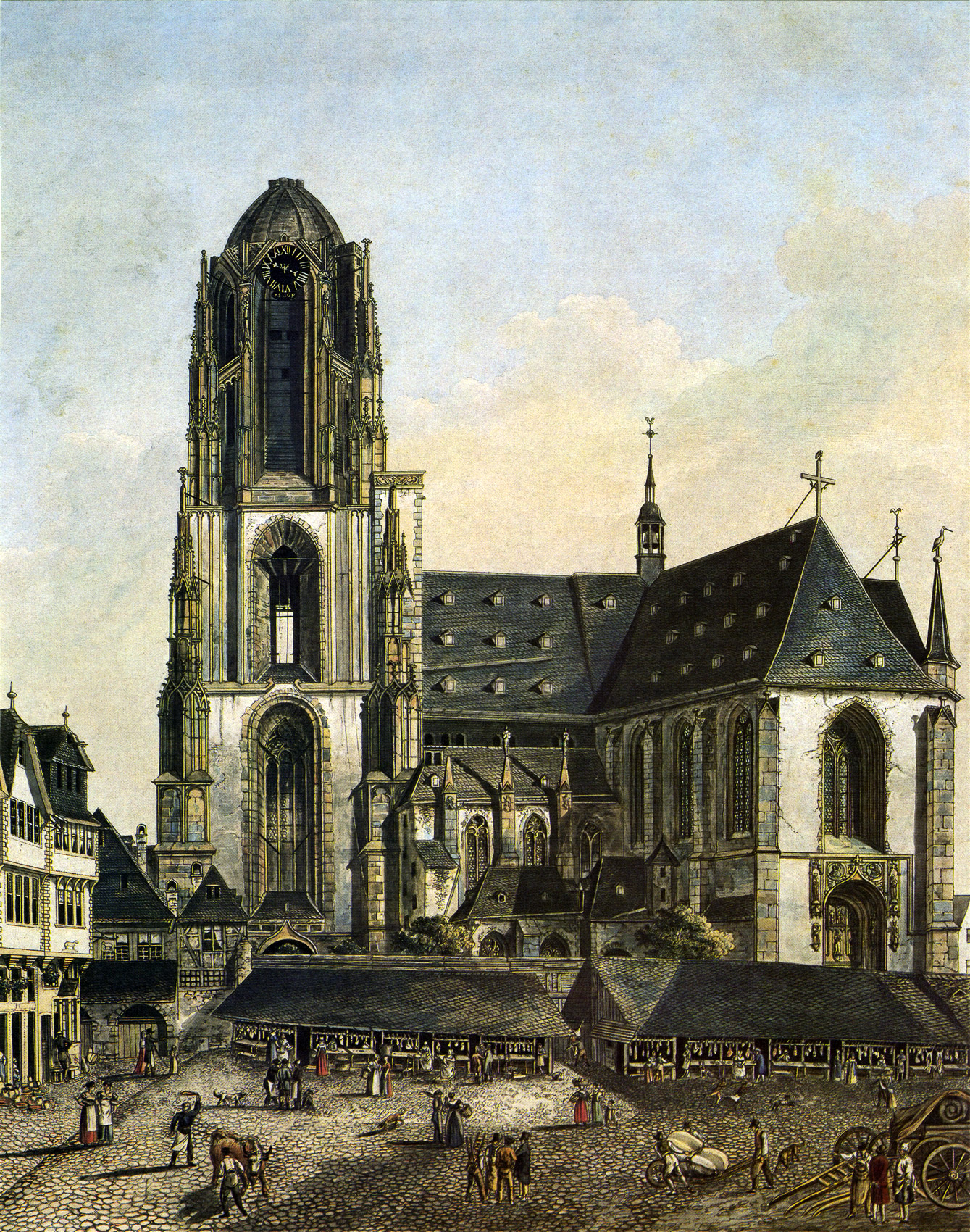

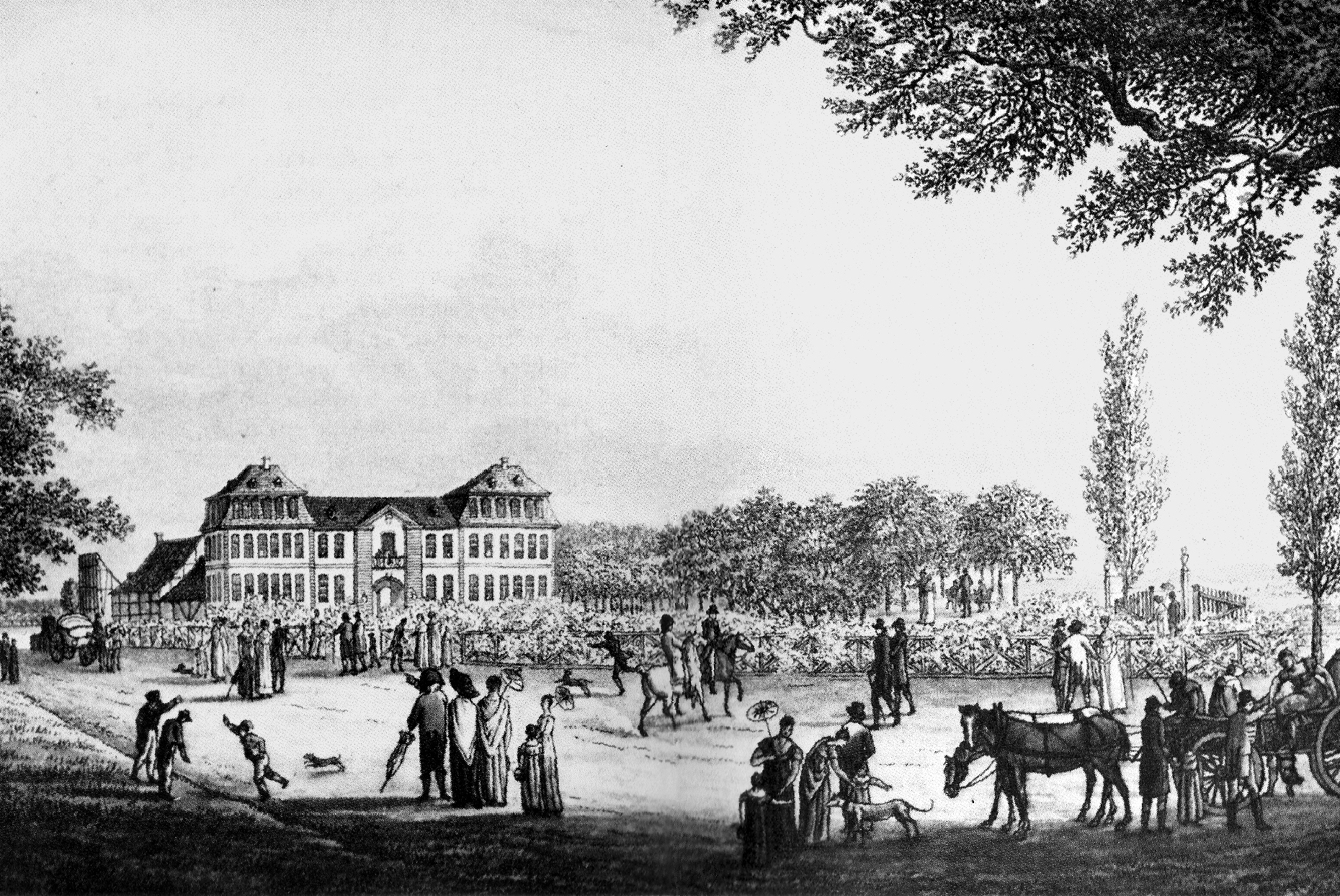

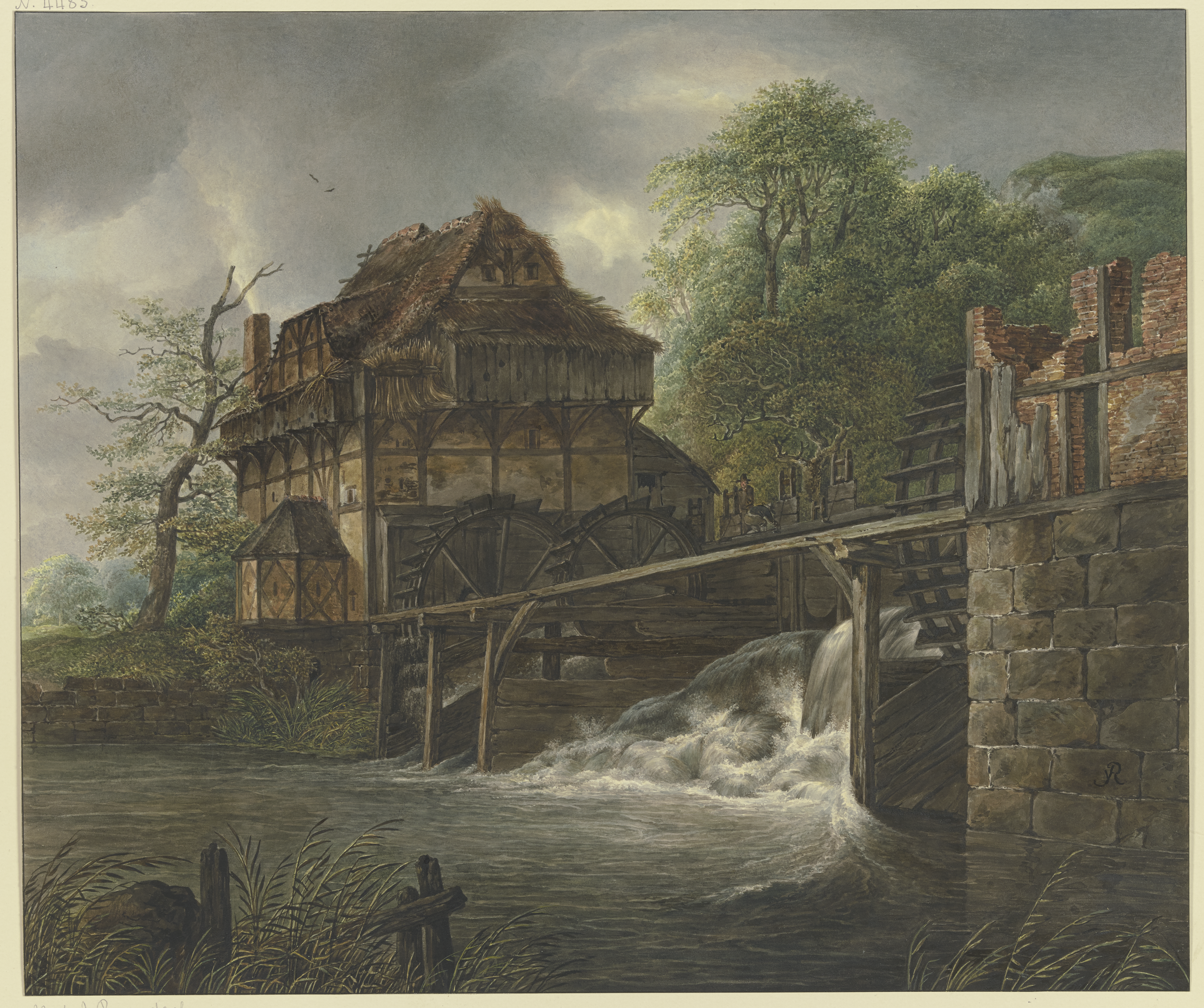

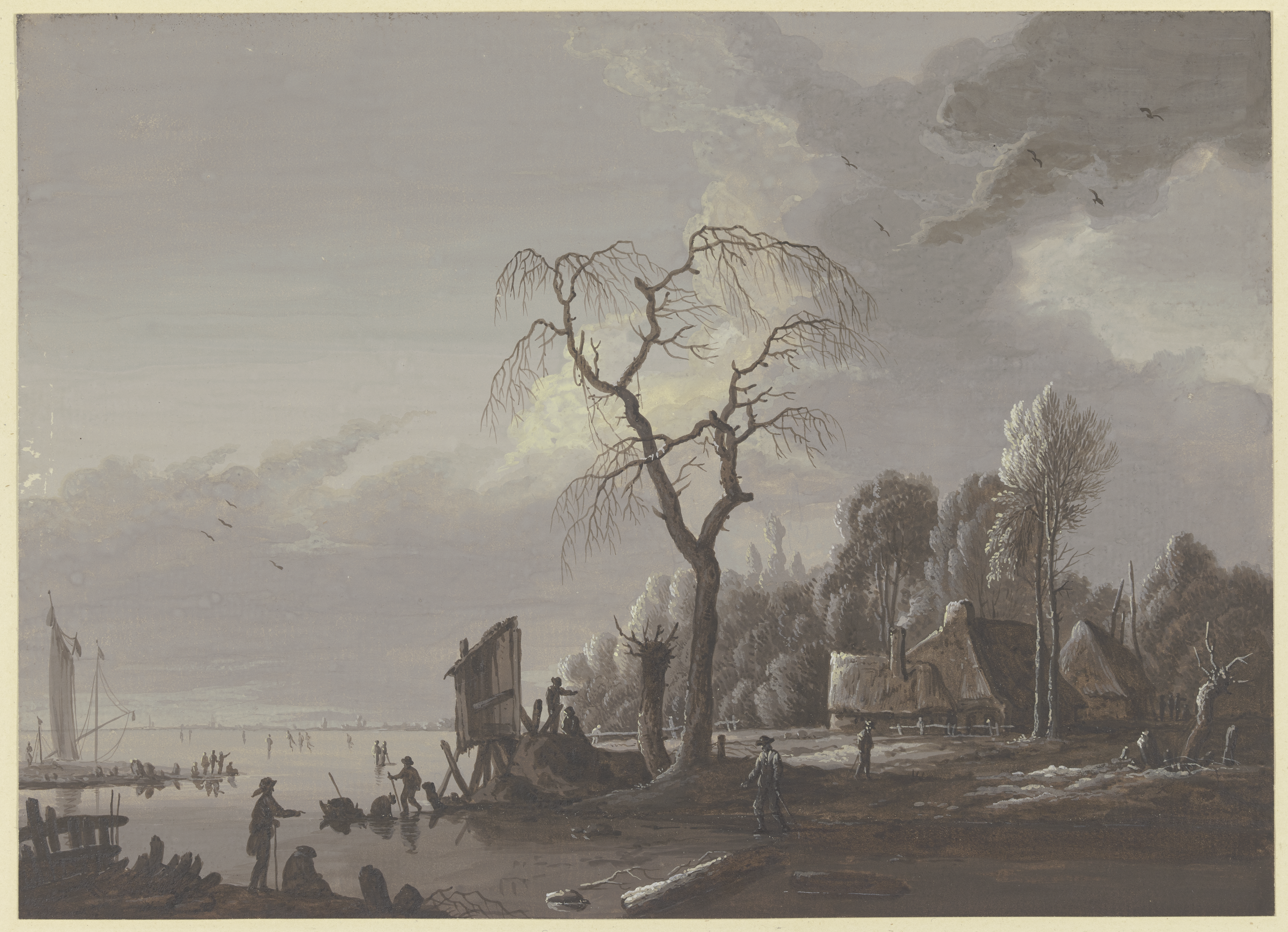
