= Hans Gerhard Gräf =

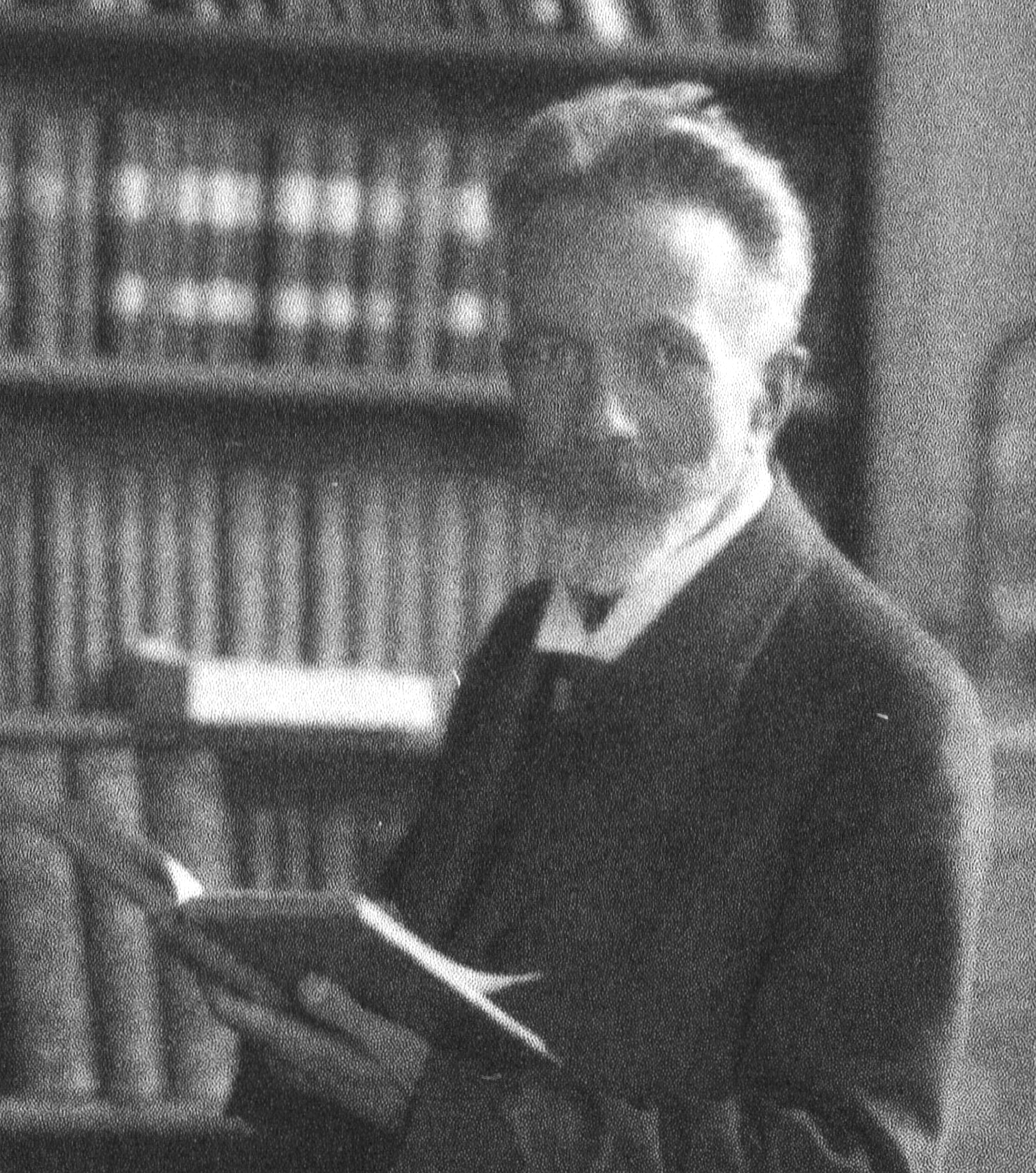
Hans Gerhard Gräf

Hans Gerhard Gräf (5 May 1864 – 20 December 1942) was a German Goethe specialist.

Gräf was born on 5 May 1864 in Weimar. He was essential in preparation of the authoritative 1887-1919 Weimar complete edition of the works of Johann Wolfgang von Goethe (also known as the Sophie edition). Gräf was primarily responsible for editing Goethe's journals and excerpting anthologies of journal entries. In 1916 Gräf also edited Goethe's correspondence with Goethe's mistress and wife, Christiane Vulpius.

At the turn of the century, Gräf became a researcher at the Herzog August Library in Wolfenbüttel, where he assembled a collection of Goethe's printed remarks about his own poetry, a landmark work in the Goethe movement known affectionately as the Gräf (German: Goethes Gedruckte Äusserungen uber seine Dichtungen). In later years, Gräf returned to Weimar, both his – and Goethe's – hometown.

Gräf also made a known for himself by exploring Goethe's relationship to the town of Berka (now Bad Berka) and anthologizing Goethe's love poetry for the publisher Insel Verlag. A festschrift was published in Gräf's honor in 1921, and in 1924, at the urging of the firm's chief editor Bartel, the Leipzig publisher of Haessel issued a Goethe anthology in his honor. Later, Gräf collaborated on yet another Goethe edition (the Dünndruck Edition) for the Insel firm. During the second World War, Gräf moved to Jena, not far from Weimar, where he died in 1942.

Gräf also published two volumes of his own poetry – the second lasting two print runs.
