= Georg Heinrich Ludwig Nicolovius =

Prussian ministerial official (1767–1839)

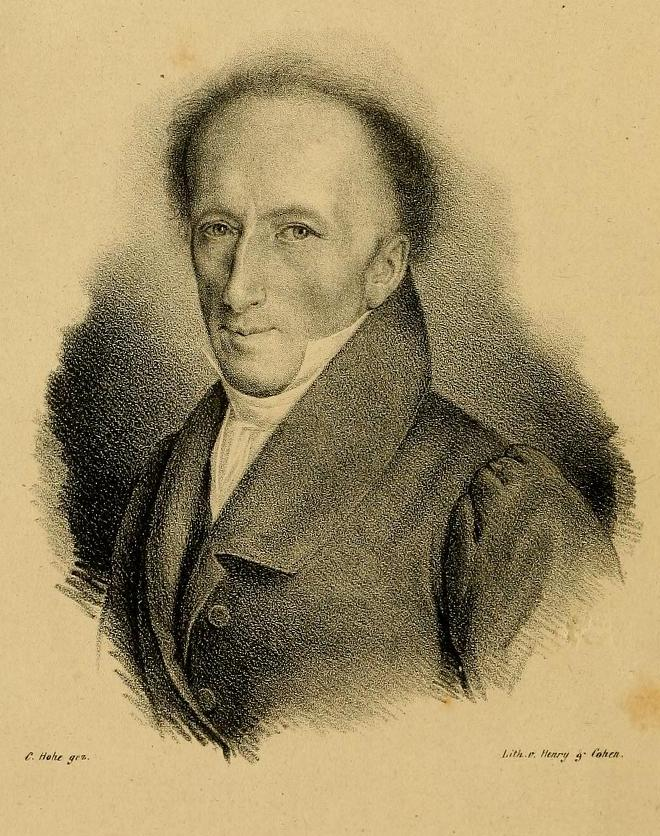
- Ludwig Nicolovius Lithograph by Henry & Cohen from a painting by Christian Hohe
- Born: 13 January 1767; Cottbus, Brandenburg, Prussia, Germany
- Died: 2 November 1839 (aged 72)
- Occupations: State official; Education reformer
- Spouse: Luise Maria Schlosser (1774‍–‍1811) (m. 1795; died 1811)
- Children: 9, including Alfred Georg Nicolovius (1806-1890)

Georg Heinrich Ludwig Nicolovius (13 January 1767 – 2 November 1839) was a senior Prussian ministerial official whose responsibilities primarily encompassed church and school affairs.

== Life ==
=== Family provenance and early years ===
Ludwig Nicolovius was born in the capital of East Prussia, Königsberg. His father, Matthias Balthasar Nicolovius (1717–1778), was a senior official (Hofrat) in the Ministry of State. One of his brothers, Friedrich Nicolovius (1768–1836), later became a publisher whose authors included Immanuel Kant. When he was only 11 Georg Heinrich was orphaned, after which, with his siblings (two brothers and two sisters), he was bought up by an unmarried great aunt called Johanna Catherina Reußner, who ensured that the boys were educated at the well regarded Collegium Fridericianum (secondary school). This respected the wishes of their deceased father who had attended the same establishment.

=== Further education ===
In 1782 he transferred to the Albertus University of Königsberg where he studied Jurisprudence and Philology. Two years later he decided on a switch to Theology, thinking to make a career in the church. Nicolovius was no disciple of Immanuel Kant, but he long nurtured a secret wish to meet Kant's friend, the brilliant philosopher Johann Georg Hamann (1730–1788). An opportunity for a meeting was finally secured in November 1785 and the two formed a close friendship during the Hamann's final years. Hamann's death in June 1788 affected him deeply.

In 1789 Nicolovius was accepted for training as Lutheran pastor, but as matters turned out his education over the next few years took an itinerant turn. In connection with his theological studies, in 1789/90 he undertook a study tour to England. Along the way he visited the Netherlands, Westfalia and the Rhineland. Important figures whom he got to know during his travels included the socialite philosopher Friedrich Heinrich Jacobi whom he visited in Düsseldorf, and members of the theological reformist circle in Münster such as Adelheid Amalie Gallitzin, Franz Friedrich Wilhelm von Fürstenberg, Bernhard Heinrich Overberg and the lawyer-poet Friedrich Leopold zu Stolberg-Stolberg. He formed a particularly warm friendship with Stolberg who at this point invited Nicolovius to join him on a two-year tour to Italy and Sicily. This enabled him to make a further range of contacts with the writers Friedrich Gottlieb Klopstock, Matthias Claudius and Johann Kaspar Lavater as well as with the pioneering educationalist Johann Heinrich Pestalozzi.

After returning to Germany during the first part of 1793, Nicolovius stayed with his friend Stolberg for a further six months as the latter's guest at his home in the Duchy of Holstein. Stolberg had come home to a senior administrative post in Eutin which was becoming a dynamic cultural centre at the time, and in 1795 Nicolovius himself accepted via Stolberg a post as First Secretary at the Archbishop's Court.

In 1795, while at Eutin, Ludwig Nicolovius married Luise Schlosser (1774–1811), a daughter of the polymath Johann Georg Schlosser and one of the two nieces of the celebrity poet-statesman, Johann Wolfgang von Goethe. At least five of their children would grow to adulthood.

=== Königsberg ===
Around 1800 Nicolovius' friend, Stolberg, underwent a personal crisis which involved resigning his public offices, relocating to Münster and converting his large family (apart from one dissident daughter) to the Catholic Church. Stolberg had been at the heart of the Eutin intellectual circle which now began to break up. Nicolovius was much affected. The Archbishopric of Lübeck (of which Eutin formed a part) was undergoing a crisis of its own, involving secularisation of the state: Nicolovius was urged by the Grand Duke, who had become a personal friend, not to abandon his post. It was only after much soul searching that in April 1805 he reigned his office and returned to Königsberg.

Later that year he accepted an education job with the Regional administration based in Königsberg. This gave him audit and control responsibilities (ein "Assessorenstelle") for the entire school system and the affairs in East Prussia of the Catholic Church. However, just a few months later, at the end of August 1805, the king had him promoted to the East Prussian secular "consistory" with a mandate to overhaul he entire school system and related church matters. In 1806/07 he was given additional responsibilities, as a Teaching Advisor ("Vortragender Rat") the Königsberg University Curatorium (governing council) and as chief librarian of the university's important "Silver Library" ("Silberbibliothek").

Starting in 1807, when Prussia had just lost half of its territory following military defeats and the Treaties of Tilsit, a series of far reaching administrative reforms were set in train. In 1808 Nicolovius was given the rank of State Councillor (Staatsrat) and leadership of the Department for Culture and Public Education (Sektion für Kultus und öffentlichen Unterricht) within the Prussian Interior Ministry. In 1817, with Napoleon defeated and many "normal" prewar borders restored, Nicolovius in effect retained his responsibilities within the newly launched Prussian Ministry of religious, educational and medical matters. Between 1824 and 1832 he had to give up the education portion of his brief to Karl Albert von Kamptz, but apart from this interlude his responsibilities remained very little changed till 1839.

Within the ministry headed up by Minister Altenstein, Nicolovius pushed through the reforms initiated by the king involving the Prussian Union of churches. Among other things he drafted the "memorandum" on the liturgy and church synod regulation. In the Agenda confrontation that broke out between the king and various church leaders after 1821, Nicolovius represented the government's position, but nevertheless worked to find acceptable compromises. His education reforms reflected the lengthy discussions that he had entered into over the years with Pestalozzi and Jacobi. Along with his government roles he was also vice-president of the Prussian National Bible Society.
