= Johann Jost Textor =

German politician and judge (1739–1792)

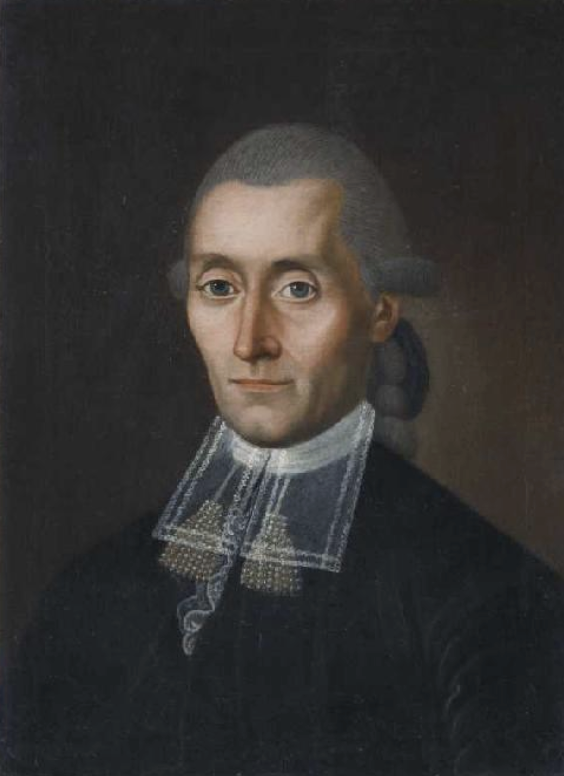
- Portrait of Textor

Mayor of Frankfurt
- In office 1783–1788
- Monarch: Joseph II

Member of the Frankfurt City Council
- In office 1771–1783
- Monarch: Joseph II

Personal details
- Born: 1739 Frankfurt, Holy Roman Empire
- Died: 1792 (aged 52–53) Frankfurt, Holy Roman Empire
- Parent: Johann Wolfgang Textor
- Education: University of Altdorf

Johann Jost Textor (1739 – 1792) was a German politician, lawyer, and judge, known for his service as the Mayor of Frankfurt from 1783 to 1789. He was also a member of the Frankfurt City Council from 1771 to 1783.

== Biography ==
Textor was born in 1739 in Frankfurt, Holy Roman Empire (present-day Frankfurt, Germany). His father was a politician who went by the name of Johann Wolfgang Textor (1693–1771). He was a brother of Catharina Elisabeth Goethe (1731–1808), mother of poet Johann Wolfgang von Goethe.

In 1760, Textor received a doctorate in law from the University of Altdorf.

In 1771, he was elected a member of the Frankfurt City Council, serving for a total of twelve years, until he was elected mayor in 1783.

== Family ==
Johann Jost Textor was married to Maria Margaretha Möller (1750–1798). They had five sons:

- Johann Wolfgang Textor (1767–1831), alderman in 1816–1831, member of the Inner Council in 1817–1820, member of the Legislative Assembly of the Free City of Frankfurt in 1820–1825, was married to Wilhelmine Justine Wörner (1773–1798), had two daughters.
  - Maria Margaretha Eleonore Textor (1793–1861), in 1826 married Businessman and Member of Parliament Johann Justus Finger (1781–1868).
  - Augusta Caroline Wilhelmine Textor (1796–1827), in 1815 married Johann August von Bihl (1771–1851), had two children.
- Johann Caspar Textor (b. 1768)
- Georg Adolf Textor (b. 1771)
- Friedrich Karl Ludwig Textor (1775–1851), German jurist and dialect writer, was married to Sophie Friederike Gess (1777–1815), had four children, including Wilhelm Carl Friedrich Textor (1806–1882).
- Johann David Textor (b. 1780)
