= Schloss (surname) =

Schloss is a German surname. Notable people with the surname include:

- Adolphe Schloss (1842–1910), German-French art collector
- Andrew Schloss (born 1952), American musician and computer engineer
- Arleen Schloss (1943–2026), American performance artist
- Cynthia Schloss (1948–1999), Jamaican singer
- Edith Schloss (1919–2011), American painter
- Eva Schloss (1929–2026), Austrian-English Holocaust survivor and memoirist
- Glenn Schloss (born 1972), American drummer
- Irene Schloss, Argentinian Antarctic researcher
- Jeremy Schloss (born 1973), Australian rugby player
- Patrick Schloss, American rehabilitation psychologist, educator, professor and university administrator
- Peter Schloss, Chinese-based businessman
- Ruth Schloss (1922–2013), Israeli painter and illustrator
- Sophia Mitri Schloss (born 2002), American actress
- Walter Schloss (1916–2012), American investor, fund manager and philanthropist
- Zander Schloss (born 1961), American musician, actor and composer

== See also ==
- Schlosser
