= David Ho (oceanographer) =

American scientist

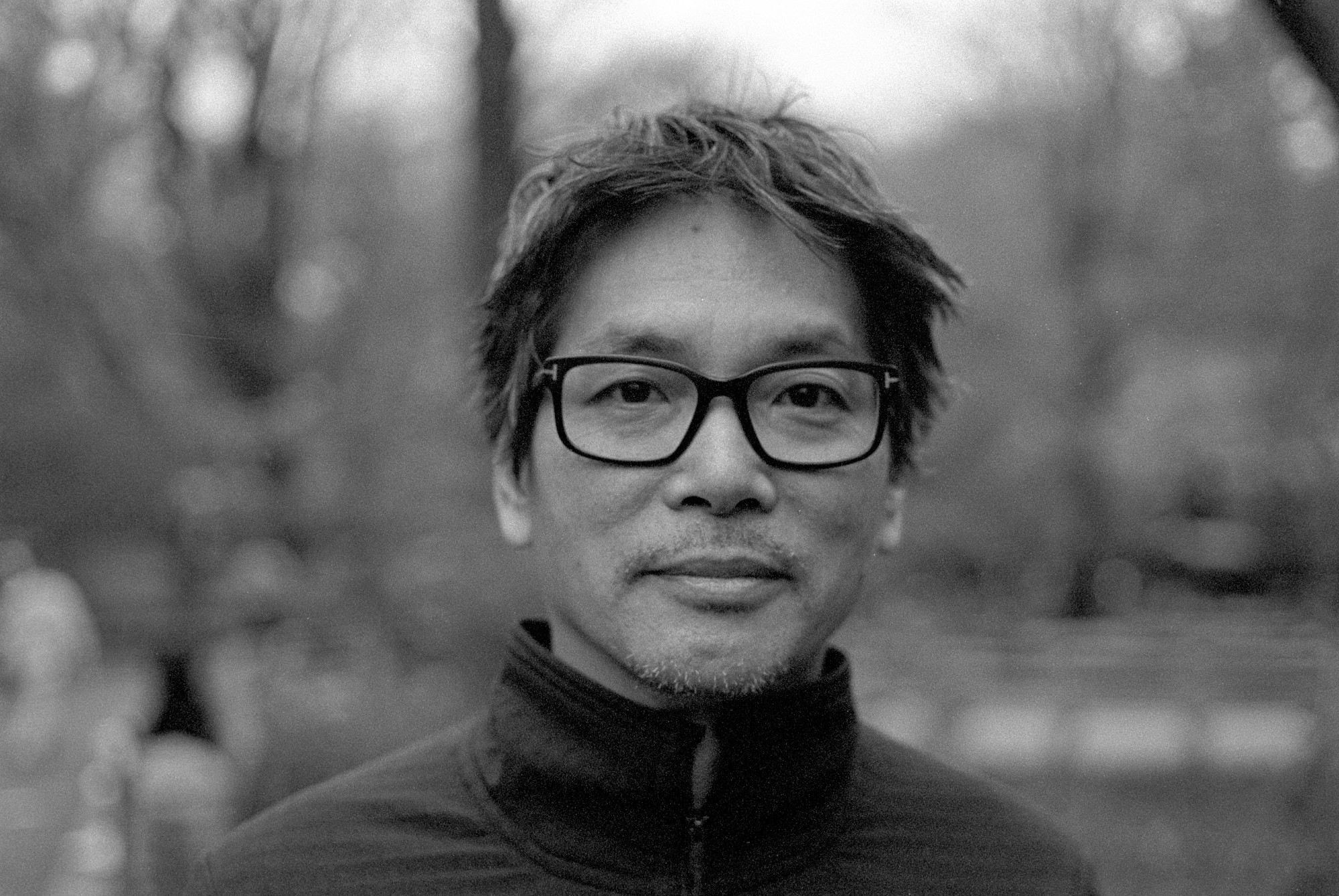
- David Ho in NYC, 2024
- Education: Columbia University
- Known for: Southern Ocean Gas Exchange Experiment; Bamboo Bike Project; Carbon Dioxide Removal
- Scientific career
- Fields: Oceanography; Carbon cycle; Climate change; Carbon dioxide removal
- Workplaces: University of Hawaiʻi at Mānoa; Lamont-Doherty Earth Observatory of Columbia University; Princeton University; Ecole normale supérieure; Arizona State University; [C]Worthy
- Doctoral advisor: Peter Schlosser
- Website: www.columbia.edu/~dth2/

David T. Ho is an American scientist who works as a professor at the University of Hawaiʻi at Mānoa. He is known for his work on air-sea gas transfer, mangrove carbon cycling, tracer oceanography, and ocean-based carbon dioxide removal (CDR). His article in the magazine Nature about how to think about the role of CDR is the most widely read writing on CDR by far, having been downloaded more than a hundred and four thousand times. He is often quoted in the media on CDR and climate change, and was recommended by the New York Times as a climate scientist to follow on social media.

Ho also created the Bamboo Bike Project, with John Mutter in 2006, which has spurred growth in the number of groups and companies creating bamboo bicycles around the world.

== Academic background ==
Ho obtained his A.B. in Environmental Science and Philosophy from Columbia College, Columbia University and M.A., M.Phil. and Ph.D. (with distinction) in Earth and Environmental Sciences from the Graduate School of Arts and Sciences, Columbia University in New York. He was awarded the Bruce C. Heezen Memorial Prize for outstanding academic and research achievement in the Earth Sciences while at Columbia.

== Career ==
After a short postdoc at Princeton University, Ho returned to the Lamont–Doherty Earth Observatory (LDEO) of Columbia University as the Storke-Doherty Lecturer and continued his research there until 2008, when he moved to the University of Hawaii at Manoa. Ho was also Chief Scientist on the Southern Ocean Gas Exchange Experiment, a multi-agency funded effort to study air-sea gas exchange in the Southern Ocean. He has published over 80 research papers.

In addition to being a professor at University of Hawaiʻi at Mānoa, Ho is also a Visiting Faculty in the School of Ocean Futures at Arizona State University, and was a co-founder and Chief Science Officer of [C]Worthy, a non-profit research organization that worked on building the tools needed to ensure safe, effective ocean-based CDR, an Adjunct Senior Research Scientist in Geochemistry at Columbia University, and an invited professor in the Department of Geosciences at the École normale supérieure in Paris.

Ho is also a member of the US OCB’s Ocean-Atmosphere Interaction Subcommittee, a member of the Scientific Steering Group of the World Climate Research Programme’s Lighthouse Activity on Climate Intervention Research, and a Lead Author of the 2027 IPCC Methodology Report on Carbon Dioxide Removal Technologies, Carbon Capture, Utilization, and Storage.

== Bamboo Bike Project ==
Ho started the Bamboo Bike Project together with earth science professor John Mutter, and bicycle maker Craig Calfee. They brought simple, low-cost bicycle designs primarily made of bamboo to Ghana, teaching local craftsmen to build them. The aim was to contribute to poverty reduction by facilitating locally made affordable transportation. They planned to implement the project in African Millennium Villages, as part of the UN Millennium Development Goals. In 2007 he received seed funding for the project from Columbia's Earth Institute.
