= Catharina Elisabeth Goethe =

Mother of Johann Wolfgang Goethe (1731–1808)

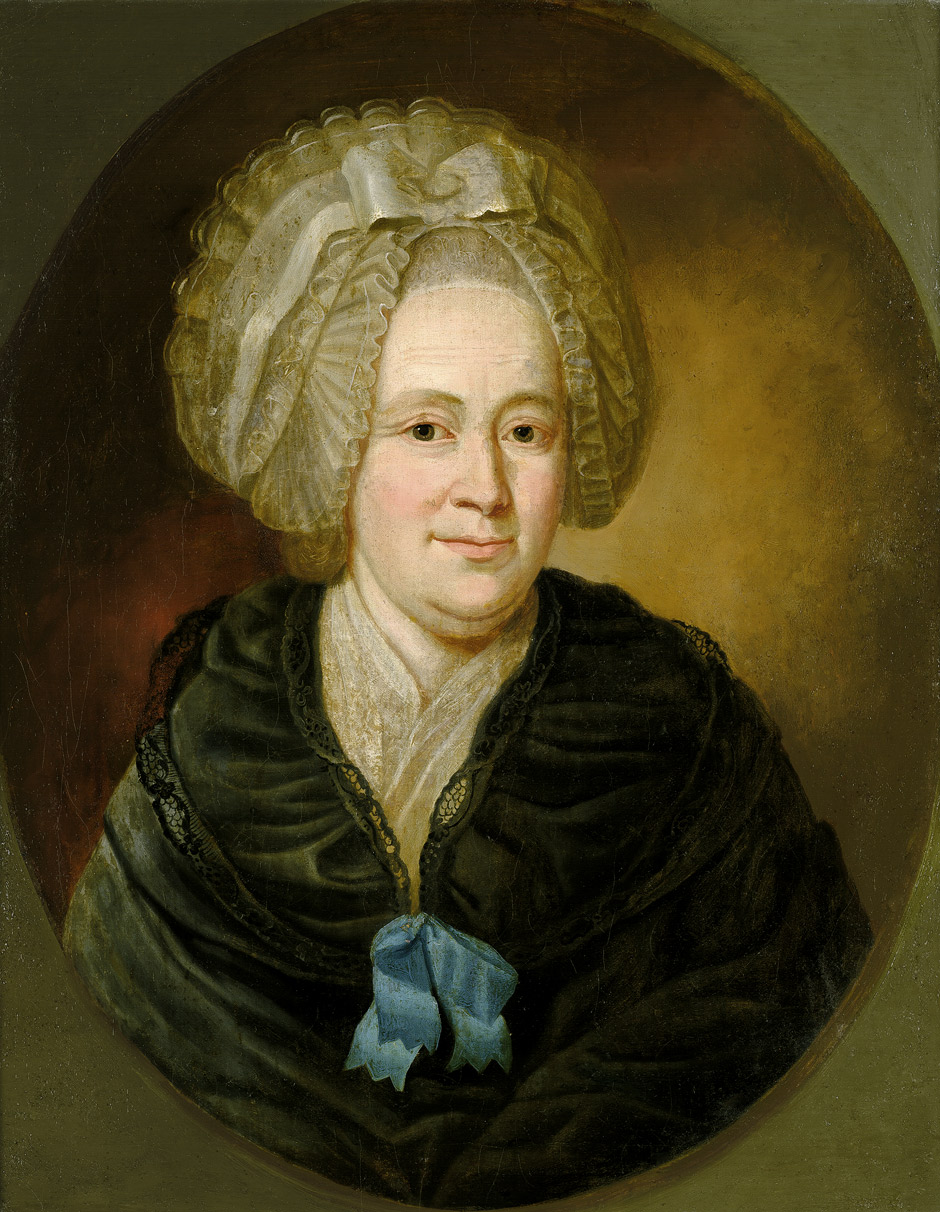
- Born: Catharina Elisabeth Textor; 19 February 1731; Frankfurt
- Died: 13 September 1808 (aged 77); Frankfurt
- Spouse: Johann Caspar Goethe
- Children: Johann Wolfgang von Goethe; Cornelia Schlosser

Catharina Elisabeth Goethe, born Catharina Elisabeth Textor, (19 February 1731 – 13 September 1808) was the mother of German playwright and poet Johann Wolfgang von Goethe and his sister Cornelia Schlosser. She was also known by the nickname Frau Aja and the title Frau Rat.

== Biography ==
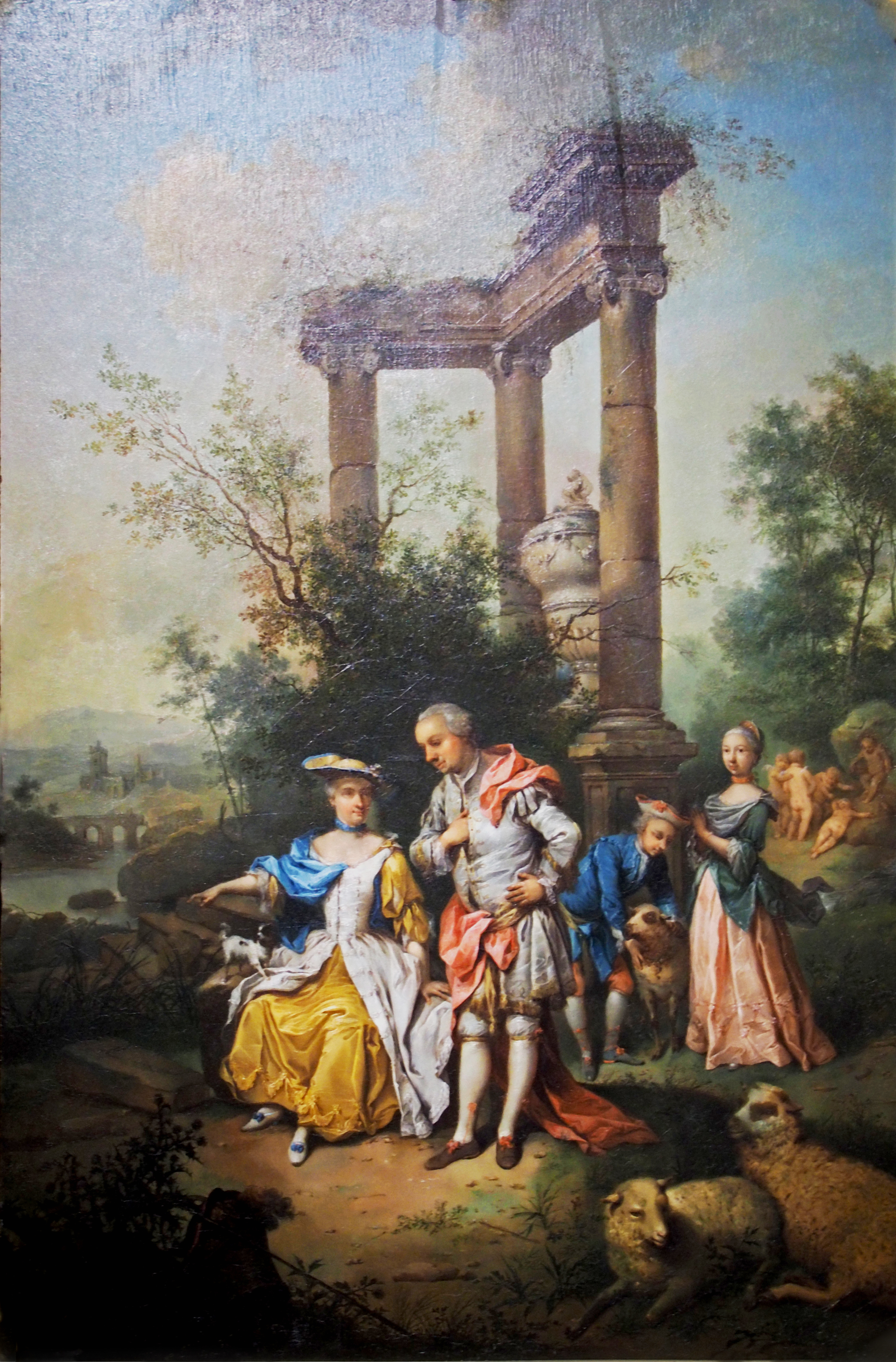
A painting of the Goethe family; left to right: Catharina Elisabeth, Johann Caspar, Johann Wolfgang, Cornelia. The cherubs in the background represent the five children who died before adulthood.

Catharina Elisabeth was born to Johann Wolfgang Textor and Anna Margaretha Lindheimer, daughter of lawyer Cornelius Lindheimer and his wife Elisabeth Catharina Lindheimer (née Seip), on 19 February 1731. She had eight siblings, four of whom survived, including politician and lawyer Johann Jost Textor.

She married Johann Caspar Goethe, who was 21 years older than her, on 20 August 1748, after which she moved into his house on Großer Hirschgraben. Three months later, she became pregnant aged 18, and her son Johann Wolfgang was born at the house on 28 August 1749. Goethe was soon pregnant again, and gave birth to her second child, Cornelia, on 7 December 1750. 5 more children followed, but none survived to adulthood. After the death of Georg Adolf in 1761, the Goethes did not try for any more children; each birth posed a great risk to both the mother and child. Catharina Elisabeth's role in the Goethe household primarily involved looking after her children; the Goethes had a servant, a cook and two maids who did most of the household tasks.

Catharina Elisabeth was a pietist and did not often attend church, preferring the conventicle of the pietists instead.

In 1774, Johann Wolfgang published The Sorrows of Young Werther, which brought him great fame, and thus many guests came to visit the Goethe household. Catharina Elisabeth revelled in caring for these guests. In 1775, Goethe moved to Weimar, but the Goethe House in Frankfurt still remained a popular spot to visit, with guests wanting to meet the mother of the famed playwright. Many of these guests became correspondents of Catharina Elisabeth, such as Duchess Anna Amalia of Brunswick-Wolfenbüttel and Bettina von Arnim.

Johann Caspar became ill in 1780 and died in 1782, after which Catharina Elisabeth occupied their house alone. She sold the house in 1795 and moved into an apartment on Frankfurt's Roßmark, in which she lived until her death on 13 September 1808. Goethe was buried at the Textor family grave in the Peterskirchhof in Frankfurt.

== Legacy ==
She is the heroine of Bettina von Arnim's Dies Buch gehört dem König (1843), and is one of the central figures of Karl Gutzkow's play Der Königsleutnant.

To celebrate the 100th anniversary of her death, a marble statue was erected of Catharina Elisabeth in the Palmengarten, showing her playing with the young Johann Wolfgang.

In 1876, the first secondary school for girls in Frankfurt, the Elisabethenschule, was named after Catharina Elisabeth.

== Bibliography ==
- von Gersdorff, Dagmar (2015). Goethes Mutter (in German) (5th ed.). Frankfurt: Insel Verlag. ISBN 978-3-458-34625-8.
- Hopp, Doris; Bunzel, Wolfgang (2008). "Catharina Elisabeth Goethe, geb. Textor (1731-1808). Eine kurze Biographie". Catharina Elisabeth Goethe (in German). Frankfurt: Freies Deutsches Hochstift. ISBN 978-3-9811109-5-1.
- Jung, Rudolf (1902). Das Goethe-Haus in Frankfurt am Main (in German).
- Lübbecke, Fried (1946). Frankfurt am Main. Goethes Heimat (in German). Frankfurt: Verlag Dr. Waldemar Kramer.
