= August von Goethe =

Son and personal secretary of Johann Wolfgang von Goethe

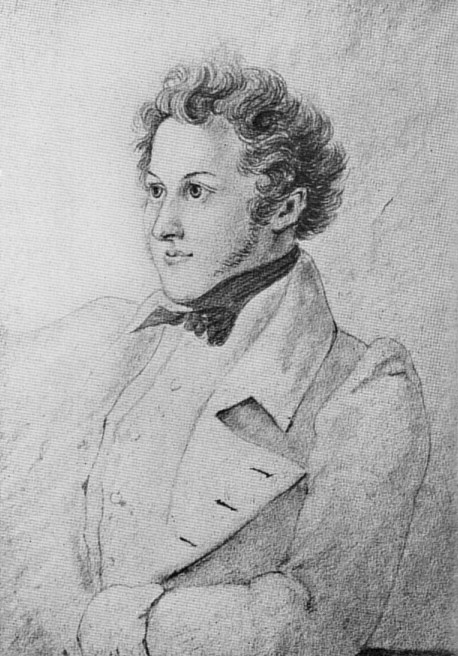
August von Goethe, portrait by Julie von Egloffstein

Julius August Walther von Goethe (25 December 1789 – 27 October 1830) was the only one of the five children of Johann Wolfgang von Goethe and Christiane Vulpius to survive into adulthood.

== Biography ==
He was born in Weimar and served at the court of Karl August, Grand Duke of Saxe-Weimar-Eisenach.

He studied law 1808-1809 at the Ruprecht Karls Universität Heidelberg. After that brief period, his primary employment was as a kind of personal secretary to his father. He accompanied him on his frequent trips and kept his travel diary. Like his parents, he had a penchant for alcohol, but unlike them, he had a tendency to be melancholic.

At the age of 27, he married Ottilie von Pogwisch (1796–1872) on 17 June 1817 in Weimar. Although the marriage proved difficult, the couple had three children: Walther von Goethe (1818–1885), Wolfgang Maximilian von Goethe (1820–1883) and Alma Sedina Henriette Cornelia von Goethe (1827–1844).

In 1830, he undertook a trip to Italy with his father's friend Johann Peter Eckermann. They traveled by way of Frankfurt, Lausanne, and Milan, where Eckermann became ill and returned home. August traveled on to La Spezia, where he had an accident and was injured. He nevertheless traveled on to Rome, where he died of smallpox on the night of 26–27 October 1830.

== Bibliography ==
- Karl von Holtei: Goethe und sein Sohn: Weimarer Erlebnisse in den Jahren 1827–1831. Vera-Verlag, Hamburg 1924
