= Johann Ludwig Ernst Morgenstern =

German painter (1738–1819)

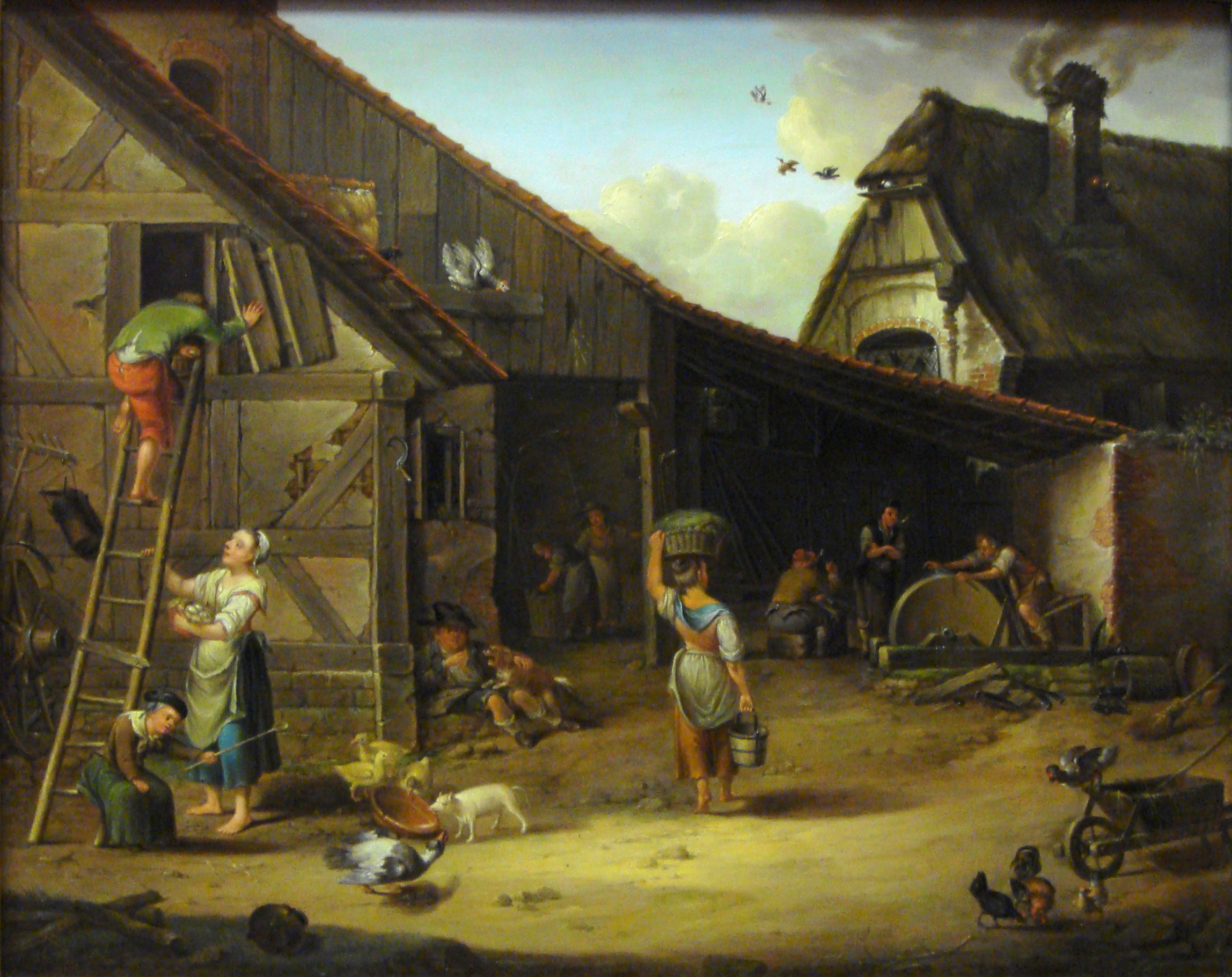
Bauernhof by Morgenstern, 1794

Johann Ludwig Ernst Morgenstern (22 September 1738 – 13 November 1819) was a German painting-restorer, etcher and painter.

== Life ==
Morgenstern was a student of his father, Johann Christoph Morgenstern (1697-1767), who was a valet and portrait-painter in the service of the princes of the House of Schwarzburg-Rudolstadt. His brother, Friedrich Wilhelm Christoph Morgenstern, was born in 1739 and later followed his father in his position. The siblings are the second in a total of five generations in this artist family, with Johann Ludwig Ernst being the first to leave their Thuringian homeland.

Already in his youth he drew horses and battle scenes after copperplate engravings of Georg Philipp Rugendas with such talent that his father was able to give only little support. From 1766 he attended the Academy of the Picture Gallery in Salzdahlum, where he worked under Ludwig Wilhelm Busch (1703-1772). This path led him to Hamburg in 1768, where he restored paintings, and to Frankfurt am Main in 1769, where he found himself admitted into the workshop of Christian Georg Schütz the Elder. After three years in Darmstadt, he returned again to Frankfurt in 1772.

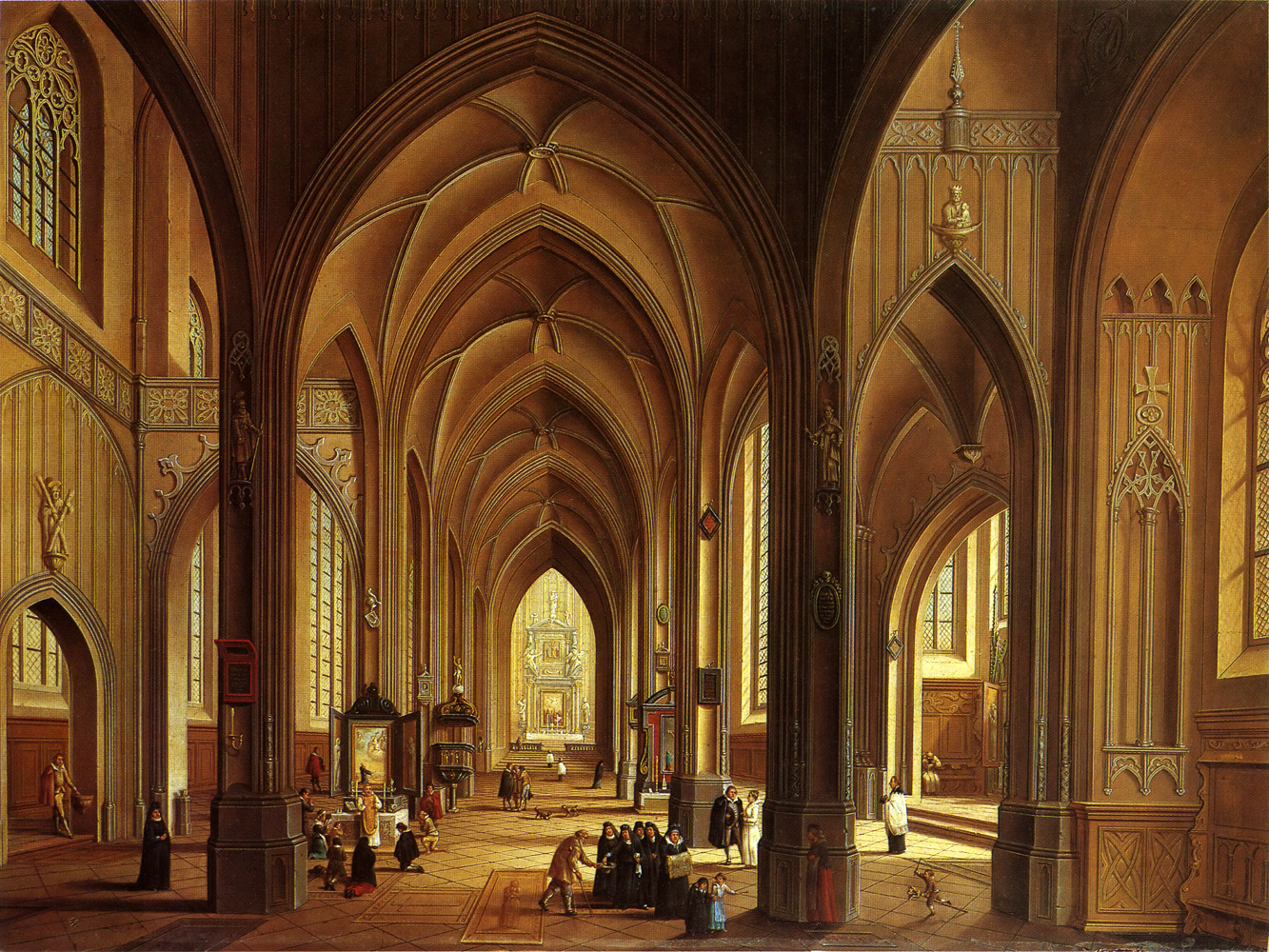
Interior of a Gothic Church, 1793, Frankfurt am Main

His original plan of going to Utrecht was dashed when he gained entry into the studio of Johann Andreas Benjamin Nothnagel (1729-1804), where for several years he was active in the fields of landscape, horse, and genre painting. Through his previous teacher Schütz, in this time he became acquainted with the Swiss architecture painter Johann Vögelin. He grew so enthusiastic in this genre that, from this time on, Morgenstern almost exclusively occupied himself in this niche of painting, primarily paintings of churches.

Through his marriage to Anna Maria Alleinz, Morgenstern obtained civil rights in Frankfurt on 17 September 1776; by transferring a masterpiece which represented the interior of a church, he simultaneously acquired master rights. His marriage produced a son, Johann Friedrich Morgenstern, born on 8 October 1777, who later also became a well-known painter.

Morgenstern remained active in his field until his old age; contemporary reports mention most of all, for a miniaturist, the extraordinary fact that he worked to the end without glasses. He died on 13 November 1819 at the age of 81; his grave at Peterskirchhof has not been preserved. The Frankfurt pastor and historian Anton Kirchner wrote his obituary, in which he recognized his constantly cheerful and contented disposition.

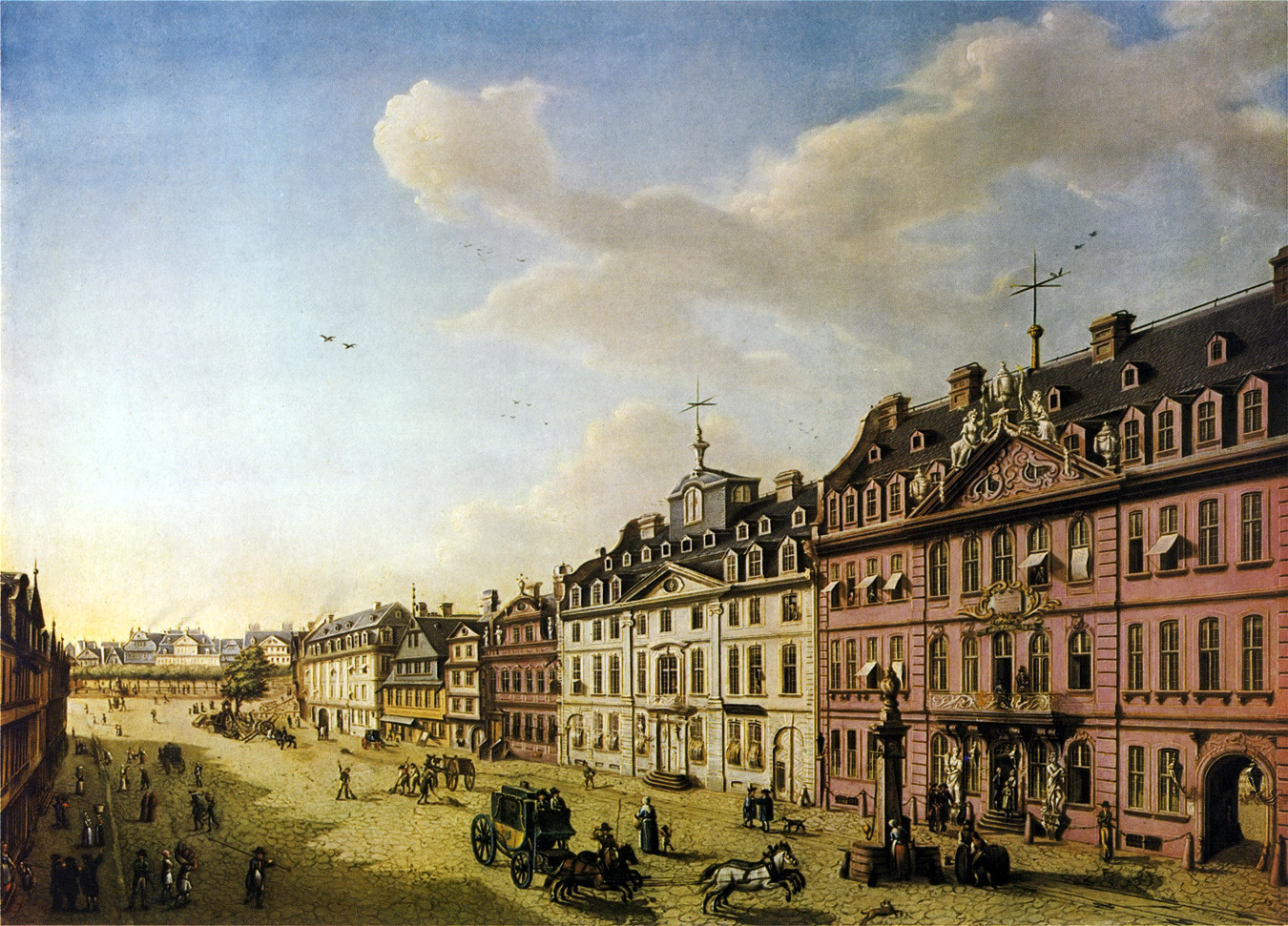
Northern side of the Zeil from the Red House to the Weidenhof

== Works ==
In his early years, Morgenstern worked as a painter of battle scenes and landscapes; in his later and more prolific years from 1780 to 1810 he mostly worked on church and building interiors in miniature form. The paintings of this period were captivating for their perfect perspective and colorful treatment, lighting, and their details. His corpus was primarily composed of oil paintings, seldom etchings, at first often on copper, which increased their brilliance.

His works often have, next to their artistic, immeasurable historic value as almost photographically exact representations of churches shortly before the turmoil of the French Revolution, which caused a secularization as well as a radical classical remodeling.

During his lifetime, Morgenstern's paintings, as Philipp Friedrich Gwinner noted in 1862, were "bought straight from the easel, as it were" for the best of prices, as often for local private collections as in foreign European countries. His works that are found in museum collections are mainly located in the museum in Frankfurt am Main.

Besides painting, he also occupied himself with restorations, which since his stay in Hamburg had been formed on important foundations. Over the years the skill of his hands reached that of the old masters: in the scope of his restoration work he frequently made small, private copies. He gradually put together a private, double-door cabinet of miniature oil paintings, which his son continued but which was only completed by his grandson Carl Morgenstern (1811-1893). The middle part of the cabinet contained 75, while the doors another 65, paintings. The Morgenstern Cabinet of Miniatures was sold to a Frankfurt art dealer in 1857 and around 1980 was bought and moved back to the Historisches Museum Frankfurt, although it no longer contains the original assortment of pictures.
