= Johann Daniel Bager =

German painter (1734–1815)

- Born: 1734; Wiesbaden
- Died: 1815 (aged 80–81); Frankfurt am Main
- Relatives: Justus Juncker (step-father)

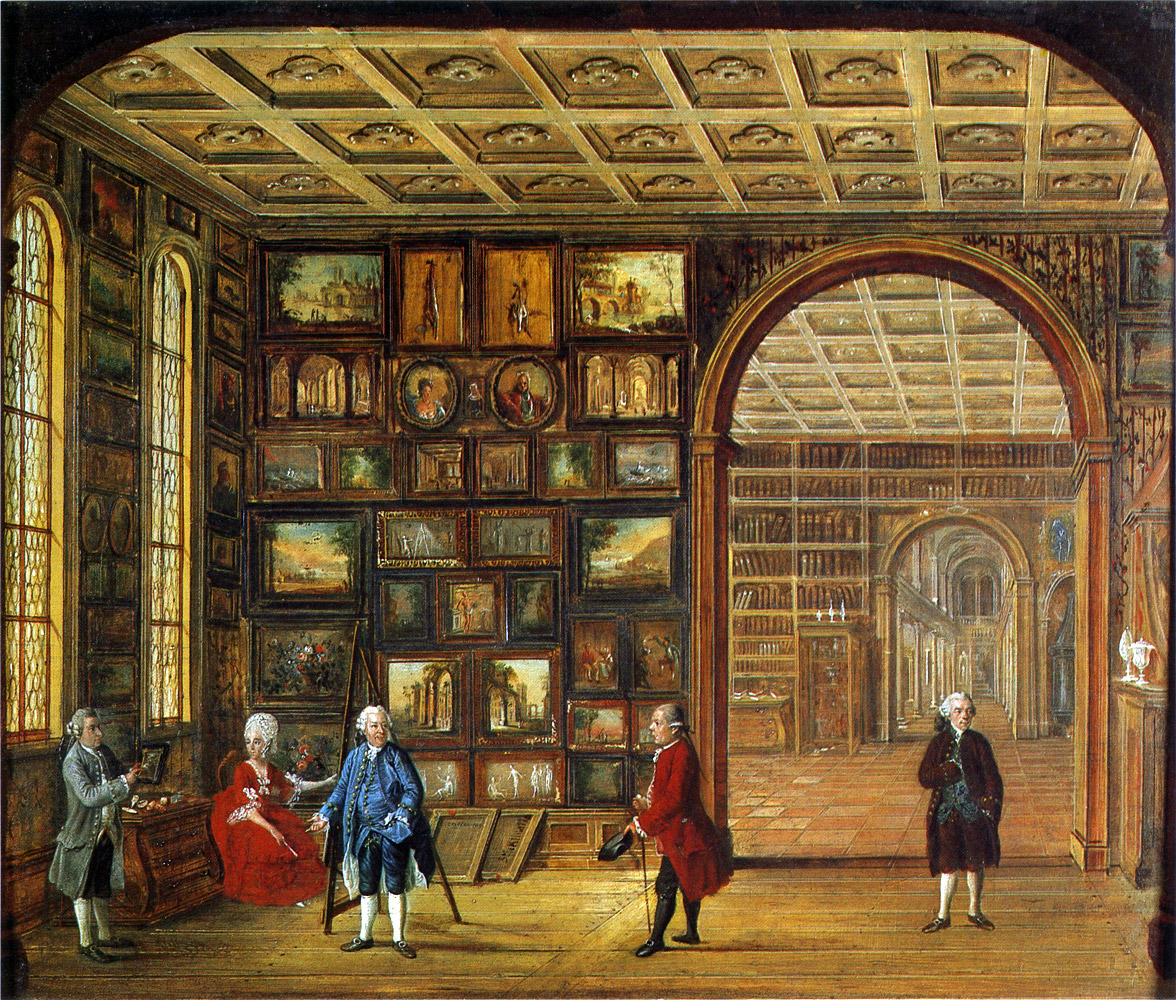
The painting collection of Johann Noë Gogel, painting from 1776.

Johann Daniel Bager, who was born at Wiesbaden in 1734, was a fruit and flower painter. He worked for some time at Frankfurt, where he died in 1815. Two works by him are in the Städel Gallery in that city. He was taught by his step-father Justus Juncker.

== See also ==
- List of German painters
