= Johann Caspar Goethe =

German lawyer (1710–1782)

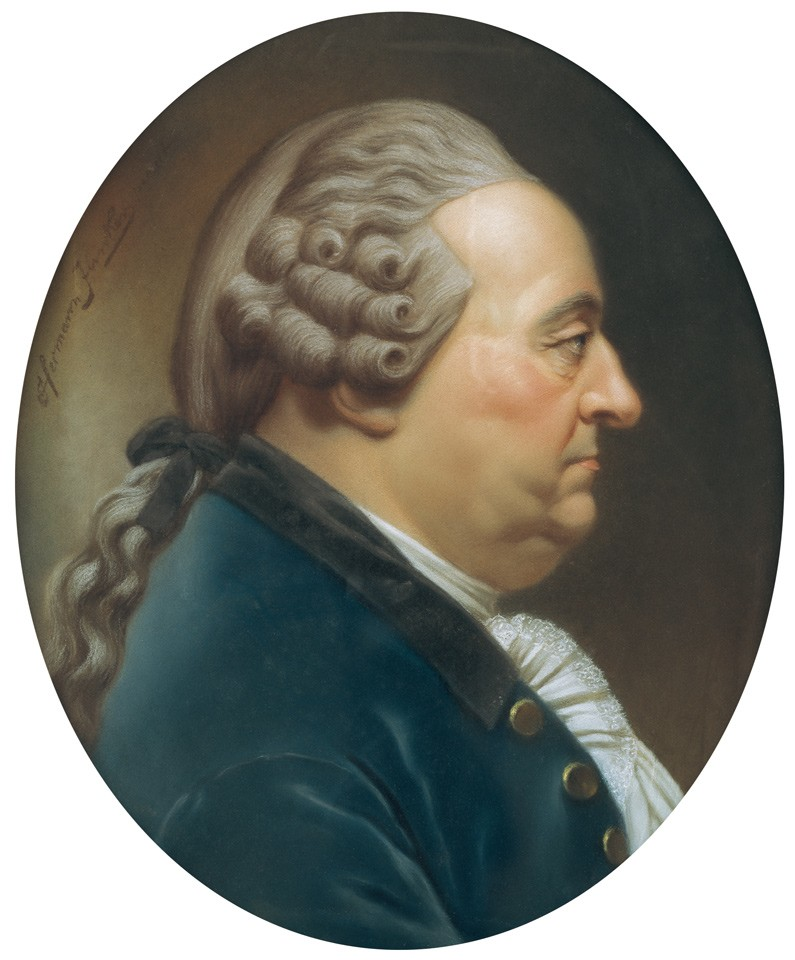
- c.1890 painting of Goethe
- Born: 29 July 1710; Free City of Frankfurt, Holy Roman Empire
- Died: 25 May 1782 (aged 71); Free City of Frankfurt, Holy Roman Empire
- Occupations: Jurist and royal councillor
- Spouse: Catharina Elisabeth Textor
- Children: Johann Wolfgang von Goethe; Cornelia Schlosser

Johann Caspar Goethe (29 July 1710 – 25 May 1782) was a wealthy German jurist and royal councillor to the Kaiser of the Holy Roman Empire. His son, Johann Wolfgang von Goethe, is considered one of the greatest German poets and authors of all time.

== Biography ==
Johann Caspar Goethe was born in Frankfurt in 1710 as the youngest son of Friedrich Georg Goethe (1657–1730) and Cornelia Walther (1668–1754). Between 1725 and 1730, Goethe attended the Casimirianum gynmnasium in Coburg, after which he studied law, first in Giessen and for four years from 1731 in Leipzig. In 1738, he was awarded a doctorate of both laws in Giessen. Goethe then worked at the Reichskammergericht in Wetzlar. He became acquainted with the workings of the Perpetual Diet in Regensburg as well as the Aulic Council in Vienna, both important institutions of the Holy Roman Empire.

Around 1740, Goethe undertook an educational tour of Italy about which he wrote a travel book in Italian titled "Viaggo per l'Italia" ("My Journey Through Italy" in English), in which he detailed the cities, buildings and objects he encountered on his travels. At the end of 1741, Goethe returned to his native Frankfurt, where he had owned two adjoining timber houses with his mother since 1733. He aspired to political office in Frankfurt, but was denied because his half-brother Hermann Jakob Goethe (1697–1761) was already a member of the council, and direct relatives were barred from holding office in the same city council.

In May 1742, Goethe paid 300 Guilder for the title of "Imperial Councillor" under Karl VII, who had lived in Frankfurt for much of his reign. The Kaiser held Goethe in high esteem, but died in 1745, leaving Goethe unable to pursue his desired career as an imperial diplomat.

Goethe lived the rest of his life as a private citizen. The income from his fortune allowed him to maintain his household without having to work. With the exception of a few excursions, Goethe did not leave Frankfurt for the rest of his life. On 20 August 1748, he married Catharina Elisabeth Textor. At the time of the marriage, Johann Caspar was 38 years old; Catharina Elisabeth was 17 years old.

Catharina Elisabeth moved into the Goethe family house after the marriage. It was here that their son, Johann Wolfgang, was born on 28 August 1749. Goethe had 5 other children, but only Cornelia, born in 1750, survived until adulthood.

After the death of his mother on 1 April 1754, Goethe had the two interconnected houses remodelled into a spacious new building with 20 rooms and a staircase modelled on the Kaisertreppe in the Römer. The new house provided sufficient space for Goethe's large library and art collection. When the house was sold in 1795, it was recorded that Goethe's library contained approximately 2000 volumes, amongst them legal and historical works, ancient and contemporary literature in several languages, travelogues and theological works. Goethe's art collection consisted entirely of contemporary works by Frankfurt artists; no inventory of the collection has survived. Goethe also collected plaster casts of antique sculptures as well as minerals.

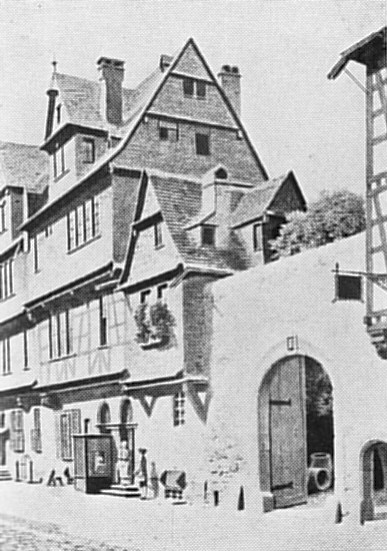
An artist's representation of Goethe's house before the 1755–1756 renovation.

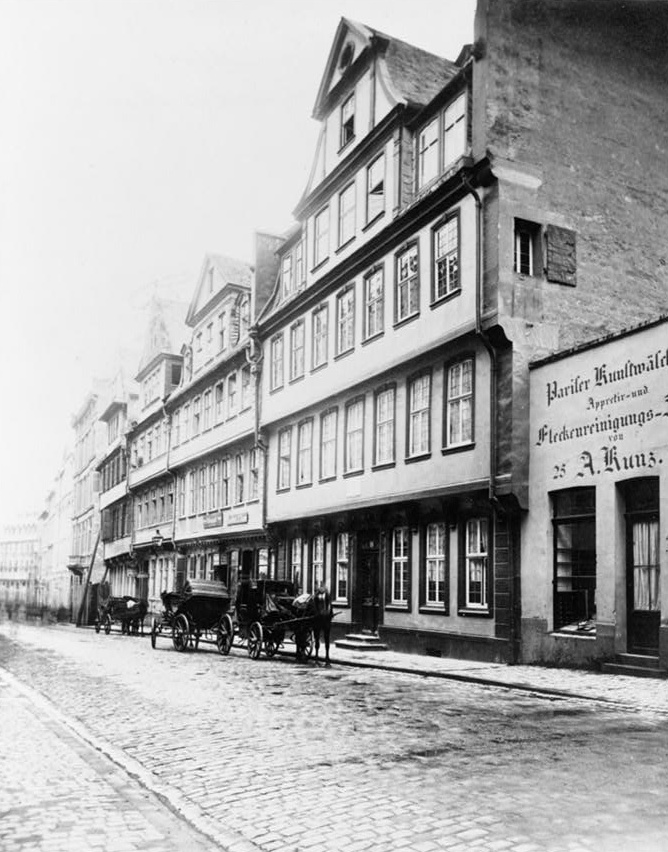
The completed house as it stood in 1850.

In 1759, French troops occupied Frankfurt during the Seven Years' War. The French city commander, Count Thoranc, stayed in Goethe's house for several months during this time. Goethe found this a nuisance, especially because he was a supporter of Prussia, France's enemy in the war.

After around 1770, Goethe gradually lost his mental faculties. In 1779, he suffered a stroke, followed by a second in 1780. Goethe was paralysed after this second stroke, and died on 25 May 1782. He left his son Johann Wolfgang a considerable fortune of around 90,000 Guilders. Goethe is buried in the family plot at the Peterskirchhof in Frankfurt.

== Brothers and sisters ==
Johann Caspar Goethe had five older half-siblings from his father's first marriage, and he also had three more siblings from his father's second marriage:

=== From the first marriage of his father ===
- Bartholomäus Goethe (1688–1696)
- Johann Michael Goethe (1690–1733)
- Johann Jacob Goethe (1694–1714)
- Hermann Jakob Goethe (1697–1761) – in 1722, married Susanna Elizabeth Hoppe (1704–1778), had seven children:
  - Anna Elisabeth Goethe (1724–1755)
  - Cornelia Goethe (1726–1799), in 1749 got married merchant Ulrich Thomas Streng (1712–1777), Among her sons was merchant Johann Ludwig Streng (1754–1817), among her descendants were the merchant Johannes Streng (1780–1843) and the mineralogist, chemist and geologist Johann August Streng (1830–1897), after whom the mineral Strengite was named.
  - Johann Friedrich Goethe (1728–1733)
  - Sofie Margaretha Goethe (1731–1761), in 1752, married an Evangelical Lutheran theologian, preacher and pastor Ehrenreich Reichard (1712–1788), had three sons:
  - Joachim Goethe (1732–1733)
  - Sabina Margaretha Goethe (1734–1798), in 1753, married Simon Friedrich Kistner (1722–1780) and had seven children.
  - Johann Caspar Goethe (1737–1742)
- Johann Nicolaus Goethe (1700–1705)

=== From the second marriage of his father ===
- Anna Sibylla Goethe (1706–1706)
- Johann Friedrich Goethe (1708–1727)
- Johann Georg Goethe (1710–1761) was married to Elizabeth Morgan (born 1712), had two sons.

== Writings ==
- Johann Caspar Goethe, Cornelia Goethe, Catharina Elisabeth Goethe: Briefe aus dem Elternhaus. ("Letters from the Parental Home"), First published in 1960.
- Johann Caspar Goethe: Viaggio per l'Italia (My Journey Through Italy), written in 1740 and first published in 1932. It was translated into German in 1986 under the title Reise durch Italien im Jahre 1740.

== Bibliography ==
- von Gersdorff, Dagmar (2015). Goethes Mutter (in German) (5th ed.). Frankfurt: Insel Verlag. ISBN 978-3-458-34625-8.
- Hopp, Doris; Bunzel, Wolfgang (2008). "Catharina Elisabeth Goethe, geb. Textor (1731–1808). Eine kurze Biographie". Catharina Elisabeth Goethe (in German). Frankfurt: Freies Deutsches Hochstift. ISBN 978-3-9811109-5-1.
- Lübbecke, Fried (1946). Frankfurt am Main. Goethes Heimat (in German). Frankfurt: Verlag Dr. Waldemar Kramer.
