= Peter Schlosser =

Professor and Earth scientist

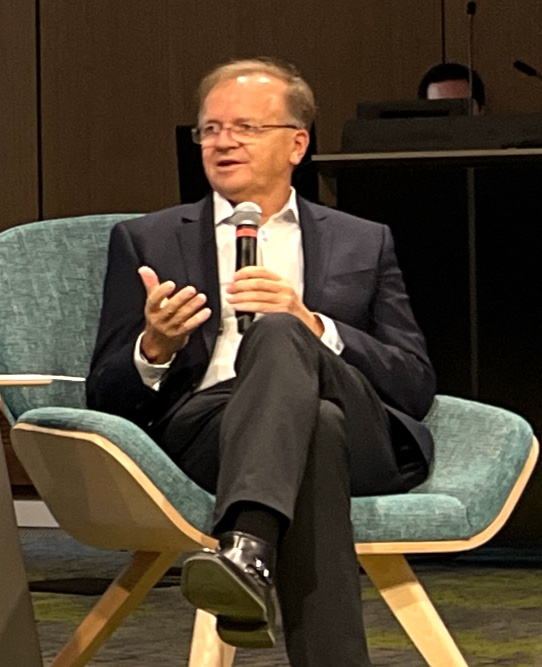
- Peter Schlosser on Earth Day, 2022
- Education: Heidelberg University - Master of Physics (1981), PhD in Physics (1985)
- Scientific career
- Fields: Oceanography, Hydrology, Air/Sea Gas Exchange, Continental Paleoclimate, Arctic Change, Sustainable Development
- Workplaces: Arizona State University; Columbia University; Heidelberg University; University of Washington-Seattle

Peter Schlosser is a German physicist, planetary scientist and academic administrator who currently serves as vice president and vice provost of Global Futures at Arizona State University. He is also a fellow of the American Association for the Advancement of Science (2011), the American Geophysical Union (2011), the German National Academy of Sciences Leopoldina (2016) and the World Academy of Art and Science (2023).

As vice president and vice provost, Schlosser oversees the research, academics and operations of the Julie Ann Wrigley Global Futures Laboratory and the College of Global Futures. He is also co-chair of The Earth League with Johan Rockström, director of the Potsdam Institute for Climate Impact Research. His research and teaching now focuses on planetary systems and options for healthy global futures.

== Education ==
Schlosser received a Master of Science in Physics from the University of Heidelberg in 1981, followed by a Doctor of Philosophy degree in physics from the same university in 1985. He conducted his thesis work in physics under advisors Wolfgang Roether and Karl Otto Munnich.

== Career ==
Schlosser specializes in water movement and variability for both groundwater and oceans, and has contributed to hydrology and environmental physics since the 1980s.

His academic career began in 1981 as a research assistant at the University of Heidelberg, becoming an assistant professor in the university's Institute for Environmental Physics in 1986. In 1989, Schlosser was named associate professor at Columbia University. He was promoted to full professor in 1993 and joined the Department of Earth and Environmental Sciences as well as being named senior staff to the Lamont-Doherty Earth Observatory. Schlosser was the Founding Chair of the Department of Earth and Environmental Engineering as well as the founding chair of The Earth Institute faculty, where he served as deputy director and director of research until 2017. During his tenure at Columbia University, Schlosser held the positions of Vinton Professor of Earth and Environmental Engineering and as the Maurice Ewing and J. Lamar Worzel Professor of Geophysics.

Schlosser moved to his current position at Arizona State University in 2018 where he was named vice president and vice provost of Global Futures and University Global Futures Professor. In 2019, he established the Julie Ann Wrigley Global Futures Laboratory.

== Field Research ==
In 1988, Schlosser and his colleagues established the first theoretical model for using the combination of tritium and tritiogenic helium for shallow groundwater dating. Schlosser's further work identifying isotopes and anthropogenic trace substances in groundwater, the Arctic Ocean, and Weddell Seas led to insights about human impact across planetary systems.

Schlosser has conducted research from the Arctic Ocean to the ice shelves of Antarctica. His field experience includes research conducted in the Atlantic Ocean (1979, 1981), Arctic Ocean (1987, 1991), Weddell Sea (1985, 1986), Southern Ocean (1990) and Hudson River (2001-2004). He has acted as co-chair of five of four Arctic Observing Summits (2013, 2014, 2016, 2018, 2020) and has been co-chair of the Science Steering Group, ISAC International Study of Arctic Change since 2010.

== Publications ==
Schlosser has published hundreds of articles in the fields of oceanography, hydrology, and paleoclimatolgy, among others, with Martin Stute, David Ho, and Bill Smethie being his most frequent co-authors. His work has been cited more than 16,000 times.

== Honors ==
- World Academy of Art and Science fellow (2023)
- Doctor Honoris Causa, Dimitrie Cantemir Christian University, Bucharest (2021)
- German National Academy of Sciences (2016)
- American Association for the Advancement of Science fellow (2011)
- American Geophysical Union fellow (2007)
- The Explorers Club fellow (2011)

== Memberships ==
- The Oceanography Society
- European Geophysical Union
- Arctic Institute of North America
- German Physical Society
- New York Academy of Sciences
- The Geochemical Society
- International Sustainable Development Research Society
