= Ottilie von Goethe =

German noblewoman and socialite (1796–1872)

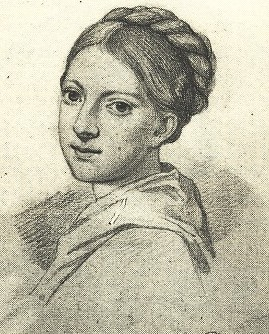
Ottilie von Goethe, drawing in chalk by H. Müller, after a pencil drawing by H. Junker.

Ottilie Wilhelmine Ernestine Henriette von Goethe (born Freiin von Pogwisch; 31 October 1796, Danzig – 26 October 1872, Weimar) was a German socialite and the daughter-in-law of Johann Wolfgang von Goethe.

== Biography ==
Her father, Wilhelm Julius Baron von Pogwisch (1760–1836), was of Holstein nobility, while her mother, Countess Henriette Ulrike Ottilie Henckel von Donnersmarck (1776–1851), came from one of the most prominent Silesian noble families. The parents divorced early and Ottilie lived with her mother in many different cities. She became a close friend for life of Adele Schopenhauer. Both were born in Danzig and grew up without a father.

Otilie was interested in Ferdinand Heinke, who finally became engaged to a different woman. Therefore, Ottilie agreed to marry August von Goethe (1789–1830), the only child of the famous poet. They married on 17 June 1817 and moved to Weimar, where they lived in the poet's house at Frauenplan. The couple had three children: Walther Wolfgang von Goethe (1818–1885), Wolfgang Maximilian von Goethe (1820–1883) and Alma Sedina Henriette Cornelia von Goethe (1827–1844). The marriage was unhappy because August was a drinker and Ottilie was attracted to other men. Also, her father-in-law was a dominant figure in their life.

Ottilie von Goethe called her father-in-law "father" and lived in his house for 15 years. The witty socialite attracted international guests and founded, in 1829, the journal Chaos. She also helped the famous writer finalise his eminent play Faust II. August died in 1830 in Italy, and the old Goethe two years later.

In 1835, Ottilie became the mother of a daughter, Anna Sibylla. The father was a British captain.

After Goethe's death, she lived in several cities. For her last two years, she stayed in Weimar. In 1872, she died because of heart failure. Her grave lies in Goethe's family tomb.

== Works ==
- Aus Ottilie von Goethes Nachlaß, 2 volumes. Weimar 1912–1913. Ed. Wolfgang von Oettingen;
- Erlebnisse und Geständnisse, 1832–1857. Klinkhardt & Biermann, Leipzig 1923. Ed. Heinrich Hubert Houben;
- Tagebücher und Briefe von und an Ottilie v. Goethe, 5 volumes. Bergland-Verlag, Vienna 1962–1979.

== Literature ==
- Bernhard Gajek (1964). "Goethe, Ottilie Wilhelmine Ernestine Henriette von, geborene von Pogwisch". Neue Deutsche Biographie (in German). Vol. 6. Berlin: Duncker & Humblot. pp. 575–576. (full text online).
- Max Hecker: Ferdinand Heinke in Weimar. In: Goethejahrbuch. 47, 1927, p. 251–306
- Karsten Hein: Ottilie von Goethe (1796–1872). Biographie und literarische Beziehungen der Schwiegertochter Goethes (= Europäische Hochschulschriften. Reihe 1: Deutsche Sprache und Literatur, Band 1782). Peter Lang, Frankfurt am Main u. a. 2001, ISBN 3-631-37438-0 (Dissertation Universität Düsseldorf 2000, 398 Seiten)
- Karsten Hein: Ottilie von Goethe. Einsichten in das Haus am Frauenplan. In: Andreas Remmel, Paul Remmel (Hrsg.): Goethe-Blätter. Schriftenreihe der Goethe-Gesellschaft Siegburg e. V. Band IV. Bernstein, Bonn 2008, ISBN 978-3-9809762-4-4.
- Ulrich Janetzki (Hrsg.): Ottilie von Goethe, Goethes Schwiegertochter. Ein Porträt. Ullstein, Frankfurt 1982, ISBN 3-548-30138-X
- Carmen Kahn-Wallerstein: Die Frau vom anderen Stern. Goethes Schwiegertochter. A. Francke, Bern 1948
- Elisabeth Mangold: Ottilie von Goethe. Böhlau, Köln 1965
- Ruth Rahmeyer: Ottilie von Goethe. Eine Biographie (= Insel-Taschenbuch, Band 2875). Erweiterte Neuauflage, Insel, Frankfurt am Main 2002, ISBN 3-458-34575-2
- Christina Ujma: Sehnsucht nach Italien – Ottilie von Goethe zwischen Weimar, Wien und Rom, in: Margaret C. Ives (Hrsg.) Women Writers of the Age of Goethe (= Occasional papers in German studies, Vol. 9). Lancaster University 1997, p. 81–121, ISBN 1-86220-034-3
- Emmy Wolff: "Chaos," in dies., Hg.: Frauengenerationen in Bildern. Herbig, Berlin 1928, p. 42–46.
