= Johann Georg Schlosser =

German lawyer, historian, politician, translator and philosopher

Johann Georg Schlosser (7 December 1739 – 17 October 1799) was a German lawyer, historian, politician, translator and philosopher. He is most known for having married Cornelia Schlosser, née Goethe, the sister of famous German playwright Johann Wolfgang von Goethe.

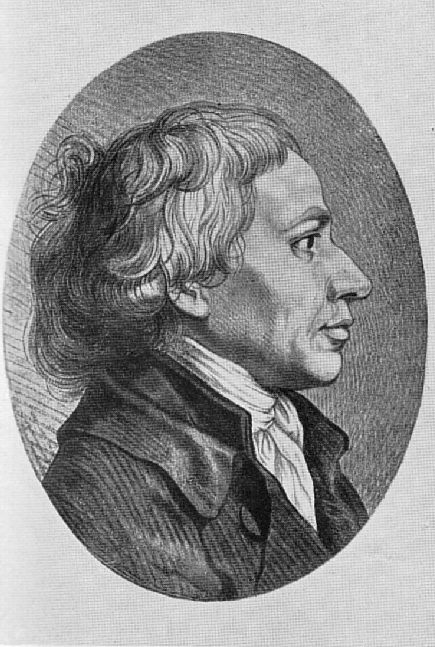
Copperplate engraving of Johann Georg Schlosser by Christian Erdmann Gottlieb Prestel (after 1785)

== Life ==
Johann Georg Schlosser was born in Frankfurt, the son of Carl Erasmus Schlosser, a lawyer and member of the city council of Frankfurt who came from an influential Protestant family, and Susanna Maria, née Orth, who came from a well-known merchant family. He had a brother, Hieronymus Peter, who, like his father, became a local politician.

During his school years, Schlosser showed an interest in classical languages and contemporary literature. In 1758, he began studying law at the University of Jena, later continuing his studies at the University of Altdorf. After he completed his studies in 1762, he returned to his hometown to become an attorney-at-law.

In 1766, he began working as a secretary for Frederick Eugen von Württemberg, who would later become the Duke of Württemberg, in Treptow an der Rega in Pomerania (now: Trzebiatów, Poland), where the latter was stationed as the general of a Prussian regiment.

In 1769, Schlosser returned to Frankfurt. In 1771, he published his first political and philosophical essays. His proposals stood in contrast to those advocated by the state and the church at the time, therefore making him well known among the country's enlightened intellectuals.

In 1773, he moved to Emmendingen, where he continued to publish his political and philosophical proposals, while working as civil servant at the Margraviate of Baden in Karlsruhe. In 1774, Schlosser began working at the Magraviate of Hochberg, where he was particularly committed to social and agricultural reforms. He also promoted mining and supported the construction of factories. In his reform efforts, he was frequently at odds with his sovereign, Margrave Karl Friedrich of Baden, and his government in Karlsruhe.

Shortly before moving to Emmendingen, Schlosser married Cornelia Goethe. The marriage was happy at first. However, Cornelia, who had received the same classical education as her brother, soon felt trapped in the small, provincial town of Emmendingen and in the role expected of her as a housewife and mother. On 28 December 1774 their first daughter, Maria Anne Louise, nicknamed Lulu, was born. Cornelia was in poor health following complications while giving birth. On 10 May 1777 their second daughter, Catharina Elisabeth Julie, nicknamed Juliette, was born. Cornelia died only four weeks later, on 8 June 1777, at the age of only 26.

In 1778, Schlosser married Johanna Fahlmer (1744–1821), daughter of a merchant and adviser Georg Christoph Fahlmer (1687–1759) from second marriage and a trusted friend of Goethe during his Sturm und Drang years. With her, he had another daughter, Cornelia Henriette Franziska, born 7 September 1781 and a son, Georg Eduard, born on 29 January 1784.

During his time in Emmendingen, Schlosser maintained contacts with fellow intellectuals and thinkers in southwestern Germany, Switzerland, and Alsace, including Johann Caspar Lavater, Isaak Iselin, Gottlieb Konrad Pfeffel and Jakob Michael Reinhold Lenz.

His scriptures were often controversial, as he again and again criticized the clergy, leading to some his writings being banned and even burned in Frankfurt. He was also frequently critical of the political decisions of his own superiors in the government.

Around 1782, Schlosser became a member of the Illuminati, where he was known under the names Dion, Mahomed and Euclides, and later also of the Freemasons, in both of which organizations he was active, in various positions and cities. During the 1780s, Schlosser frequently traveled to Switzerland and also spent some time in Vienna.

In 1787, Schlosser moved first to Rastatt, and then, in 1790, to Karlsruhe. Due to increasing conflicts with the markgravial government and his superiors, he was suspended from service in 1794. In 1793, his second daughter Juliette died at the age of 16 in Heidelberg. After a short stay in Ansbach, Schlosser moved to Eutin in northern Germany in 1796. There, his oldest daughter Louise married Georg Heinrich Ludwig Nicolovius (1767–1839), a Prussian official from Königsberg (now: Kaliningrad, Russia).

In Eutin, Schlosser worked as a scholar, conversing with fellow thinkers such as Johann Heinrich Voß or Friedrich Leopold zu Stolberg. During this time, Schlosser harshly criticized Immanuel Kant, one of the most influential philosophers of that time, describing Kant's philosophical ideas as out of touch with life, reason-heavy and ethically questionable. This led to him in turn being heavily criticized by Kant's followers, such as Friedrich Schlegel.

During his life, Schlosser also made a name for himself as a translator, translating works from authors such as Plato, Aristotle, Xenophon, Thucydides, Aeschylus, Euripides, Aristophanes, Homer and Kallimachos into German.

In 1797, he moved back to Frankfurt to once again become an attorney-at-law, eventually working for the city council, where he mostly dealt with the city's foreign policy. Schlosser died in 1799 at the age of 59.
