= Rudolf Schlosser =

German Quaker (1880-1944)

Rudolf Schlosser (4 April 1880 – 11 December 1944) was a German pastor, social worker and Quaker. As part of the Quakers, he helped people persecuted in Nazi Germany emigrate and escape.

== Biography ==
=== Early life and education (1880-1905) ===
Schlosser was born into a family of Lutheran pastors in Gießen. He had a brother named Hans and a sister named Grete.

In 1895, he started studying theology in Halle, Gießen and Marburg. After completing his studies, he worked as a volunteer for the Bethel Foundation.

=== Pastoral, political and welfare work (1905-1933) ===
In 1905, he began working as a vicar in Hesse. In 1910, he traveled to England for the first time as part of the Inner Mission to attend a meeting of the Young Men's Christian Association.

In 1914, during World War I, he was drafted into the German military, first as a medic, later switching to military service, before being discharged after being wounded.

In 1916, he started working as a pastor in Chemnitz. As a member of the SPD, he founded a nursery as well as a socialist working group. He was connected to a group of religious socialists surrounding Emil Fuchs.

As a pacifist, he started distancing himself from the German Lutheran church during this time because of the church's increasingly militarist stance.

He became the director of the municipal children's home in Chemnitz, which was an institution dedicated to helping troubled youths. In 1926, he started working in a similar position in a facility near Lübeck. In 1928, he moved back to Saxony, starting to work in yet another similar facility in Bräunsdorf.

In 1931, he joined the Quakers at their annual meeting in Dresden, having come into contact with them both through acquaintances from the religious socialists, as well as through meeting Quakers from abroad who lived in Chemnitz. His wife also became a Quaker in 1933.

=== Work for Quaker Bureau in Frankfurt (1933-1939) ===
Due to his political work, Schlosser was dismissed from his position in Bräunsdorf shortly after the Nazis seized power in 1933. He was also taken into protective custody for a short time.

After being released, he started working for the Quakers. Among other things, he was involved in the founding of a Quaker school in Eerde, which later became a school for children who had escaped persecution from Nazi Germany, for an instance via the Kindertransporte.

In July 1933, Schlosser and his wife moved to Frankfurt, becoming part of a small circle of Quakers who started providing help in secret to people trying to escape Nazi Germany. He also organized lectures for the group, which included speakers such as Wilhelm Mensching, a pastor who was later given the title Righteous Among the Nations by the Israeli memorial site Yad Vashem for saving the life of a Jewish woman by hiding her, or Gustav Radbruch. He was also in close contact with Martin Buber, whom he brought in contact with Bertha Bracey.

In 1936, Schlosser attended the annual meeting of the Dutch Quakers as a delegate. In 1937, he received a scholarship to study at the Woodbrooke Quaker Study Centre for a semester.

Upon returning to Germany, the political work of the Quaker Bureau in Frankfurt became increasingly difficult due to the surging repression and the constant threat of the Gestapo. Following the 1938 November pogroms, the group helped organizing the Kindertransporte, which were organized Bertha Bracey and Martha Wertheimer and in 1939, the emigration of other people who were tying to escape the Nazis. The activities of the bureau were mainly financed by Quakers from abroad, as well as donations from people who were not able to take all of their assets with them when they emigrated.

=== Activities during World War II and death (1939-1944) ===
With the outbreak of World War II, the bureau was unable to continue their work. Schlosser began working for the Red Cross, as well as working as a voluntary nurse in a hospital. After the hospital was bombed and destroyed in 1944, Schlosser was commissioned to travel to Gießen to help planning the rebuilding of the destroyed city. While it is unclear whether he traveled to Gießen in connection with this commission or whether he was trying to visit a friend, he was killed during an air raid on Gießen on 11 December 1944.

=== Personal life ===
Schlosser was married to Amalie Lehmann, with whom he had a biological daughter, Gertrud, who was born in 1908, as well as three adopted children.
