= Walther von Goethe =

German composer (1818–1885)

Walther Wolfgang von Goethe
- Freiherr
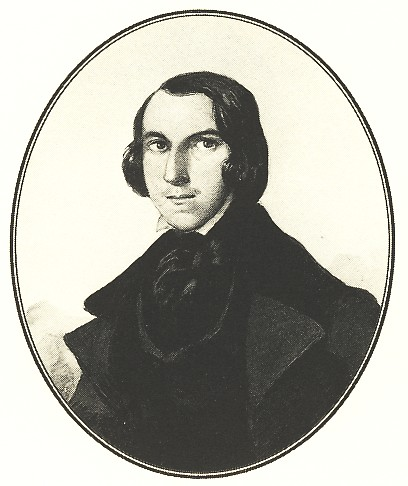
- Born: 9 April 1818
- Died: 15 April 1885 (aged 67)
- Father: August von Goethe
- Mother: Ottilie von Goethe
- Occupation: Composer, court chamberlain

Walther Wolfgang Freiherr von Goethe (9 April 1818 – 15 April 1885) was a German composer and court chamberlain. He was one of the grandsons and last living descendant of Johann Wolfgang von Goethe.

== Biography ==
Goethe was the eldest child of August von Goethe (1789–1830) and Ottilie von Goethe (1796–1872). He was always frail when he grew up and did not attend public school. He had his first music lesson when he was fifteen with the Weimar Kapellmeister Karl Eberwein. Later, Felix Mendelssohn Bartholdy taught him to play the piano, because he showed musical talent. He achieved little success with his songs and operas, weighted down by his name. In 1825, Weimar City Council awarded him, his father and his brother civil rights of residence in Weimar in perpetuity.

Above all in 1842, he opposed the suggestion of the German Confederation to acquire the Goethe House in Weimar and the estate of the poet for the nation. He lived mainly in the attic of the Goethe House. In 1859, he and his brother were made Freiherr (Baron). In 1864, Goethe became a member of the Freies Deutsches Hochstift, the academic society which had purchased his father's childhood home in 1863.

Goethe died 1885 on a journey to Leipzig. As stated in his will, the Goethe House, together with the library and extensive collection, was bequeathed to the state of Saxe-Weimar-Eisenach. This allowed the Goethe Museum to be founded.

Goethe was the last descendant of the poet and, like his brother and sister, had no descendants. His gravestone states: "With him ends Goethe's dynasty, the name will last forever."
