= Jerusalemhaus =

House museum in Wetzler, Germany

Coordinates: 50°33′10.6″N 8°30′3.7″E

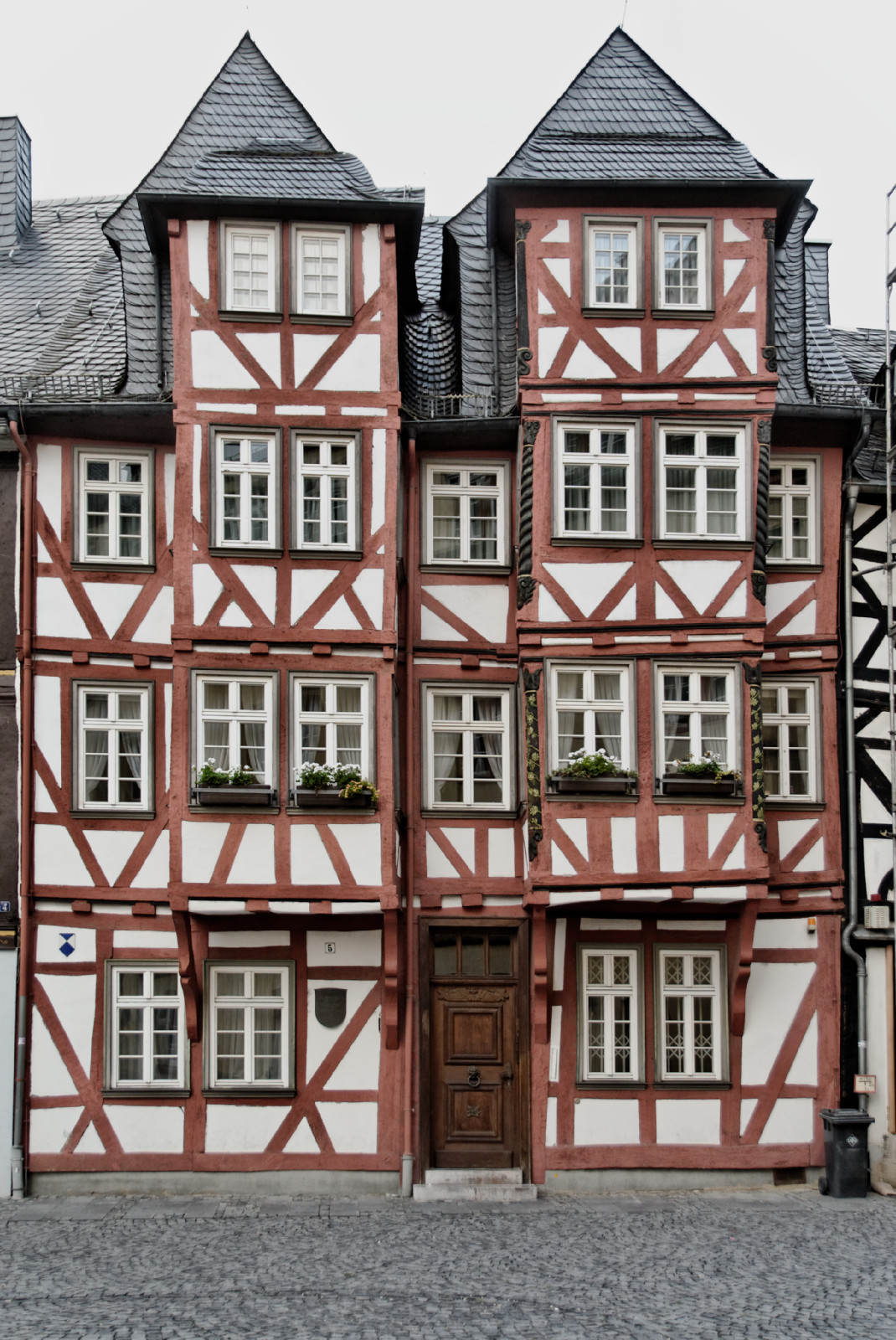
Exterior of the Jerusalemhaus.

The Jerusalemhaus is a house museum at Schillerplatz 5 in Wetzlar, Germany.

On October 30, 1772, the Braunschweig legation secretary Karl Wilhelm Jerusalem shot himself here in a two-room apartment on the second floor. Goethe, who knew him personally due to an internship they completed together at the Reichskammergericht in Wetzlar, immortalized Jerusalem as the suicidal "Werther" in The Sorrows of Young Werther (1774). The apartment is today a memorial equipped with historical furniture and documents.

The Jerusalemhaus houses the Goethe-Werther-Sammlung ("Goethe-Werther Collection"). The special library strives for maximum completeness in the documentation of Goethe's novel The Sorrows of Young Werther and not only keeps precious contemporary German editions of the novel, but also collects new editions in every conceivable language. Another museum in Wetzlar, the former home of Charlotte Buff, known as the Lottehaus, also has several editions on display.

The building is a cultural monument under the Hessian Monument Protection Act.
