= Ernst Guhl =

German art historian (1818–1862)

Ernst Karl Guhl
- Born: 20 July 1818; Berlin, Germany
- Died: 20 August 1862 (aged 44); Berlin, Germany
- Occupation: Art historian
- Employer(s): Akademie der Kunst, Friedrich-Wilhelms-Universität
- Known for: Die Frauen in der Kunstgeschichte, Denkmäler der Kunst

Ernst Karl Guhl (20 July 1818 – 20 August 1862) was a German art historian of the Berlin School of Art History (Berliner Schule der Kunstgeschichte). He focused on Ancient European, Ancient Greek, and Medieval cultures. He is noted as the first historian to write a study specifically on female artists.

== Biography ==
Guhl was born in Berlin to Adam Wilhelm Guhl and Wilhelmine Caroline Gehricke. He studied philology and archaeology as an undergraduate at the Friedrich-Wilhelms-Universität (now Humboldt University). Following the practice of other early art historians, Guhl traveled throughout Europe to study classical art and architecture, including a fifteen-month period of self-study in Italy from 1846 to 1847.

He served as a Privatdozent beginning in 1848 at the Friedrich-Wilhelms-Universität. His Habilitation, Versuch über das Ionische Kapitäl (A Study on the Ionian Capital), was published in 1848 as a contribution to the history of Greek architecture. He began teaching in the summer of 1848, offering a course on the history of modern painting and a private course on ancient architecture.

Guhl was hired in a temporary capacity to teach at the Akademie der Kunst in 1849; this appointment was made permanent in 1853. Between 1854 and 1858, he undertook four study trips to London, Paris, Spain, and Greece. Following a university-sponsored trip to Italy in 1861, he taught briefly at Berlin before succumbing to a brief illness. He died in Berlin at the age of 44.

== Academic career ==
Guhl was the only new instructor with a primary focus on the history of art to join the Friedrich-Wilhelms-Universität until the late 1860s. His colleagues included Eduard Gerhard and Theodor Panofka, Heinrich Hotho, and Gustav Waagen. In 1847, he joined historians compiling reference books on art history. He was assigned to write the descriptions for Denkmäler der Kunst, a picture book intended to accompany Franz Kugler's Handbuch der Kunstgeschichte. Beginning in 1851, he published Denkmäler der Kunst together with Wilhelm Lübke.

Despite his scholarly contributions, Guhl struggled to advance within the university. He applied for an extraordinary professorship four times between 1851 and 1858, but was unsuccessful. It is suggested that his broad focus as a scholar was viewed as problematic, or that the discipline of art history itself was not yet deemed deserving of that level of professorship at the time. He did, however, hold the position of professor and secretary at the Berlin Academy.

== Scholarship and methodology ==
Guhl's methodology was initially aligned with the "Berlin School of Art History" (Berliner Schule der Kunstgeschichte), which emphasized the use of documents and disciplined research procedures over anecdotal writing. However, his methodology shifted with his work Künstlerbriefe (Artists’ Letters), where he examined biographical data, moving away from the strict "Berlin School" approach. This method of using artists' letters to construct biography is evident in later biographies by Herman Grimm, Carl Justi, and Anton Springer.

In 1858, Guhl published Die Frauen in der Kunstgeschichte (Women in Art History), which was the first examination of female artists and women's roles in art. The American author Elizabeth F. Ellet borrowed heavily from this work—with some sources suggesting plagiarism—for her book Women Artists in All Ages and Countries, published the following year.

Guhl also collaborated with the philologist Wilhelm Koner (1817–1887) on Das Leben der Griechen und Römer, a book intended for a general audience.
