= Lottehaus =

Museum in Germany

Coordinates: 50°33′18.7″N 8°30′14.6″E

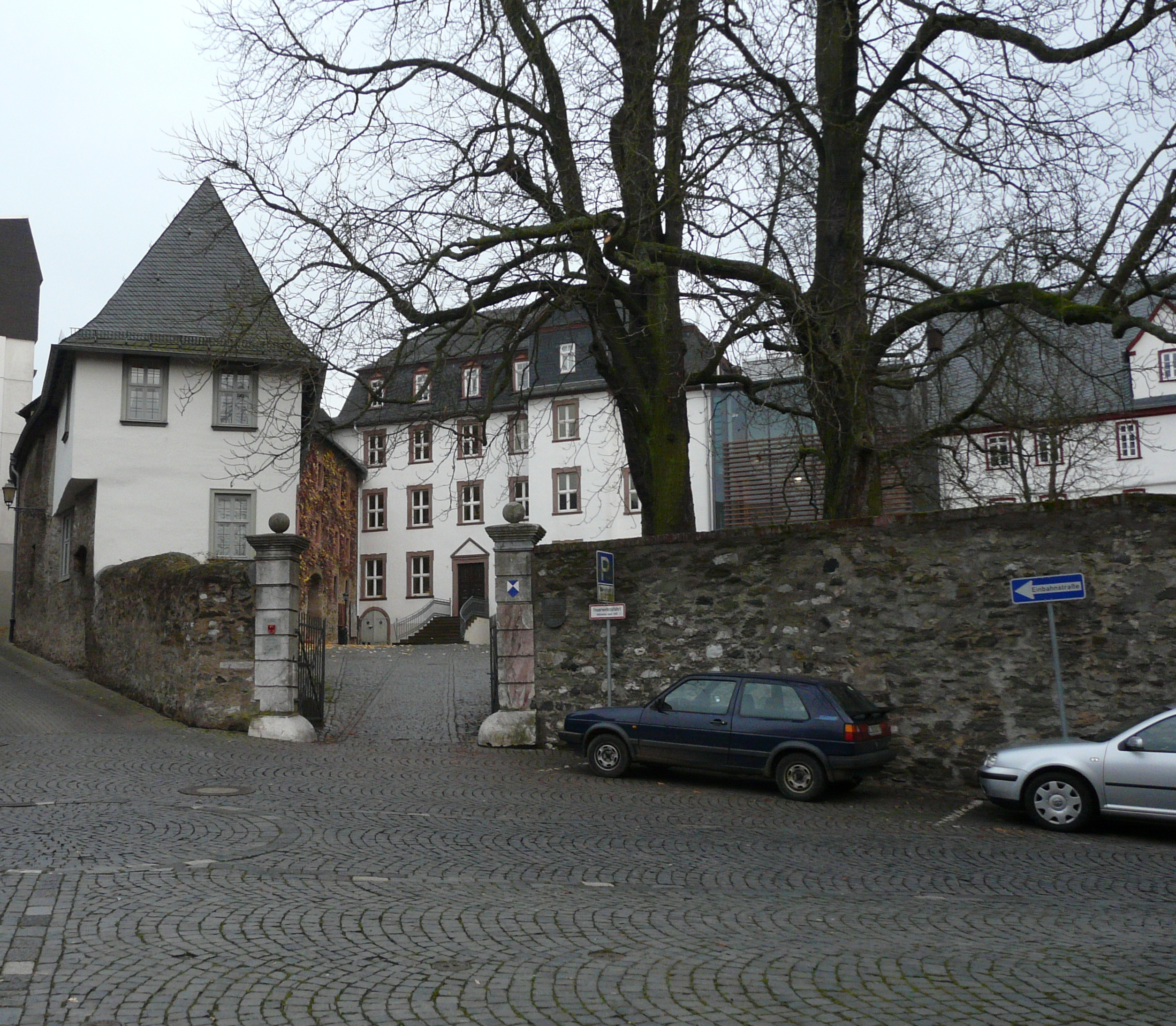
Lottehof, Lottestraße 8–10

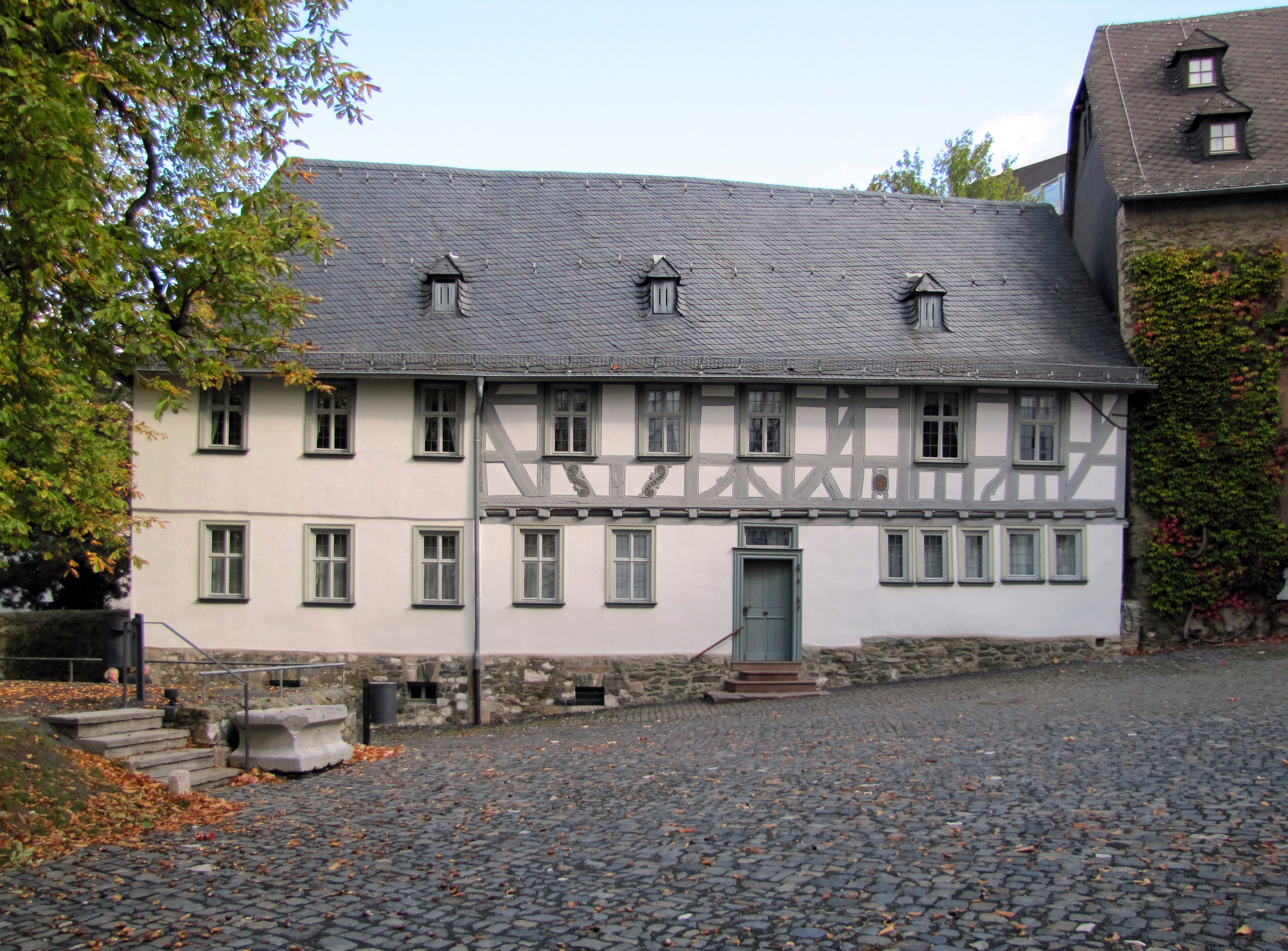
Das Lottehaus (2011)

The Lottehaus is a museum in Wetzlar, Germany. It was the birthplace of Charlotte Buff, who lived there for the first 20 years of her life until she got married.

The Lottehaus was originally an establishment of the Teutonic Order, which founded it in 1285 under the name Haus Wetzlar as its principal office in the city of Wetzlar. Over the years the establishment was extended by several buildings and the actual Lottehaus was constructed in 1653 to house the local curator of the order. Heinrich Adam Buff moved into the Lottehaus in 1740, when he started his work as curator for the order. His daughter Charlotte, after who the house is named today, was born in it on 11 January 1753 and to lived there for the first 20 years of her life until she got married in 1773. After Charlotte had become famous for being the inspiration for Johann Wolfgang von Goethe's novel The Sorrows of Young Werther the citizens of Wetzlar decided in 1863 to use the house as a memorial for her.

Today the Lottehaus is a part of the museums of the city of Wetzlar and contains a permanent exhibition. On display are furniture and various items illustrating life in the 18th century, some of which originally belonged to the Buff family. There are also three rooms devoted to the work of Goethe and in particular to the contemporary reception of his novel The Sorrows of Young Werther.

Another museum in Wetzlar containing material related to Goethe and Werther as well is the Jerusalemhaus.
