= Johann Christian Kestner =

German lawyer and archivist (1741–1800)

Johann Georg Christian Kestner
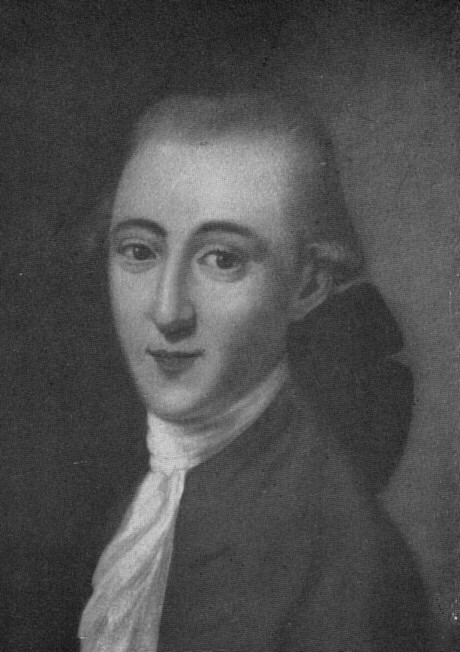
- Johann Georg Christian Kestner
- Born: 28 August 1741
- Died: 24 May 1800 (aged 58)
- Occupations: Lawyer, archivist
- Known for: Model for Albert in The Sorrows of Young Werther
- Spouse: Charlotte Buff (m. 1773)
- Children: Twelve, including Georg and August

Johann Georg Christian Kestner (28 August 1741 – 24 May 1800) was a German lawyer and archivist. He is also notable as the model for Lotte's husband Albert in The Sorrows of Young Werther by Goethe, with Kestner's fiancée Charlotte Buff used as the model for Lotte herself.

== Life ==
In the 18th and 19th centuries the Kestner family was one of the families at court (German: hübsche Familien). As a young Brunswick-Lüneburg legation secretary in the imperial chamber court (Reichskammergericht) in Wetzlar from 1767 to 1773, he met and became engaged to Charlotte Buff, a daughter of the bailiff of the local Deutschordenshof.

Goethe also worked at the same court during 1772 and got to know both Kestner and Buff. Goethe fell in love with Buff, nicknaming her "Lotte", even though she was already engaged. This love and Karl Wilhelm Jerusalem's suicide using Kestner's borrowed pistols were both used by Goethe in The Sorrows of Young Werther, which first appeared in 1774.

Buff and Kestner married in 1773 in Wetzlar and then moved to Hanover, where he became vice-archivist and privy councillor to the Hanoverian court. He and Buff had twelve children, with Goethe acting as godfather to the eldest son Georg, who followed his father as an archivist. Another son, August, was a diplomat and art collector. The family lived on the Aegidienstraße then on Großen Wallstraße (now known as Georgswall). Kestner died on a business trip to Lüneburg and his grave no longer survives. His and his wife's documents are now in the Stadtarchiv Hannover.

== Works ==
- Alfred Schröcker (ed.): Die wahre Brunnenfreiheit. Das Kurtagebuch des Johann Christian Kestner vom 9. bis 30. Juli 1765 in Bad Rehburg. Wehrhahn, Laatzen 2005, ISBN 3-86525-023-8.
- Alfred Schröcker (ed.): „Du bist ein Sterblicher!“. Gedichte des jungen Johann Christian Kestner (1760/61). Wehrhahn, Laatzen 2006, ISBN 3-86525-044-0.
- Alfred Schröcker (ed.): „Reise auf den Harz“. Tagebuch vom 24. Dezember 1763 bis 3. Januar 1764. Mit einem Nachwort von Alfred Schröcker. Wehrhahn, Hannover 2013, ISBN 978-3-86525-336-1.
- Johann Christian Kestner: Die Brockenreise. Tagebuch vom 10. bis 16. August 1789. Herausgegeben und kommentiert von Alfred Schröcker. Hannoversche Geschichtsblätter NF 69 (2015) S. 162–177.

== General references ==
- Anna Wendland: Die Handschriften des Kestnerschen Nachlasses in der Stadtbibliothek zu Hannover. In: Hannoversche Geschichtsblätter 11 (1908), S. 97–135.
- Siegfried Rösch: Die Familie Buff. Einblick in eine mehr als vierhundertjährige Familiengeschichte. Degener & Co., Neustadt an der Aisch 1953.
- Hugo Thielen: Johann Georg Christian Kestner. In: Hannoversches biographisches Lexikon. Von den Anfängen bis in die Gegenwart. Schlüter, Hannover 2002, ISBN 3-87706-706-9, S. 197.
- Rüdiger R. E. Fock: Die Kestner. Eine deutsch-französisch-schweizerische Familie macht Geschichte(n). Schnell Buch und Druck, Warendorf 2009, ISBN 978-3-87716-706-9.
- Alfred Schröcker: Johann Christian Kestner. Der Eigendenker. Eine Jugend in der Mitte des 18. Jahrhunderts. Wehrhahn, Laatzen 2011, ISBN 978-3-86525-184-8.
