= William Render =

William Render (fl. 1800), grammarian and translator, was a native of Germany. He was a fellow student at Giessen University with a brother of Charlotte (Werther's inamorata), and was well acquainted with Werther himself. In an appendix to his English version of Goethe's romance, Render relates a conversation he had with Werther at Frankfort-on-the-Main a few days before the latter's suicide.

Render was ordained to the Lutheran ministry. Subsequently he acted as 'traveling guardian to the son of a distinguished personage'. He then traveled in western Germany with 'several English gentlemen', one of whom may have been Francis, afterwards the Marquis Hastings, to whom, as Earl of Moira, he dedicated his Tour through Germany. Render came to England about 1790, and settled in London. He taught German and other languages 'in several families of distinction.' Towards the end of the century he also became 'teacher of German' at Cambridge, Oxford, and Edinburgh. In 1798 he published an English version of Kotzebue's play Count Benyowsky, which reached a second edition within the year.

In 1800, Render further translated The Robbers, Don Carlos, Maria Stuart, and The Armenian of Schiller. In the following year appeared his version of The Sorrows of Werther, the first translation into English made direct from the original German. In the preface he speaks of 'his friend the baron Goethe', whom he may have met at Frankfurt. Render's Tour through Germany, particularly along the Banks of the Rhine, Mayne, also appeared in 1801. A vocabulary of familiar phrases in German and English is annexed for the benefit of travelers. The remainder of Render's publications were educational manuals. The chief of these, A concise Practical Grammar of the German Tongue (1799), was very successful.

A fifth edition, corrected and augmented with improvements made by the Berlin Academy, was issued in 1817. As a token of his appreciation of the work, Alexander I of Russia ordered Woronzow, his ambassador in England, to present Render with a ring and an autograph letter. Render also published German Exercises, a Pocket Dictionary in English and German, and other manuals of instruction in German.
