= Karl Wilhelm Jerusalem =

German lawyer (1747–1772)

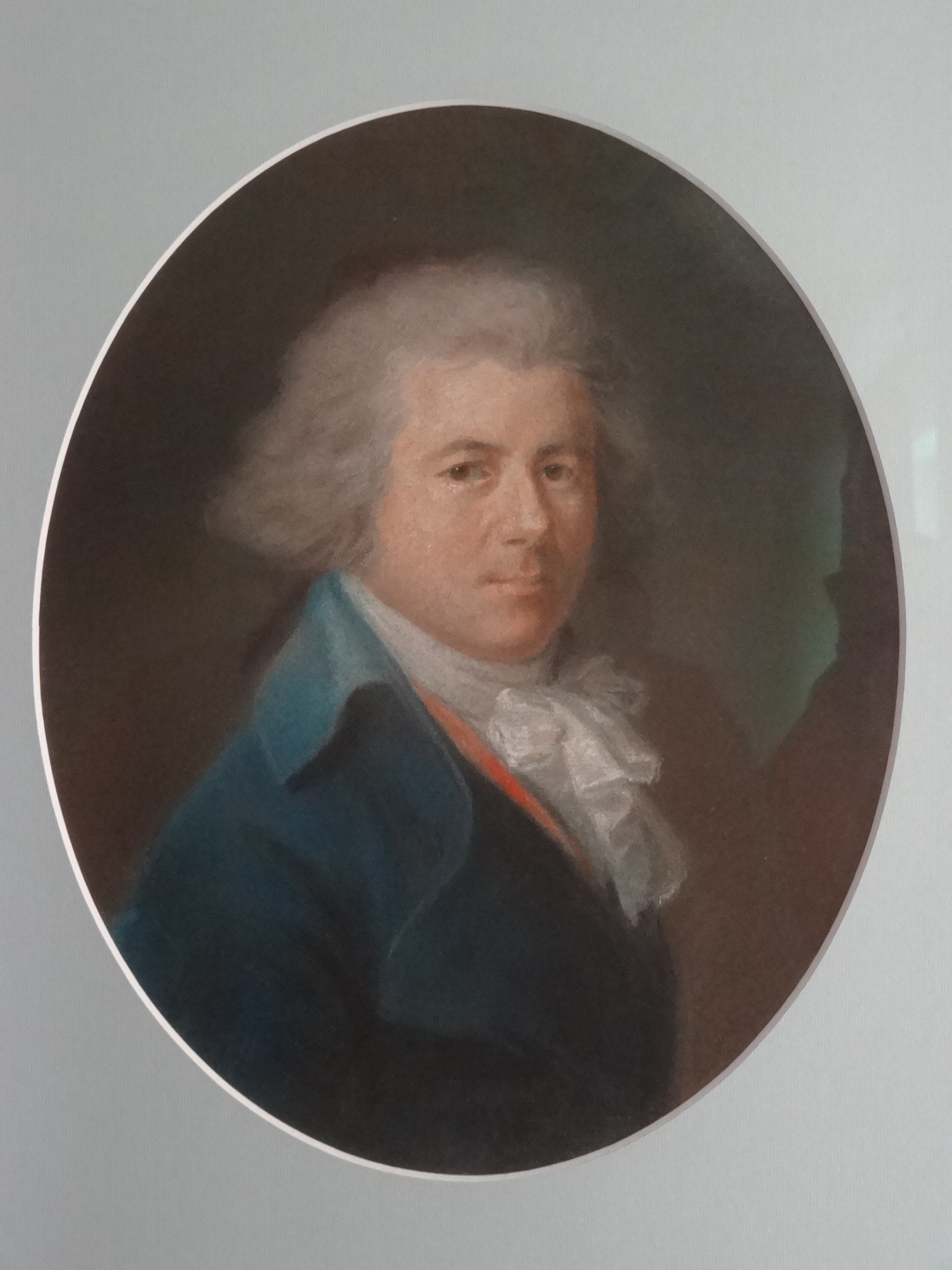
Carl Wilhelm Jerusalem

Karl Wilhelm Jerusalem (21 March 1747 – 30 October 1772) was a German lawyer. His suicide in Wetzlar became the model for that of The Sorrows of Young Werther by Goethe.

== Life ==
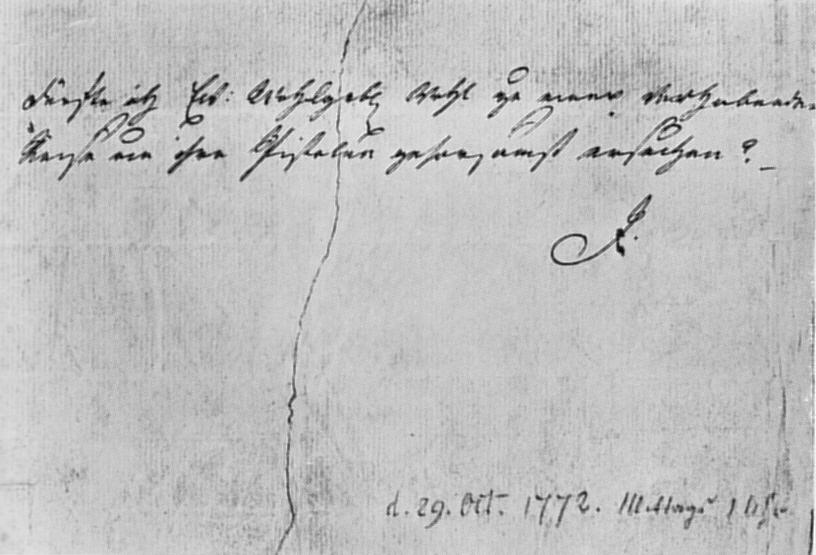
Jerusalem's note requesting Kestner's travelling pistols - the original is now in the Goethe- und Schillerarchiv in Weimar.

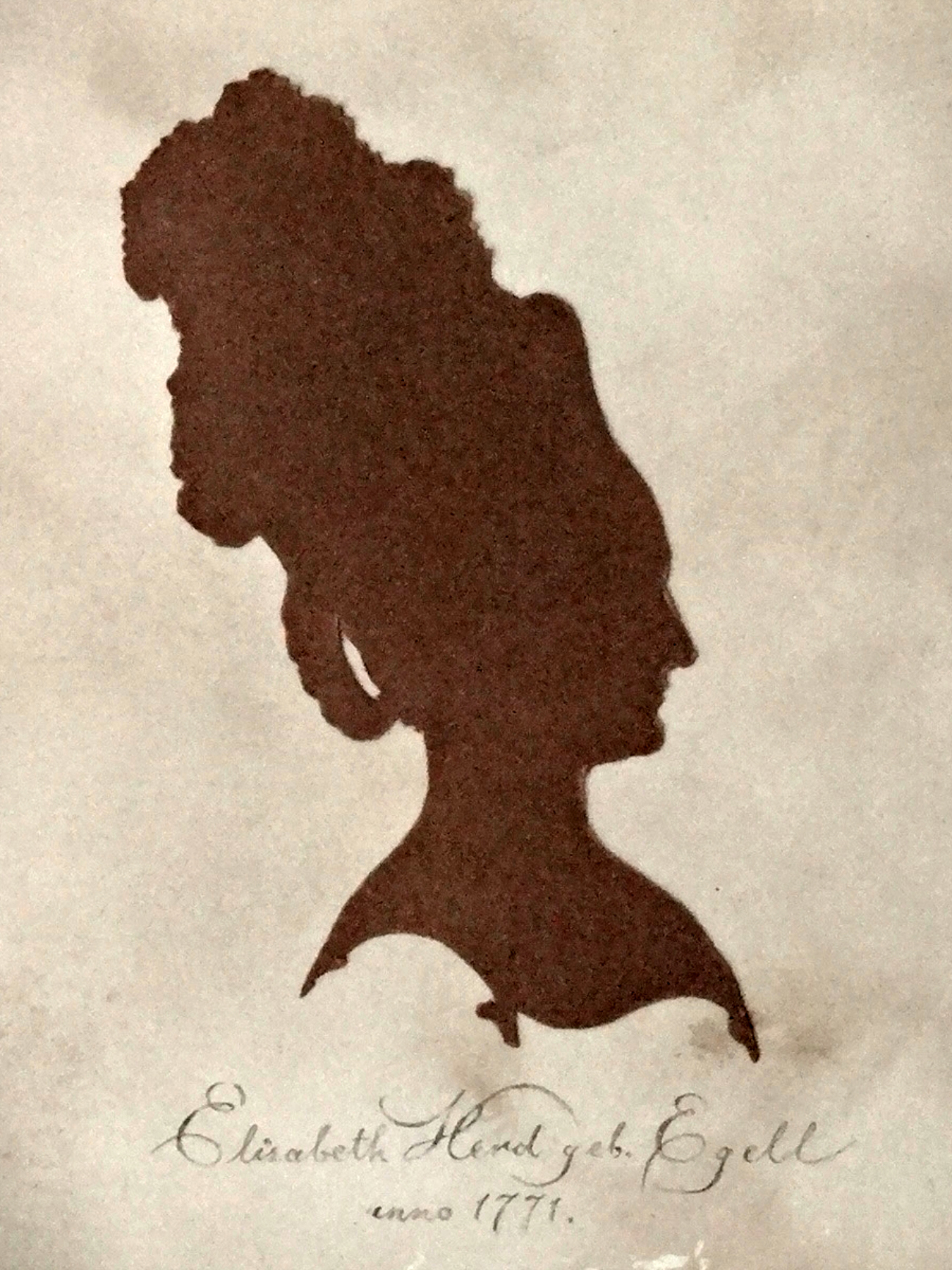
Silhouette of Elisabeth Herd, 1771

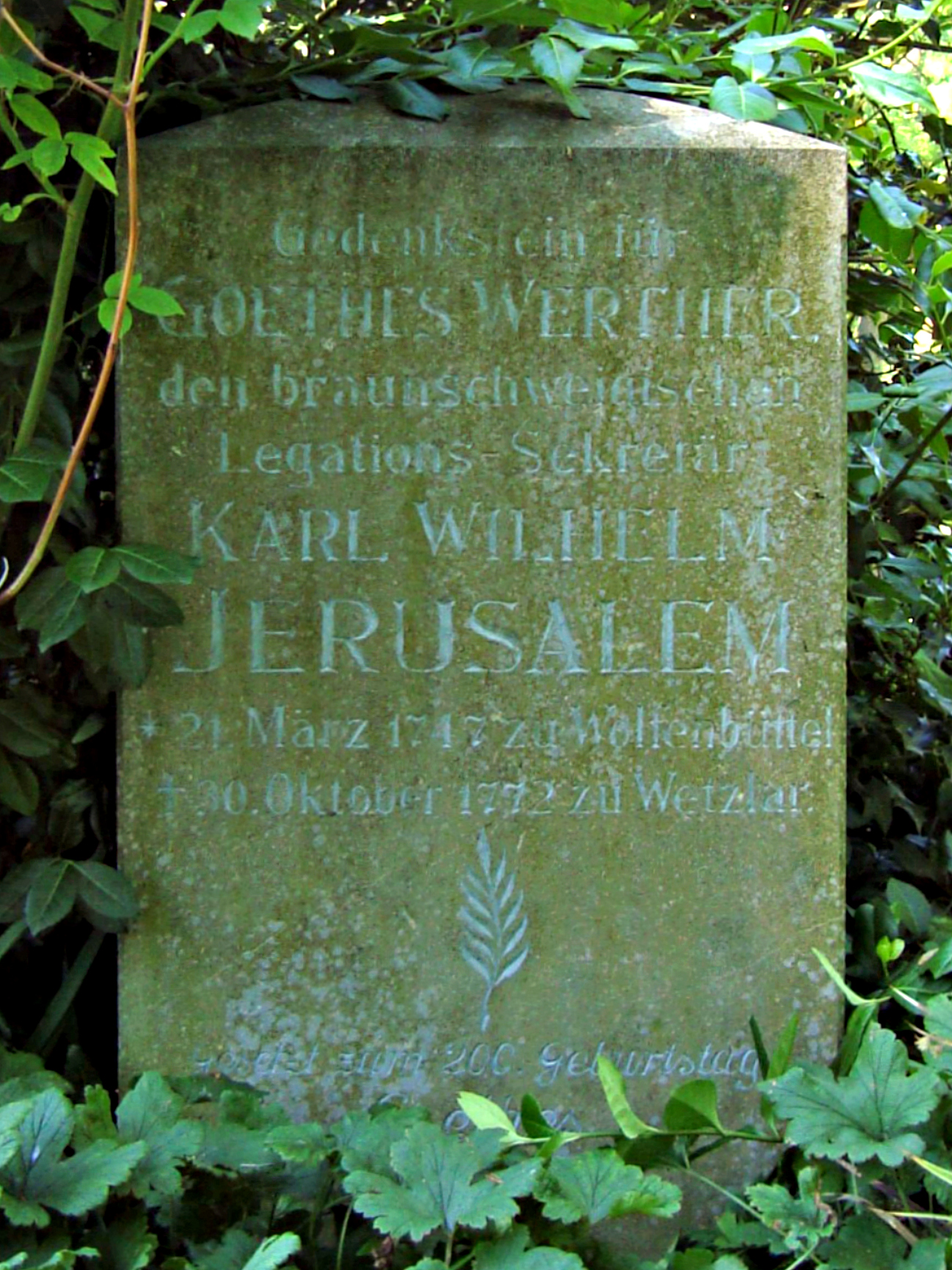
Memorial to Karl Wilhelm Jerusalem in Wetzlar

He was born in Wolfenbüttel to the Lutheran natural theologian Johann Friedrich Wilhelm Jerusalem. He attended Leipzig University, where he met but did not like Johann Wolfgang von Goethe. He then became a legation secretary to the Principality of Brunswick-Wolfenbüttel. He studied litigation at the Reichskammergericht in Wetzlar, where he again met Goethe and Johann Christian Kestner.

His middle-class background meant that he was not respected by the nobility and often clashed with his superiors. Like Goethe in Frankfurt, he found little or no job satisfaction in everyday legal work. Jerusalem also fell in love with the countess Elisabeth Herd, already engaged to a Palatinate legation secretary. With a broken heart, he shot himself in his apartment at 5 Schillerplatz in Wetzlar (now a house-museum named the Jerusalemhaus) on 29 October 1772 and died the following day. Gotthold Ephraim Lessing's tragedy Emilia Galotti was afterwards found on Jerusalem's table.

... tormented by unfulfilled passions, in no way externally stimulated to meaningful actions, in the sole prospect of having to stand our ground in a sluggish, mindless bourgeois life, we became friends with thought, with life, when it is no longer one of us, after it leaves us no more than an intention to leave it at one's own discretion

After Werther came out, Lessing wrote a sharp polemic protesting against Goethe's presentation of Jerusalem's Philosophische Aufsätze (Philosophical Essays), one of which was a defence of suicide Lessing particularly objected to his presentation of his friend Jerusalem as a "sentimental fool" whereas Lessing saw him as a "true, reflective philosopher".

== Works ==
- Gotthold Ephraim Lessing (ed.): Philosophische Aufsätze von Karl Wilhelm Jerusalem. Buchhandlung des Fürstlichen Waisenhauses, Braunschweig 1776.
- Paul Beer (ed.): Philosophische Aufsätze von Karl Wilhelm Jerusalem. (1776). Mit G. E. Lessings Vorrede und Zusätzen. Berlin 1900 (Online version)
- Heinrich Schneider (ed.); Karl Wilhelm Jerusalem: Aufsätze und Briefe. Weißbach, Heidelberg 1925.

== Bibliography ==
- Adalbert Elschenbroich (1974). "Jerusalem, Karl Wilhelm". Neue Deutsche Biographie (in German). Vol. 10. Berlin: Duncker & Humblot. pp. 416–418. (full text online).
- Jakob Minor (1881). "Jerusalem, Karl Wilhelm". Allgemeine Deutsche Biographie (in German). Vol. 13. Leipzig: Duncker & Humblot. pp. 783–785.
- Friedrich Koldewey: Werthers Urbild. In: Friedrich Koldewey: Aufsätze und Vorträge aus verschiedenen Wissensgebieten. Band 2: Lebens- und Charakterbilder. Wolfenbüttel 1881, S. 167–202.
- Roger Paulin: Der Fall Wilhelm Jerusalem. Zum Selbstmordproblem zwischen Aufklärung und Empfindsamkeit. Wallstein, Göttingen 1999, ISBN 3-89244-044-1.
- Isa Schikorsky: Jerusalem, Karl Wilhelm. In: Horst-Rüdiger Jarck, Dieter Lent u.a. (Hrsg.): Braunschweigisches Biographisches Lexikon: 8. bis 18. Jahrhundert. Appelhans Verlag, Braunschweig 2006, ISBN 3-937664-46-7, S. 376f.
- "...Kein Geistlicher hat ihn begleitet." Dokumente aus dem Nachlass von Johann Christian Kestner über den Selbstmord Carl Wilhelm Jerusalems am 30. Oktober 1772 in Wetzlar. Hrsg. Magistrat der Stadt Wetzlar. Textkommentar: Manfred Wenzel. Petersberg 2015, ISBN 978-3-7319-0218-8

== External links (in German) ==
- Literature by and about Karl Wilhelm Jerusalem in the German National Library catalogue
- Jerusalem, Karl Wilh. In: Brockhaus' Kleines Konversations-Lexikon. fünfte Auflage. Band 1. Leipzig 1911, S. 896.
