= Sorrows of Werther =

Satirical poem

"Sorrows of Werther" is a satirical poem by William Makepeace Thackeray written in response to the enormous success of Johann Wolfgang von Goethe's novel The Sorrows of Young Werther.

== Text ==
Werther had a love for Charlotte
Such as words could never utter;
Would you know how first he met her?
She was cutting bread and butter.

Charlotte was a married lady,
And a moral man was Werther,
And, for all the wealth of Indies,
Would do nothing for to hurt her.

So he sighed and pined and ogled,
And his passion boiled and bubbled,
Till he blew his silly brains out,
And no more was by it troubled.

Charlotte, having seen his body
Borne before her on a shutter,
Like a well-conducted person,
Went on cutting bread and butter.

— William Makepeace Thackeray, "Sorrows of Werther"
