= Friedrich Wilhelm Eduard Gerhard =

German archaeologist (1795–1867)

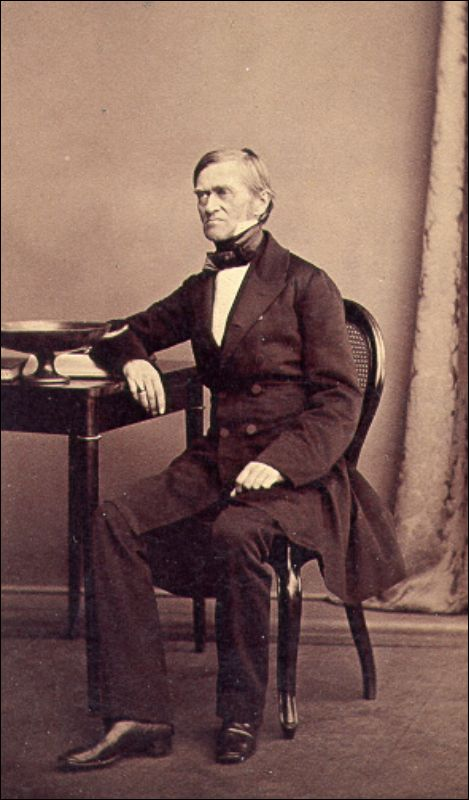
Friedrich Wilhelm Eduard Gerhard.

Friedrich Wilhelm Eduard Gerhard (29 November 1795 – 12 May 1867) was a German archaeologist. He was co-founder and secretary of the first international archaeological society.

== Biography ==
Gerhard was born at Posen, and was educated at Breslau and Berlin. The reputation he acquired by his Lectiones Apollonianae (1816) led soon afterwards to his being appointed professor at the gymnasium of Posen. On resigning that office in 1819, on account of weakness of the eyes, he went in 1822 to Rome, where he remained for fifteen years.

Gerhard was one of the principal originators of the Instituto di corrispondenza archeologica, founded at Rome in 1829, with the support of the Prussian crown prince, Frederick William. Co-founders included Theodor Panofka, Otto Magnus von Stackelberg and August Kestner. This model of international cooperation and systematic scientific publication was influenced by the example of Alexander von Humboldt, and later became the present-day German Archaeological Institute. Gerhard served as secretary to the new Institute during his stay in Rome.

Returning to Germany in 1837 he was appointed archaeologist at the Royal Museum of Berlin, and was also elected a member of the American Antiquarian Society that same year. In 1844 he was chosen a member of the Academy of Sciences, and a professor in Berlin University.

He died at Berlin.

== Evaluation ==
The New International Encyclopædia of 1905 gives the following evaluation of his work:

Gerhard's great service to archæological study was in the publication of important groups of monuments, and in promoting an orderly classification. Such a worker was much needed at this time, when the excavations at Vulci and elsewhere in Etruria increased so suddenly the mass of early vases and other small objects. For artistic beauty and style Gerhard had little perception; his interest was largely antiquarian, and it is characteristic of him that he was attracted by the Etruscan art, generally of little interest to the artist.

== Publications ==
Gerhard contributed to Platner et al.'s Beschreibung der Stadt Rom (Description of the city of Rome; Vol. I, 1829). Besides a large number of archaeological papers in periodicals, in the Annali of the Institute of Rome, and in the Transactions of the Berlin Academy, and several illustrated catalogues of Greek, Roman and other antiquities in the Berlin, Naples and Vatican Museums, Gerhard was the author of the following works:

- Rapporto intorno i vasi Volcenti (1831)
- Antike Bildwerke (Stuttgart, 1827–1844)
- Auserlesene griechische Vasenbilder (1839—1858)
- Griechische und etruskische Trinkschalen (1843)
- Etruskische und campanische Vasenbilder (1843)
- Etruskische Spiegel (4 vols., 1843–68; 5th vol. by Klugmann et al., 1897)
- Apulische Vasen (1846)
- Trinkschalen und Gefässe (1850)
- Hyperboreisch-römische Studien (vol. i., 1833; vol. ii., 1852)
- Prodromus mythologische Kunsterklärung (Stuttgart and Tübingen, 1828)
- Griechische Mythologie (1854-1855)
- Gesammelte akademische Abhandlungen und kleine Schriften, published posthumously (2 vols., Berlin, 1867)
