= Wetzlarer Festspiele =

Annual theatre festival in Hesse, Germany

The Wetzlarer Festspiele (Wetzlar Festival) is since 1953 annually a theatre festival, which taking place in the summer in the Hessian city Wetzlar. The festivals enjoy far an acknowledgment, going beyond Hesse. As the most important place for the festival, servers the open air stage Rosengärtchen within the range of the historical defensive wall, which offers place for approx. 1,000 spectators. Further places are the Castle Hermannstein (300 seats) as well as the former German medal yard in the old town of Wetzlar, the Lottehof (of 300 seats), at which the birth house of Charlotte Buff stands.
