= August Kestner =

German diplomat and art collector (1777–1853)

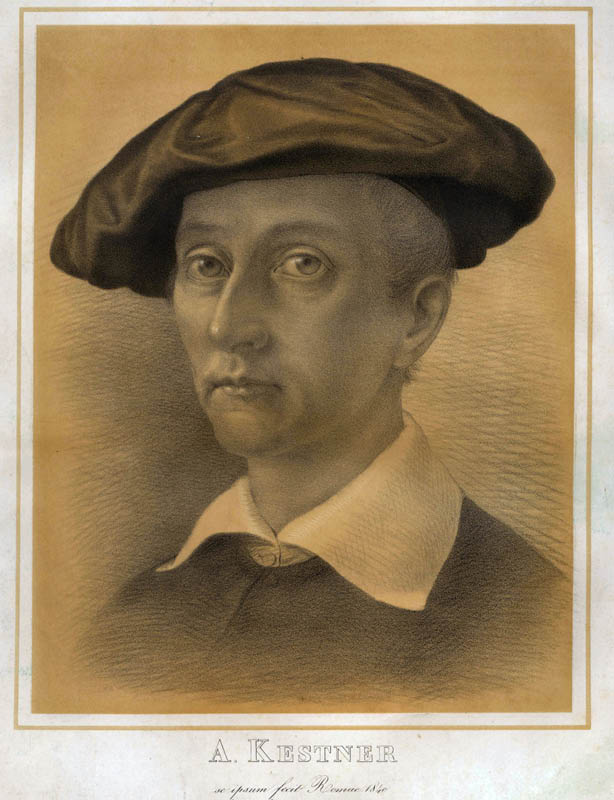
August Kestner

Georg Christian August Kestner (28 November 1777, in Hanover – 5 March 1853, in Rome) was a German diplomat and art collector.

== Life ==
Kestner was the son of civil servant Johann Christian Kestner and his wife Charlotte Buff.

From 1796 to 1799 Kestner studied law at the University of Göttingen and was immediately afterwards called up as a Vernehmungsrichter (interrogation judge) at the court in Hanover.

In 1803 Kestner was appointed 'secret office-secretary in the civil service'. As such, he made his living from 1818 to 1849, among other things, as an official envoy and Minister-resident in Rome and Naples. Also he was a diplomat of Hanover to the Holy See in Rome. As an art lover, he gathered small objects from Egyptian as well as Greco-Roman art. He, Theodor Panofka and Otto Magnus von Stackelberg founded the "Instituto di Corrispondenza Archeologica" in 1829, later to become the German Archaeological Institute, and was in 1838 entrusted with its direction as its secretary-general.

After his retirement from the civil service, Kestner lived in Rome until his death on 5 March 1853.

The Kestner-Museum in Hanover is named after him.

== Works ==
- Römische Studien (Berlin: Decker, 1850)
- Sulla: ein Trauerspiel in 5 Aufzügen (Hannover: Zahn, 1855)
- Über die Nachahmung in der Malerei (Frankfurt a.M., 1818)
- Wem gehört die Kunst (1830)

== Bibliography ==
- Marie Jorns: August Kestner und seine Zeit. 1777-1853. Das glückliche Leben des Diplomaten, Kunstsammlers und Mäzens in Hannover und Rom. Aus Briefen und Tagebüchern zusammengestellt. Hannover: Madsack 1964.
- 100 Jahre Kestner-Museum Hannover. 1889-1989. Hrsg. von Ulrich Gehrig. Hannover: Kestner-Museum 1989. ISBN 3-924029-14-8
- Auf den Spuren von August Kestner. Katalog zur gleichnamigen Ausstellung, 6. März bis 20. Juli 2003, Kestner-Museum Hannover. Hannover: Kestner-Museum 2003. (Museum Kestnerianum. 5) ISBN 3-924029-33-4
