= Theodor Panofka =

German philologist (1800–1858)

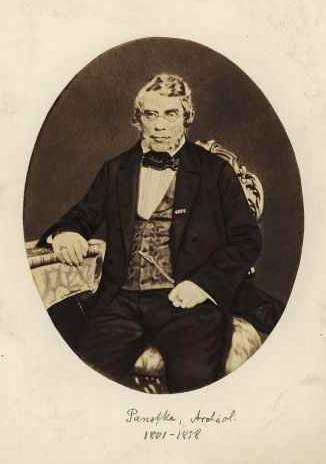
- Born: 25 February 1800; Breslau
- Died: 20 June 1858 (aged 58); Berlin
- Education: classical philology at Berlin University (1819–23)
- Occupation: Classicist

Theodor Sigismund Panofka (25 February 1800, Breslau – 20 June 1858, Berlin) was a German archaeologist, art historian, and philologist. He was one of the first scholars to make a systematic study of the pottery of Ancient Greece, and one of the founders of the institution later to become the German Archaeological Institute (Deutsches archäologisches Institut).

== Life ==
Panofka studied classical philology at Berlin University from 1819. In 1823 he travelled to Rome and a year later – along with the painter Otto Magnus von Stackelberg (1787–1837), the art writer and collector August Kestner and the classical art historian Eduard Gerhard – founded the "Hyperboreans" (Hyperboreisch-römische Gesellschaft), a group of northern European scholars who studied classical ruins in Rome. In Rome, Panofka's intelligence drew attention and patronage from the Duc de Blacas (1770–1839), the French ambassador to the Papal States, and a collector of antiquities, with whom Panofka remained upon the duke's 1828 return to Paris. When in 1829 the "Hyperboreans" metamorphosed into the Instituto di Corrispondenza Archaeologica, Panofka was named the new organisation's secretary for its members in Paris.

Panofka travelled to southern Italy, where he became involved in the antiquities collection of the Museo Nazionale in Naples, in particular cataloguing its vases of the museum. (At the same time, Gerhard was cataloguing the classical sculpture.) On his subsequent return to Paris, Panofka published these researches on Greek pottery as Recherches sur les véritables noms des vases grecs (Researches on the true names of Greek vases).

However, by 1836, he had moved to work at the Royal Museum in Berlin, where his knowledge of classical vases eventually led to his being appointed curator of the vase collection. Despite his growing deafness, and his becoming less and less able to support himself on the museum's wages, Panofka managed to publish Terracotten des königlichen Museums zu Berlin (Terracottas of the Royal Museum in Berlin) in 1842, and a philological study of the figure of the African in the cult of Delphi in 1849. The latter was ahead of its time, in that nobody had yet realised the relation of Delphi with Egypt. He had become Professor of Archaeology at Berlin University in 1844, and in 1856, two years before his death, became Conservator of the Museum's vases collection (Vasensammlung). He died in Berlin at 58.

== Posts ==
- 1826–34 Personal tutor of the Duke of Blacas (whilst in Paris), and foreign secretary of the French section of the Archeological Institute in Rome (whilst in Naples).
- 1836 Assistant at the Royal Museum in Berlin
- 1844 Professor of archaeology at Berlin University
- 1856 Conservator of the Royal Museum's vases collection (Vasensammlung) in Berlin

== Reception ==
Later scholars have demonstrated that Panofka was overly subjective on his judgment of vases and made numerous errors. However, in spite of this criticism, his support for intellectual societies, in particular the early Instituto di Corrispondenza Archaeologica in Rome, was important preliminaries the inception of the present German Archaeological Institute (Deutsches archäologisches Institut) in 1871, which lasts to this day as the intellectual organization for German classical research.

== Sources ==
- Archäologenbildnisse: Porträts und Kurzbiographien von Klassichen Archäologen deutscher Sprache. Reinhard Lullies, ed. Mainz am Rhein: Verlag Philipp von Zabern, 1988: 25-26.
- Suzanne L. Marchand. Down from Olympus: Archaeology and Philhellenism in Germany, 1750–1970. Princeton, NJ: Princeton University Press, 1996: 54-56
- "Panofka, Theordor." Encyclopedia of the History of Classical Archaeology. Nancy Thomson de Grummond, ed. Westport, CT: Greenwood Press, 1996, vol. 2, pp. 846.
- Gloria Ferrari, "Myth and Genre on Athenian Vases", Classical Antiquity, April 2003, Vol. 22, No. 1, Pages 37–54

== Works ==
- Recherches sur les véritables noms des vases grecs et sur leurs différens usages, d'après les auteurs et les monumens anciens. Paris: Leipsick, Debure frères [and] M. Weigel, 1829.
- Antiques du Cabinet du Comte de Pourtals-Gorgier. Paris, 1834
- Terracotten des königlichen Museums zu Berlin. Berlin : G. Reimer, 1842
- Bilder Antiken Lebens, 1843
- Asklepios u. die Asklepiades, Abhemdl. Der Berliner Acad., 1845 (in which. p. 350 et u. 5, he asserts that the artist of this carving is depicting three of Asklepios’ four daughters in the form of the three Charites or Graces Pharmadetailings.com).
- Die griechischen Eigennamen mit Kalos im Zusammenhang mit dem Bilderschmuck auf bemalten Gefässen. Berlin: Gedruckt in der Druckerei der König. Akademie der Wissenschaften, 1850
- His letters are included in Raumer, Friedrich von, editor. Antiquarische Briefe. Leipzig: F. A. Brockhaus, 1851
