= The Sorrows of Young Werther =

1774 novel by J.W. Goethe

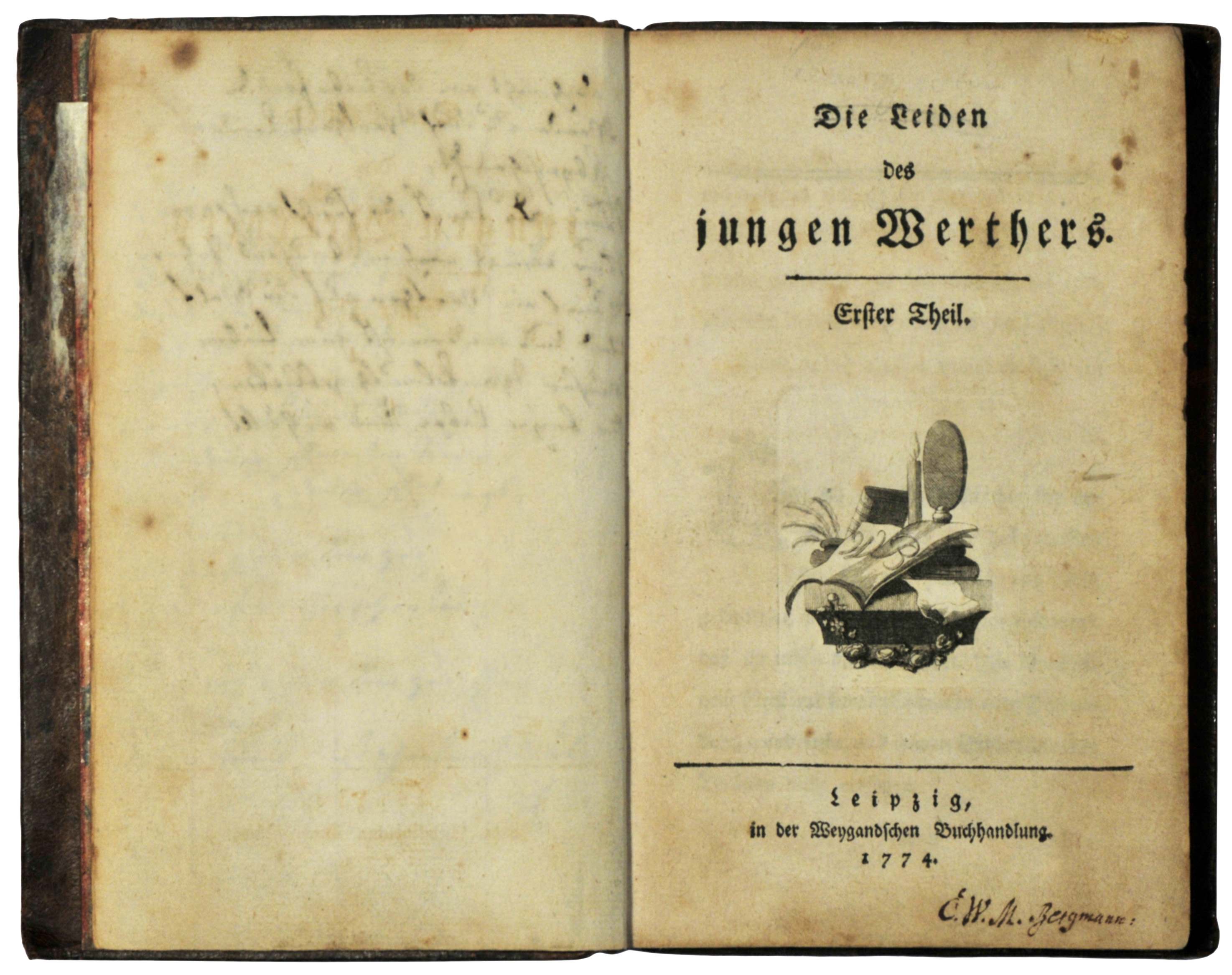
- First print 1774
- Author: Johann Wolfgang Goethe
- Original title: Die Leiden des jungen Werthers
- Language: German
- Genre: Epistolary novel
- Publisher: Weygand'sche Buchhandlung, Leipzig
- Publication date: 29 September 1774, revised ed. 1787
- Publication place: Electorate of Saxony
- English publication date: 1779
- Dewey Decimal: 833.6
- LC Class: PT2027.W3
- Text: The Sorrows of Young Werther at Wikisource

The Sorrows of Young Werther ([ˈveːɐ̯tɐ]; German: Die Leiden des jungen Werthers), or simply Werther, is a 1774 epistolary novel by Johann Wolfgang Goethe, which appeared as a revised edition in 1787. It was one of the main novels of the Sturm und Drang period in German literature, and influenced the later Romantic movement. Goethe, aged 24 at the time, finished Werther in five and a half weeks of intensive writing in January to March 1774. It instantly placed him among the foremost international literary celebrities and was among the best known of his works.

The novel was adapted as the opera Werther by Jules Massenet in 1892.

== Plot summary ==
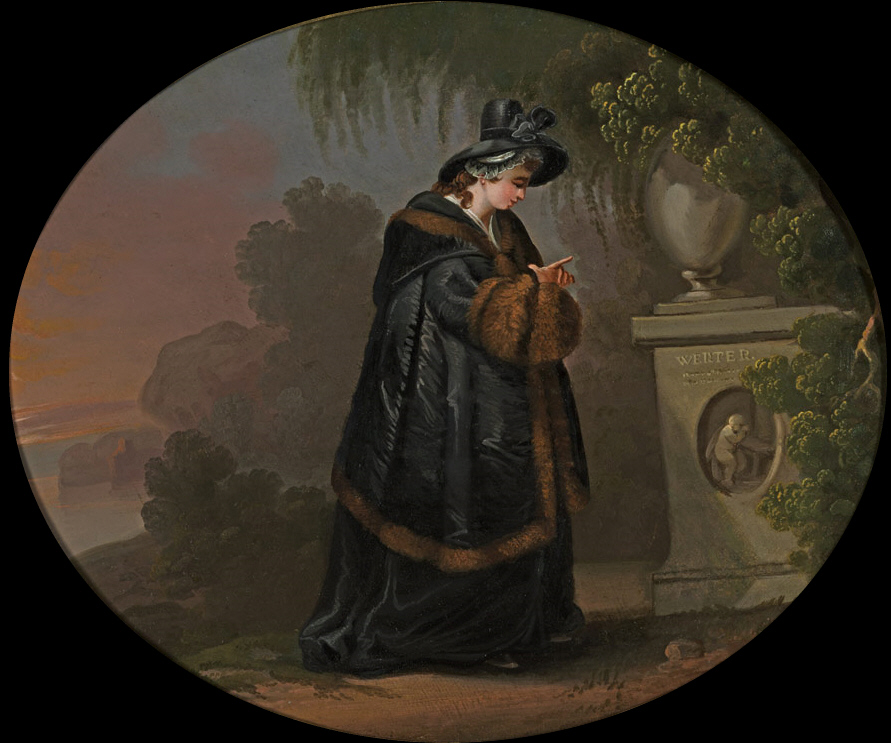
Charlotte at Werther's grave. This scene is not in the novel.

The Sorrows of Young Werther, a story about a young man's unrequited love, is presented as a collection of letters written by Werther, a young artist of a sensitive and passionate temperament. Most of the letters are written to his friend Wilhelm, but additional details are at times provided by an unidentified editor. The letters give an intimate account of his emotional life during his stay in the fictional village of Wahlheim (based on Garbenheim, near Wetzlar). There he meets Charlotte, a beautiful young girl who takes care of her siblings after the death of their mother. Werther falls in love with Charlotte despite knowing before meeting her that she is engaged to a man named Albert, eleven years her senior. Albert returns to Wahlheim shortly thereafter.

Despite the pain it causes him, Werther spends the next few months cultivating a close friendship with them both. His sorrow eventually becomes so unbearable that he is forced to leave Wahlheim for Weimar, where he makes the acquaintance of Fräulein von B. He suffers great embarrassment when he forgetfully visits a friend, the Count of O——, and unexpectedly has to face there the weekly gathering of the entire aristocratic set. He is not tolerated and asked to leave since he is not a nobleman.

He then returns to Wahlheim, where he suffers still more than before, partly because Charlotte and Albert are now married. The unrequited love brings Werther to a state of dejection. Albert becomes increasingly discontent with the persistence of the love triangle and behaves coldly towards Werther, though he remains characteristically secure. Charlotte decides that it is not tenable for her to remain so close to Werther. With difficulty, she tells Werther that he must not visit her so frequently, and encourages him to have greater self-control and move on from his fixation with her. At their penultimate meeting, she suggests that "it is only the impossibility of possessing me that makes this desire so exciting to you", and adds that this observation could have been made by "anyone". He visits her one final time, and they are both overcome with emotion after he recites to her a passage of his own translation of Ossian that prefigures his death.

Werther has a tendency towards suicidal ideation, and he makes pessimistic remarks about life in letters prior to having met Charlotte. Werther himself recognises the situation as being untenable, and contemplates a double murder-suicide, but instead resolves to take only his own life. After composing a farewell letter to be found after his death, he writes to Albert asking for his two pistols, on the pretext that he is going "on a journey". Charlotte receives the request with great emotion, anticipating Werther's suicide, and hesitantly hands the pistols to Werther's servant, at Albert's command. Werther shoots himself in the head at his desk at midnight, is found at 6 the next morning, and is declared dead at noon. He is buried eleven hours later. Charlotte falls unconscious upon learning of his death and the others fear for her life.

== Relation to Goethe's life ==
The novel was inspired by Goethe's personal life and involved triangular relationships of real people. One triangular relationship involved Goethe, Charlotte Buff, and Christian Kestner. The other involved Goethe, Maximiliane von La Roche, and Peter Anton Brentano (who married Maximiliane in January, 1774). Goethe spent the summer of 1772 in Wetzlar, where he quickly fell in love with Charlotte, who was already engaged to Christian Kestner. Goethe pulled away from her after a few months. Almost immediately, he fell in love with Maximiliane, who was only 16 years old and above him in social station, thus setting the scene for another unrequited love affair. Meanwhile an acquaintance of Goethe and his friends in Wetzlar, Karl Wilhelm Jerusalem, was suffering from a similar impossible love, in his case with a countess who was engaged already. Jerusalem, 25 years old, was a lawyer and minor philosopher. On the night of 29 or 30 October 1772, he used a pistol borrowed from Kestner to shoot himself in the head. These events are fictionalized to describe the emotional tumult of the titular character Werther, who kills himself in despair after he falls in love with a woman engaged to another man.

== Effect on Goethe ==
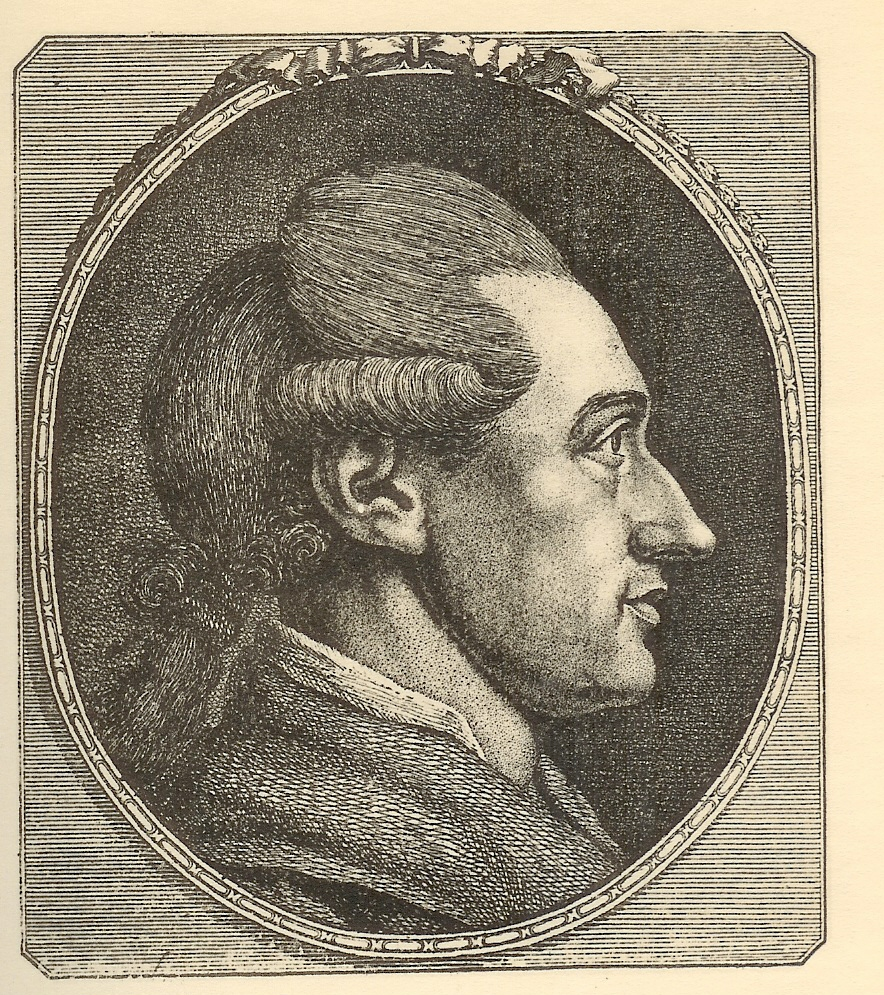
Goethe portrait in profile

Werther was one of Goethe's few works akin in style and mood to the German proto-Romantic movement known as Sturm und Drang, a movement he renounced after he and Friedrich von Schiller moved into Weimar Classicism. The novel was published anonymously, and Goethe distanced himself from it in his later years, regretting the fame it had brought him and the consequent attention to his own youthful love of Charlotte Buff, then already engaged to Johann Christian Kestner. Although he wrote Werther at the age of 24, it remained the only work of his with which many of his visitors were familiar, even in his old age. Goethe had changed his views of literature radically by then, even denouncing the Romantic movement as "everything that is sick."

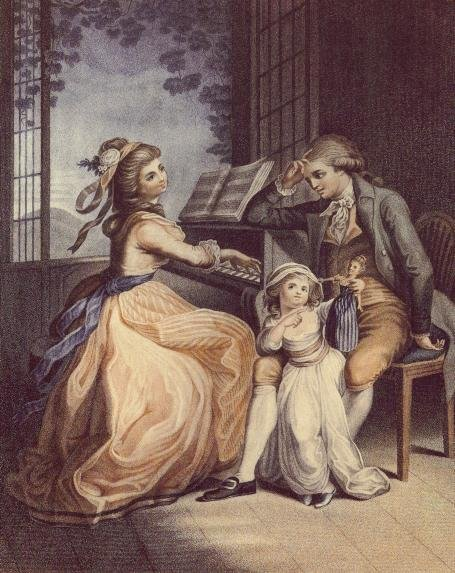
Colored engraving of Werther and Lotte

Regarding the effect of the book, Goethe wrote that even if Werther had been a brother of his whom he had killed, he could not have been more haunted by his vengeful ghost. Yet, Goethe substantially reworked the book for the 1787 edition and acknowledged the great personal and emotional influence that The Sorrows of Young Werther could exert on forlorn young lovers who discovered it. His secretary Johann Peter Eckermann later attributed these comments to Goethe:

[Werther], said Goethe, "is a creation which I, like the pelican, fed with the blood of my own heart. It contains so much from the innermost recesses of my breast—so much feeling and thought, that it might easily be spread into a novel of ten such volumes. **** On considering more closely the much-talked-of 'Werther' period, we discover that it does not belong to the course of universal culture, but to the career of life in every individual, who, with an innate free natural instinct, must accommodate himself to the narrow limits of an antiquated world. Obstructed fortune, restrained activity, unfulfilled wishes, are not the calamities of any particular time, but those of every individual man; and it would be bad, indeed, if every one had not, once in his life, known a time when 'Werther' seemed as if it had been written for him alone."

== Cultural impact ==
The Sorrows of Young Werther became an immediate international bestseller, perhaps the first in the history of literature. The book spawned the phenomenon known as "Werther Fever," inspiring young men throughout Europe to dress in the clothing style described for Werther in the novel. Items of merchandising such as prints, decorated Meissen porcelain and even a perfume were produced. Napoleon Bonaparte considered Werther one of the great works of European literature, having written a Goethe-inspired soliloquy in his youth, and carried Werther with him on his campaign in Egypt. Thomas Carlyle coined an epithet, "Wertherism", to describe the self-indulgency of the age that the phenomenon represented.

The book reputedly also led to some of the first known examples of copycat suicide, also known as the "Werther effect", whose victims dressed as Werther did and even used pistols similar to Werther's. Often the book was found at the scene of the suicide. Rüdiger Safranski, however, a modern biographer of Goethe, dismisses the Werther effect "as only a persistent rumor." Nonetheless, this aspect of "Werther Fever" was watched with concern by the authorities – both the novel and the Werther clothing style were banned in Leipzig in 1775; the novel was also banned in Denmark and Italy.

Goethe likened his own mood, after completing Werther, to one experienced "after a general confession, joyous and free and entitled to a new life." For Goethe the Werther effect was a cathartic one, freeing him from the despair in his life. But, the work having been published anonymously, his authorship was not immediately known. Some at first assumed its author to be Christoph Martin Wieland.

The work was watched with fascination by fellow authors. One of these, Friedrich Nicolai, decided to create a satirical piece with a happy ending, entitled Die Freuden des jungen Werthers ("The Joys of Young Werther"), in which Albert, realizing what Werther is up to, loads chicken's blood into the pistol, thereby foiling Werther's suicide, and happily concedes Charlotte to him. After some initial difficulties, Werther sheds his passionate youthful side and reintegrates himself into society as a respectable citizen. Goethe, however, was not pleased with the "Freuden" and started a literary war with Nicolai that lasted all his life, writing a poem titled "Nicolai auf Werthers Grabe" ("Nicolai on Werther's grave"), in which Nicolai (here a passing nameless pedestrian) defecates on Werther's grave, so desecrating the memory of a Werther from which Goethe had distanced himself in the meantime, as he had from the Sturm und Drang. This argument was continued in Goethe's collection of short and critical poems the Xenien and his play Faust.

Goethe's work also had a tremendous impact on the 18th-century Hungarian writer and lawyer, Kármán József, who had quite a short literary career, spanning only five years. Kármán's most popular work, Fanni hagyományai, was inspired by Goethe's use of epistolary novel and the sentimentalist style. This seminal work in Hungarian literature took him only two years to write. At the time, this movement (sentimentalism) was not as widespread throughout Europe, making his literary work innovative, unique and also the precursor to Romanticism in Hungary.

== Alternative versions and appearances ==
- The 21st sonnet featured in Charlotte Smith's Elegiac Sonnets and Other Poems is written from Werther's perspective, and tells of the unrequited love he feels for Charlotte.
- Amelia Pickering's 1788 poem, "The Sorrows of Young Werther", retells Werther's story from Charlotte's perspective.
- In 1800, Goethe's novel was adapted into the short story "Werther and Charlotte" which featured in an anonymously published collection of stories.
- Goethe's work was the basis for the 1892 opera Werther by Jules Massenet.
- In Mary Shelley's Frankenstein, Frankenstein's monster finds the book in a leather portmanteau, along with two others – Plutarch's Lives of the Noble Greeks and Romans, and Milton's Paradise Lost. He sees Werther's case as similar to his own, of one rejected by those he loved.
- The book influenced Ugo Foscolo's The Last Letters of Jacopo Ortis, which tells of a young man who commits suicide, out of desperation caused not only by love, but by the political situation of Italy before Italian unification. This is taken to be the first Italian epistolary novel.
- Thomas Carlyle, who incidentally translated Goethe's novel Wilhelm Meister's Apprenticeship into English, frequently refers to and parodies Werther's relationship in his 1836 novel Sartor Resartus.
- The statistician Karl Pearson's first book was The New Werther.
- William Makepeace Thackeray wrote a poem satirizing Goethe's story entitled "Sorrows of Werther".
- Henri Pouctal made a film adaptation in 1910, considered to be lost.
- Max Ophüls's 1938 film The Novel of Werther is an adaptation of the novel.
- Thomas Mann's 1939 novel Lotte in Weimar recounts a fictional reunion between Goethe and his youthful passion, Charlotte Buff, as elderlies.
- In 1968 Jean-Pierre Lajournade made a metacinematic critical reading of the novel in Werther (aka Les Souffrances du jeune Werther), a film made for TV infused with the aesthetics and the politics of the time.
- Spanish filmmaker Pilar Miró adapted the novel in 1986 in Werther.
- Ulrich Plenzdorf, a GDR poet, wrote a satirical novel (and play) called Die neuen Leiden des jungen W. ("The New Sorrows of Young W."), transposing the events into an East German setting, with the protagonist as an ineffectual teenager rebelling against the system.
- In William Hill Brown's The Power of Sympathy, the novel appears next to Harrington's unsealed suicide note.
- The 2010 German film Goethe! is a fictional account of the relations between the young Goethe, Charlotte Buff and her fiancé Kestner, which at times draws on that of Werther, Charlotte and Albert.
- The 2014 novel The Sorrows of Young Mike by John Zelazny is a loosely autobiographical parody of Goethe's novel.
- The story is read to the dragon Temeraire by Captain William Laurence in Naomi Novik’s novel Black Powder War, the third book in the Temeraire series.
- In 2024, Young Werther, a film based on Goethe's work, was released, debuting at that year's Toronto International Film Festival, starring Alison Pill, Patrick Adams, Iris Apatow and Douglas Booth (in the title role).

== English translations ==
- The Sorrows of Werter, trans. Daniel Malthus (from the French of M. Aubry) (1779)
- The Sorrows of Werter, trans. John Gifford (from the French of M. Aubry) (1789)
- The Letters of Werter, trans. unknown (1799)
- The Sorrows of Werter, trans. William Render (1801)
- The Sorrows of Werter, trans. Frederick Gotzberg (1802)
- The Sorrows of Werter, trans. Dr. Pratt (1809)
- The Sorrows of Werter, trans. R. Dillon Boylan (1854)
- The Sufferings of Young Werther, tr. Harry Steinhauer, New York: WW Norton & Co, 1970, ISBN 0-393-09880-X
- The Sorrows of Young Werther, & Novelle, Classics Edition, tr. Elizabeth Mayer, Louise Bogan; poems transl. & foreword W. H. Auden, Vintage Books, June 1990 [1971], ISBN 0-679-72951-8; originally publ. by Random House.
- The Sorrows of Young Werther, Classics Library Complete Collection, tr. Michael Hulse, Penguin Books, 1989, ISBN 0-14-044503-X.
- The Sorrows of Young Werther, Modern Library, tr. Burton Pike, Random House, 2004, ISBN 0-8129-6990-1.
- The Sufferings of Young Werther, trans. Stanley Corngold (2011)
- The Sorrows of Young Werther, Oxford World's Classics, tr. David Constantine, Oxford University Press, 2012, ISBN 978-0199583027.

== See also ==
- Werther effect
- William Render
