= Wetzlar =

City in Hesse, Germany

- Town
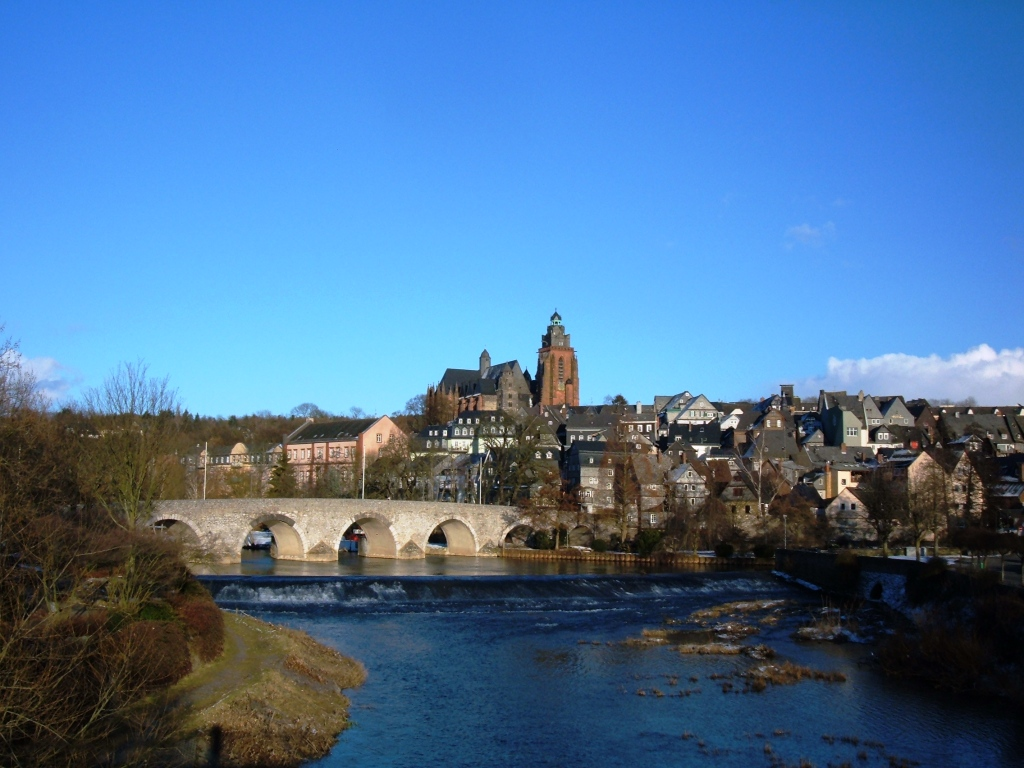
- The old town and the old Lahnbridge

- Flag Coat of arms

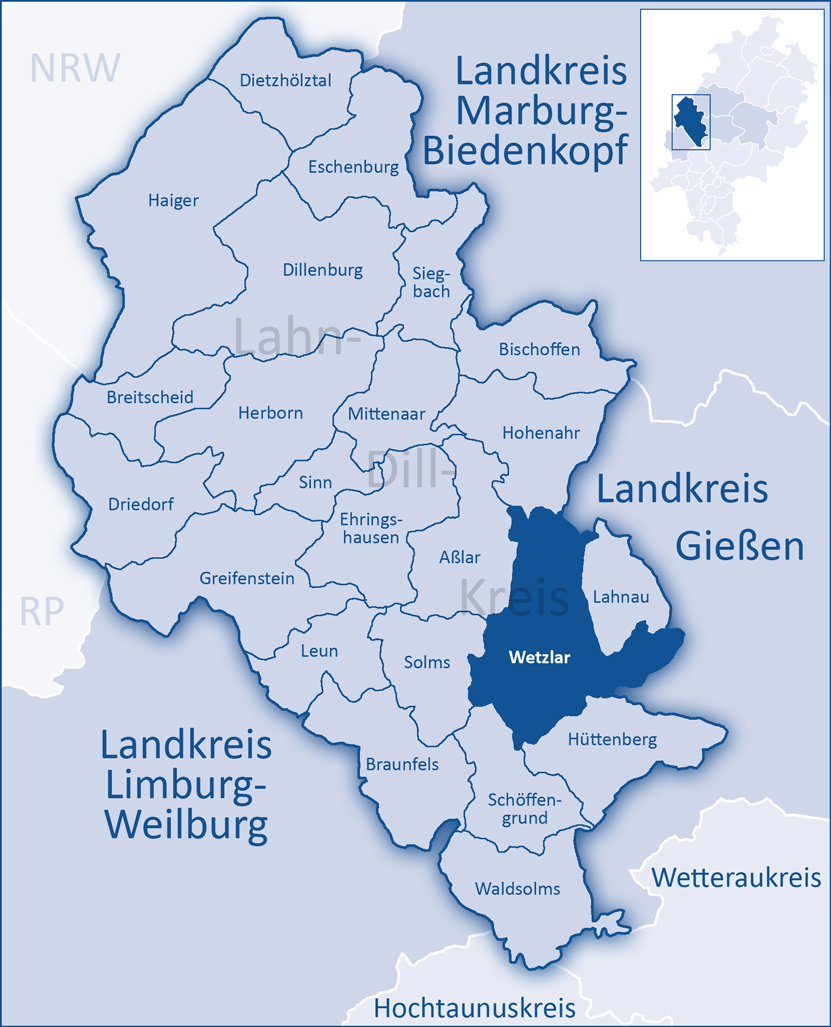
- Location of Wetzlar within Lahn-Dill-Kreis district
- Interactive map of Wetzlar
- Location within Germany Location within Hesse
- Coordinates: 50°34′N 8°30′E
- Country: Germany
- State: Hesse
- District: Lahn-Dill-Kreis
- Subdivisions: 8 quarters

Government
  - Mayor (2021–27): Manfred Wagner (SPD)

Area
  - Total: 75.65 km^{2} (29.21 sq mi)
- Elevation: 148–402 m (486–1,319 ft)

Population (2025-12-31)
  - Total: 54,865
  - Density: 725.2/km^{2} (1,878/sq mi)
- Time zone: UTC+01:00 (CET)
  - Summer (DST): UTC+02:00 (CEST)
- Postal codes: 35576–35586
- Dialling codes: 06441, 0641, 06446
- Vehicle registration: LDK, WZ
- Website: www.wetzlar.de

Wetzlar (German pronunciation: [ˈvɛtslaːɐ̯]) is a city in the state of Hesse, Germany. It is the twelfth largest city in Hesse with currently 55,371 inhabitants at the beginning of 2019 (including second homes). As an important cultural, industrial and commercial centre, the university town is one of the ten regional centres in the state of Hesse. A former free imperial city, it gained much of its fame as the seat of the Imperial Supreme Court (Reichskammergericht) of the Holy Roman Empire. Located 51 kilometres north of Frankfurt, at 8° 30′ E, 50° 34′ N, Wetzlar straddles the river Lahn and is on the German Timber-Frame Road, which passes mile upon mile of half-timbered houses. Historically, the city has acted as the hub of the Lahn-Dill-Kreis on the north edge of the Taunus. Tourists know the city for its ancient town and its medieval Catholic/Protestant shared cathedral of St. Mary. Notable architectural features include the Eisenmarkt and the steep gradients and tightly packed street layout of a medieval town. The building of the sandstone cathedral commenced in the 12th century in Romanesque style. In the later Middle Ages the construction continued under a master plan in Gothic style. The church was never finished—one steeple still remains uncompleted. The cathedral suffered heavy damage in the Second World War from aerial bombing, but restoration took place in the 1950s. On the outskirts of town along the river stand the ruins of several stone towers.

The town hosted the Hessentag state festival twice (the 15th and the 52nd in 1975 and 2012 respectively).

== Geography ==
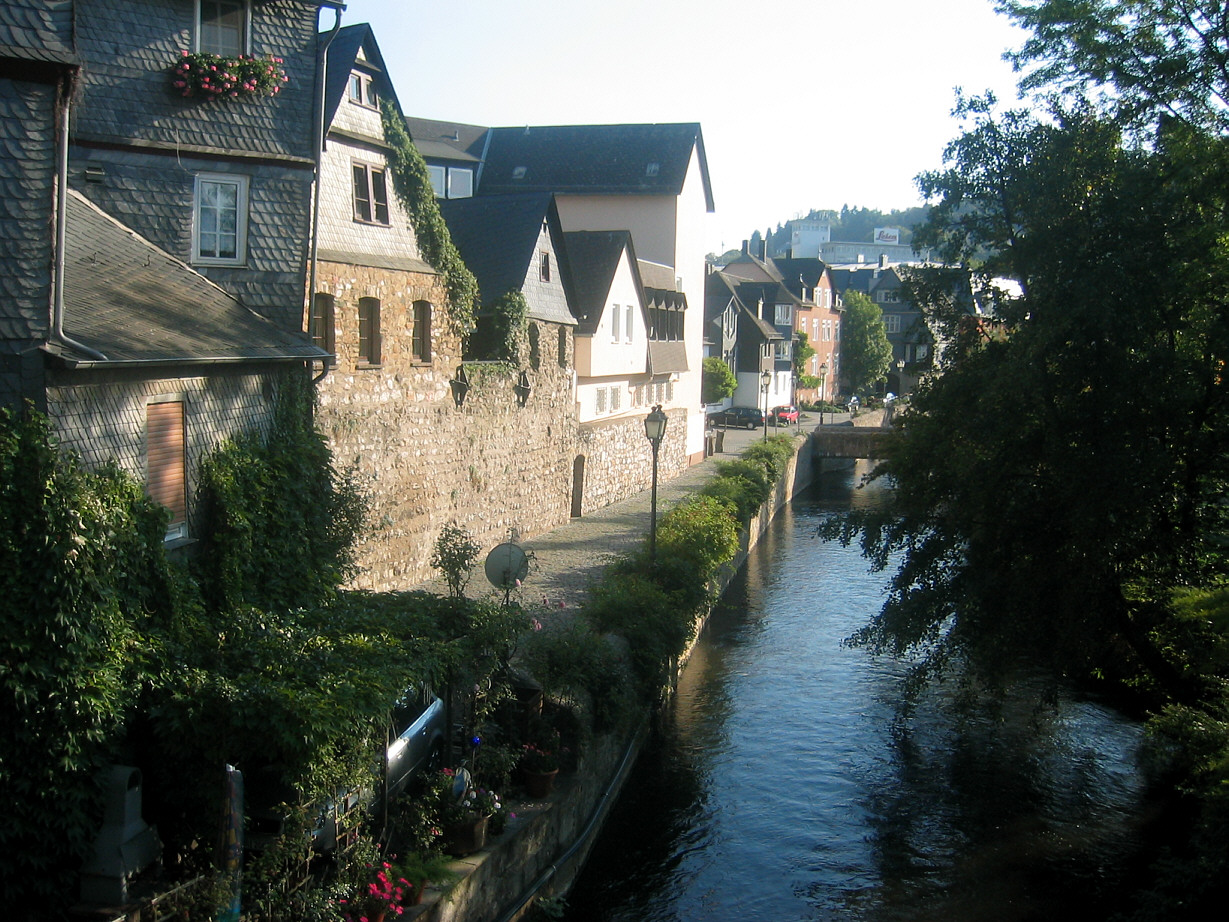
On the Lahn

Wetzlar lies in the Lahn-Dill area in Middle Hesse on the river Lahn, not far downstream from where it changes direction from south to west in the heights near the mouth of the Dill. The town lies at a point that divides the low Hessian mountain ranges: south of the Lahn lies the Taunus; north of the Lahn and west of the Dill the Westerwald begins; north of the Lahn and east of the Dill the Rothaargebirge begin. The highest point within town limits is the Stoppelberg at 401 m above sea level.

Wetzlar's neighbouring towns and cities are Gießen (up the Lahn from centre to centre about 12 km), Koblenz 80 km (50 mi) down the Lahn, Limburg an der Lahn 40 km (25 mi) to the west, Siegen 50 km (31 mi) to the northwest, Dillenburg 30 km (19 mi) to the north, Marburg 30 km (19 mi) to the northeast and Frankfurt am Main 60 km (37 mi) to the south.

Wetzlar and Gießen are the two cores of this small (about 200,000 inhabitants) urban agglomeration in Middle Hesse. Along the valleys of the Lahn (east and west) and Dill (north) are heavily built-up neighbouring communities, whose built-up areas in some places merge with Wetzlar's. The low mountain ranges around Wetzlar to the northwest, northeast and south, on the other hand, are heavily wooded and very thinly populated.

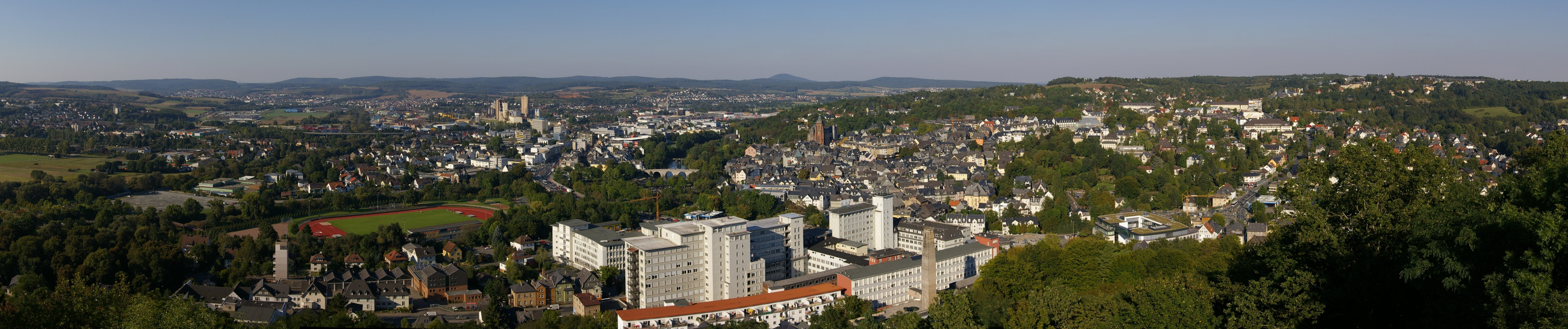
Wetzlar

=== Neighbouring communities ===
Wetzlar borders in the northwest on the town of Aßlar (Lahn-Dill-Kreis), to the north and northeast on the communities of Hohenahr (Lahn-Dill-Kreis) and Biebertal (Gießen district), to the east on the communities of Lahnau (Lahn-Dill-Kreis) and Heuchelheim and the town of Gießen (both in Gießen district), to the south on the communities of Hüttenberg and Schöffengrund and to the west on the town of Solms (all in the Lahn-Dill-Kreis).

=== Constituent communities ===
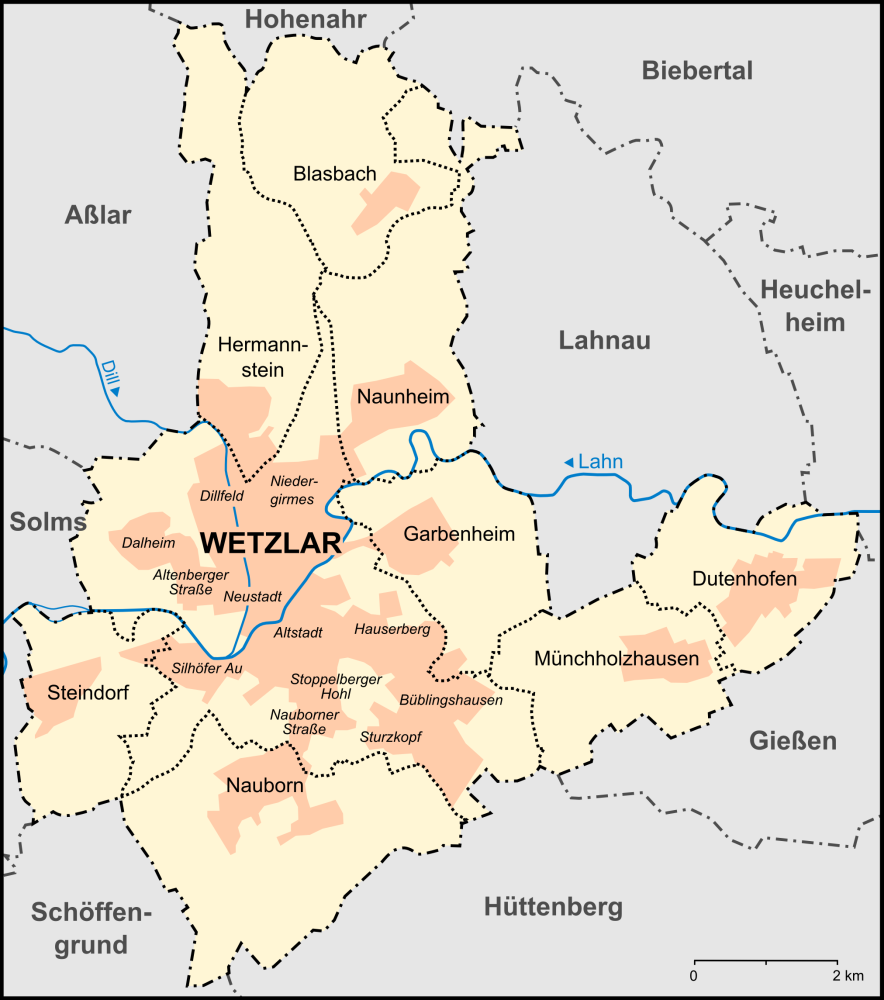
The districts and neighbouring communities of Wetzlar

The core area of Wetzlar with 30,684 inhabitants is divided into twelve boroughs (Stadtbezirke): Altstadt, Neustadt, Hauser Berg, Büblingshausen, Sturzkopf, Stoppelberger Hohl, Nauborner Straße, Silhöfer Aue/Westend, Altenberger Strasse, Dalheim, Dillfeld and Niedergirmes. Niedergirmes is with over 6,000 inhabitants the largest municipality.

Furthermore, there are 8 districts (Stadtteile) outside the core area. Five of them have long since been swallowed up in Wetzlar's main built-up area. All, however, became part of Wetzlar with the dissolution of the city of Lahn in 1979, excluding Blasbach, Dutenhofen and Münchholzhausen which have long belonged to the city. These are east of the core towns of Naunheim (3882), Garbenheim (2080), Münchholzhausen (2420) and Dutenhofen (3152). Nauborn (3721) is located south of the core area and Steindorf (1704) follows on from the west central area. North of the core area are Blasbach (994) and Hermannstein (3588) (population in brackets, as of 31 December 2007).

=== Climate ===
Wetzlar has a year-round temperate seasonal climate of the middle latitudes. Between the different elevations there are different small climatic conditions. The daily mean temperature in summer is about 17 to 18 °C (63 to 64 °F) and in winter about 1 to 2 °C (34 to 36 °F). The average rainfall is 600 to 700 mm (24 to 28 in), slightly below the German national average. On the high ground to the south and north of the Lahn valley there is a rainfall of 800 mm (31 in) which is exactly the national average. The wettest months are June and December, with 74 mm (2.9 in) and 73.3 mm (2.9 in), the driest month is February with 49.1 mm (1.9 in).

=== Geology ===
Wetzlar lies on the eastern edge of the Rhenish Massif. The substrate consists of geologically young sediments of the Lahn and much older Devonian and Carboniferous rocks of the two main geological units of the massif, the Lahnmulde and the so-called Giessen nappe. The northwestern part of the urban area lies on the Lahntal silt, sand and gravel, which have only slightly hardened. They were deposited by the River Lahn, at a point where its valley (which is still up to one kilometre wide) to the west becomes increasingly narrow and deep. The main part of the city is built on in part intensively folded, faulted and slated layers of shales, sandstone, quartzite and limestone. They were deposited in the Devonian and Carboniferous periods in a sea characterised by island chains, volcanoes and atolls that were pushed together and covered by a layer of rock that had been transported from another location during the period of mountain building known as the Variscan orogeny. The marine sedimentary rocks which resulted from this tectonic action now give the town its character as they were often used for building material.

== Demography ==
Wetzlar had on 31 December 2005 a municipal census for the city of 52,741 inhabitants (of which 21,946 are male and 24,313 female), 31,022 of which came from the core city (Kernstadt) and 21,719 in the 8 districts. Thus Wetzlar it the eleventh largest city in Hesse. The proportion of foreigners is 11.6% (6371 inhabitants), these are spread over 103 nations. The unemployment rate in the district of the employment agency without the offices of Dillenburg and Wetzlar Biedenkopf (which includes the city of Wetzlar, and 12 surrounding municipalities) was in July 2009 6.9%, which corresponds to 5698 unemployed.

== History ==
The town's founding date is not known. There were "Bandkeramiker" settlements right on the western town limits, partly from 5,000 years BC.

Iron ore extraction and smelting in and around Wetzlar has been documented as early as the Celtic La Tène period. Iron processing has a tradition of around 2500 years there. There were also pit fields for copper, silver and gold in and around Wetzlar, albeit much later.

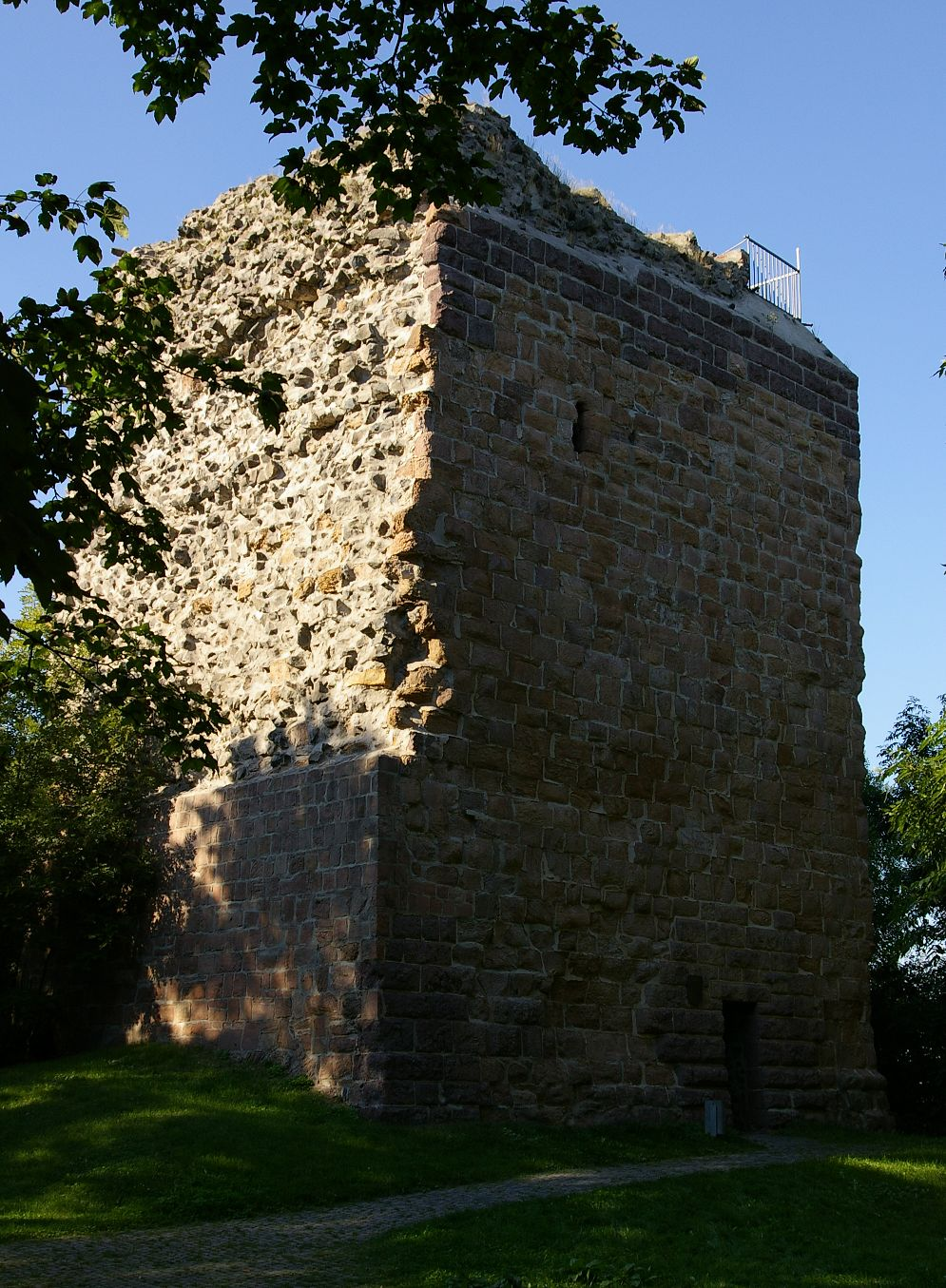
Kalsmunt castle ruins.

In the proximity of Wetzlar there are also a few Roman remains, which were constructed during the reign of the emperor Augustus (reigned 27 BC – 14 AD). There was a military camp at Dorlar and some Roman roadwork. The most important finding however is an uncompleted city (Waldgirmes Forum), which has been excavated since 1993. After their defeat in the battle of the Teutoburg Forest the Romans abandoned the area and withdrew to the Rhine border.

The name "Wetzlar" had come into being most likely by the 3rd century to the 8th century. The last syllable "―lar" suggests that the town was in existence by the 3rd century. The ending may be Celtic or Frankish (in the latter case, most likely referring to wooden defences around the town). The Conradine Gebhard, Count in the Wetterau, and as of 904 Duke of Lorraine, had a Church of the Saviour consecrated in 897, which replaced earlier structures. In the early 10th century came the founding of the Marienstift (monastery).

=== Free Imperial City ===
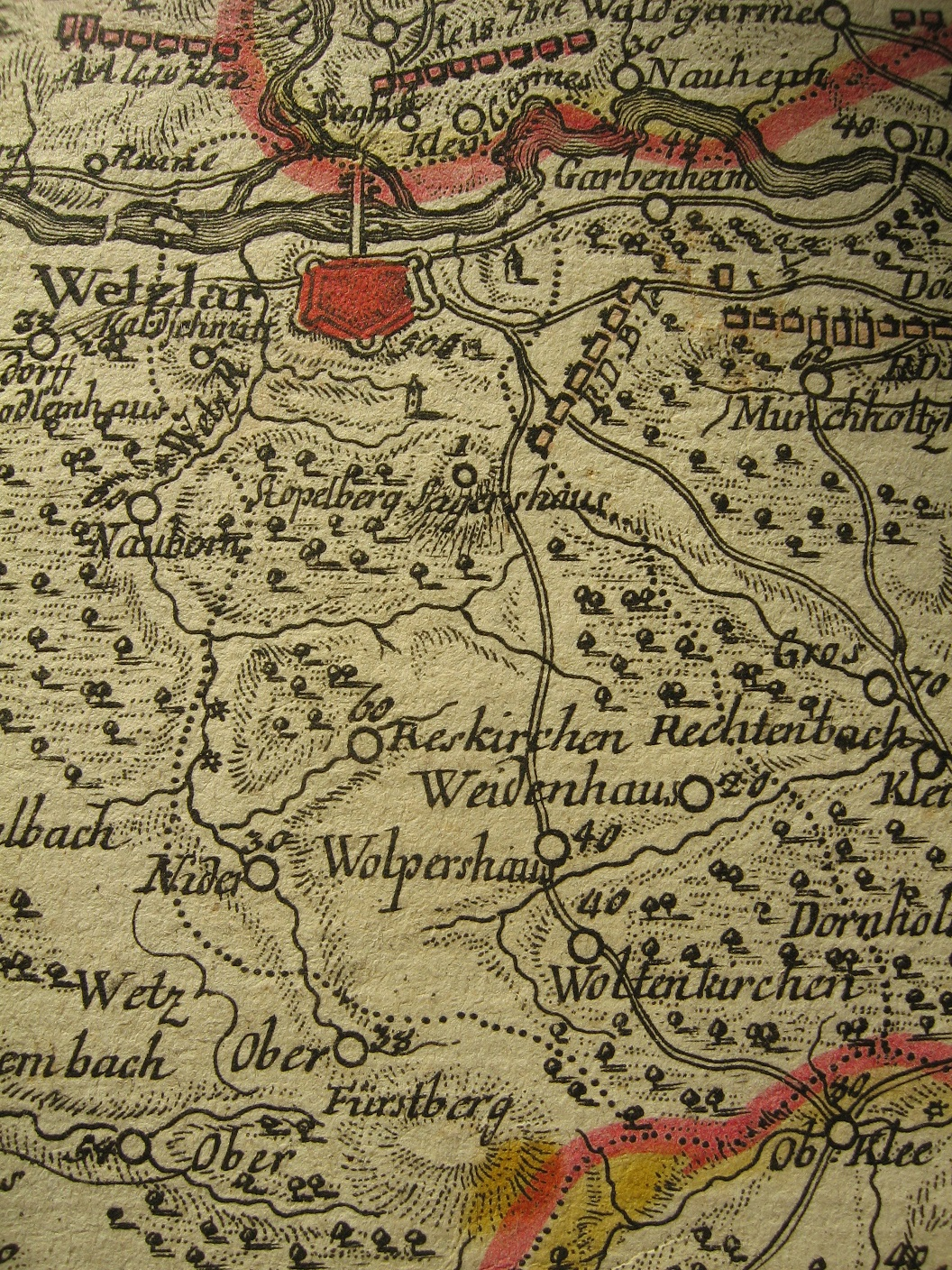
Territory of the Free Imperial City in the 18th century

At some unknown time, Wetzlar was granted market rights, and thereby, the right to levy market dues. Within a year, a market community came into being. The monastery's forerunners were surely part of the crystallization point at which believers, traders and craftsmen met, above all on holidays.

The Hohenstaufen Emperor Frederick I Barbarossa (r. 1152–1190) created a Reichsvogtei (roughly "Imperial Bailiwick"), and in 1180 put Wetzlar's citizens on the same level as Frankfurt's. Wetzlar became a Free Imperial City and kept this distinction until 1803. For the town's protection, and to secure the Wetterau as an Imperial Province, he expanded high above Wetzlar the Imperial Castle (Reichsburg), which had most likely already stood in one form or another before then. The origin of the name "Reichsburg Kalsmunt" is not quite clear. The following explanation cannot be ruled out: Kals- = Karls and munt ≈ vassal, that is, a liege of the Frankish court. Thus it would seem to be a case of a building work from Charlemagne's time ("Charlemagne" is "Karl der Große" – "Charles the Great" (740s–814) – in German). Imperial coinage was struck at Kalsmunt. The commercial road, which crossed the Lahn at Wetzlar, the town's iron production, to which the Iron Market (forum ferri) still bears witness, the wool weaving mill and tanning seemed a good basis on which to develop the town further.

In 1285 the "false emperor" Dietrich Holzschuh, called Tile Kolup, who claimed to be Frederick II, Holy Roman Emperor (who actually had already died in Italy in 1250) came to Wetzlar. When the rightful king, Rudolph I (r. 1273–1291), heard of this and came to Wetzlar, the city leaders seized Tile Kolup and handed him over. He was sentenced as a warlock, a heretic and a blasphemer to a fiery death, which he suffered the next day in Wetzlar at the stake.

Until 1250, most of the town fortifications, whose remains can still be seen today, were complete. By the middle of the 14th century, it is reckoned, the town's population was 6,000, making it by the standards of the time a "city". About 1350, the high point of the town's development in the Middle Ages was reached.

Decades-long feuds with the Counts of Solms, who were trying to make Wetzlar into a Solms-domain city, threatened the vital commercial road. The Emperor supported the town, albeit vainly. The city plunged into debt and in 1387 it fell under forced administration; however, it was incorporated into the Swabian League of Towns. The town's decline led by the end of the Thirty Years' War to a drop in population, to 1,500.

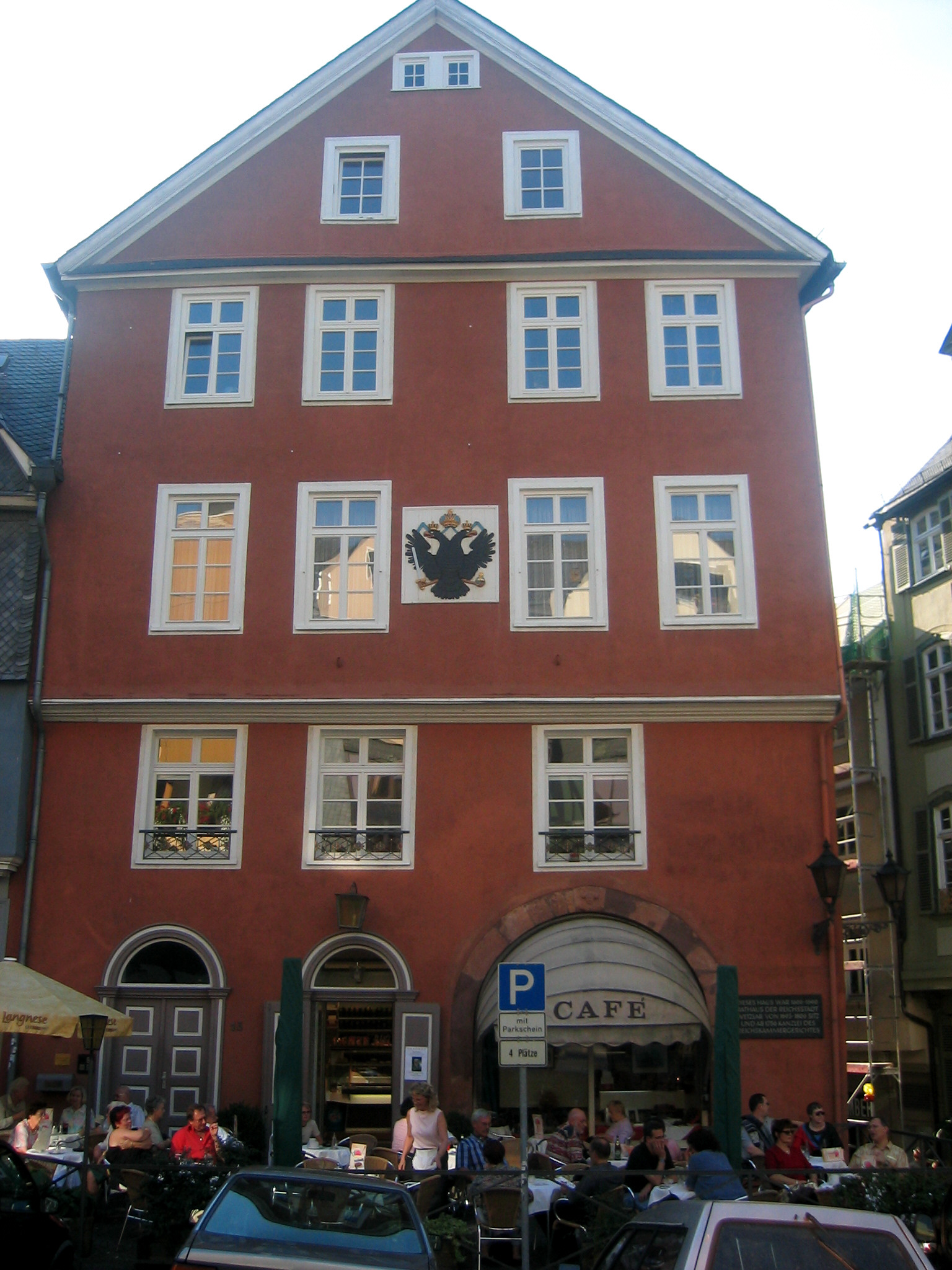
The former seat of the office of the Reichskammergericht

In 1689, the Holy Roman Empire's highest court, the Reichskammergericht (Imperial Chamber Court), was moved from Speyer to Wetzlar after Speyer had been devastated by the French in the War of the Palatinate Succession. Besides Vienna (residence of the Emperor) and Regensburg (seat of the Imperial Diet) Wetzlar thus gained a central function within the Holy Roman Empire and although it remained a tiny town it was regarded as one of its capitals. The court became the town's main employer; at the Empire's dissolution in 1806, it had a staff of about 150 including 20 judges, while a further 750 derived their income from it.

In the summer of 1772, Johann Wolfgang von Goethe was at the Reichskammergericht as a trainee. His novel The Sorrows of Young Werther is inspired by real events which Goethe experienced in Wetzlar. In 1803 Wetzlar came under the rule of Karl Theodor Anton Maria von Dalberg, the Archchancellor of the Holy Roman Empire and a close ally of Napoleon Bonaparte and thus lost its status as a free town. With the Empire's dissolution in 1806, the great court also met its end. It was replaced by a school of law founded by Karl von Dalberg in 1808, which not only continued the Reichskammergericht's function of training constitutional lawyers, but also employed many of the former staff as teachers. A former legal trainee, Franz Stickel (1786–1848), was selected to translate the Code Napoleon that Dalberg introduced in his territories in 1810–11.

After the Congress of Vienna, the area passed to Prussia in 1815, and in 1822 it became the seat of the newly formed district of Wetzlar, which later became an exclave of the Rhine Province.

=== Wetzlar becomes an industrial town ===
Industrialization began once the Lahn was made into a navigable waterway. With the opening of two railway lines in 1862–1863 (the Lahntal railway from Wetzlar to Koblenz and the Cologne-Gießen Railway, the section through Wetzlar is now called the Dill Railway), which met in Wetzlar, the town found itself connected to raw material and outlet markets, becoming an industrial town. The strategic Cannons Railway, which was completed from Berlin to Metz via Wetzlar in 1882, was also sometimes known as the Wetzlar Railway (Wetzlarer Bahn) or Berlin–Wetzlar Railway (Berlin-Wetzlarer Bahn).

In 1869, in the municipal area alone, 100 ore mines were in operation. Wetzlar's first blast furnace, built by the brothers Buderus, went into service in 1872. As well, world-famous optical and precision mechanics companies such as Leitz (Leica), Hensoldt (Zeiss Optronics in the past, now Hensoldt), Pfeiffer Vacuum, Philips, Loh, Seibert, Hollmann, Minox and many others set up shop in the town.

For more than one hundred years, the iron ore found in the Lahn-Dill area (haematite) was processed at the Sophienhütte ironworks. As of 1887, iron ore mines were being shut down one by one, interrupted only by the First World War, because foreign ore from strip mines was being offered at lower prices on the world market. In 1926, mining came to an end altogether.

=== Wetzlar in the 20th century ===
As part of the progressing industrialization, the town outgrew its mediaeval town limits. In 1903 came the amalgamation of Niedergirmes with its extensive industrial works and the railway station neighbourhood. By the end of the First World War, the population had risen to over 15,000. Owing to increasing transportation problems, a ringroad was built to the west of the Old Town (Altstadt), taking the load off the old stone bridge across the Lahn by building a further bridge. In the Second World War, the town, being an industrial stronghold, also became the target of heavy bombing, which destroyed much of the railway station neighbourhood and Niedergirmes. The historic Old Town, however, was mostly spared from the air raids.

After the Second World War ended in 1945, Wetzlar found itself in the American occupation zone, and later, once new boundaries had been drawn, in the Federal State of Hesse. By the beginning of the 1950s, owing to the huge numbers of displaced people from lost territories and refugees flooding into the town, the population had doubled to 30,000.

On 1 January 1977, as part of Hesse's municipal reforms, Wetzlar was united with the neighbouring town of Gießen and fourteen outlying communities to form the city of Lahn. This district-free city had about 156,000 inhabitants. The amalgamation was very unpopular, and after persistent protests – not least of all from Wetzlar – the city of Lahn was dissolved on 31 July 1979, and Wetzlar once again became an independent town. The municipal reforms, however, had been "worth the trouble" for Wetzlar inasmuch as the town gained eight new outlying communities in the deal, making both the town's area and population considerably greater than they had been. Moreover, Wetzlar has since this time been the seat of the Lahn-Dill-Kreis, which also came into being at the same time.

== Politics ==
=== Town council ===
The town council is elected for a five year term. The last election was in 2021.

Parties and voter communities		2021		2016		2011		2006	
Parties and voter communities		Share in %	Seats	Share in %	Seats	Share in %	Seats	Share in %	Seats
CDU	Christian Democratic Union	27.3	16	26.6	16	29.5	17	36.0	21
SPD	Social Democratic Party of Germany	28.7	17	32.2	19	34.9	21	39.1	23
Greens	Alliance '90/The Greens	13.1	8	9.0	5	14.7	9	8.0	5
FDP	Free Democratic Party	7.0	4	9.9	6	7.6	5	6.8	4
FWG/FW	Free Voters	7.9	7	10.3	6	9.2	5	10.1	6
AfD	Alternative for Germany	6.3	4						
LINKE	The Left	5.4	3	4.2	2	4.1	2		
NPD	National Democratic Party of Germany	1.2	1	7.7	5				
Die PARTEI	Die PARTEI	3.2							
total		100	59	100	59	100	59	100	59

=== Coat of arms ===
Wetzlar's civic coat of arms might heraldically be described thus: In gules a spreadeagle sable armed, langued and crowned Or, over its wing dexter a cross pattée argent.

The black Imperial eagle on a red background and with a golden crown stands for the town's former Imperial immediacy as a Free Imperial City (see History). The silver cross stands for the former Imperial City's right to mint coins. The arms are almost unchanged from those borne in the 12th century.

A new version of the coat of arms was to have been introduced in 2003, but it did not catch on. In the end, the "old" arms were kept.

== Transport ==
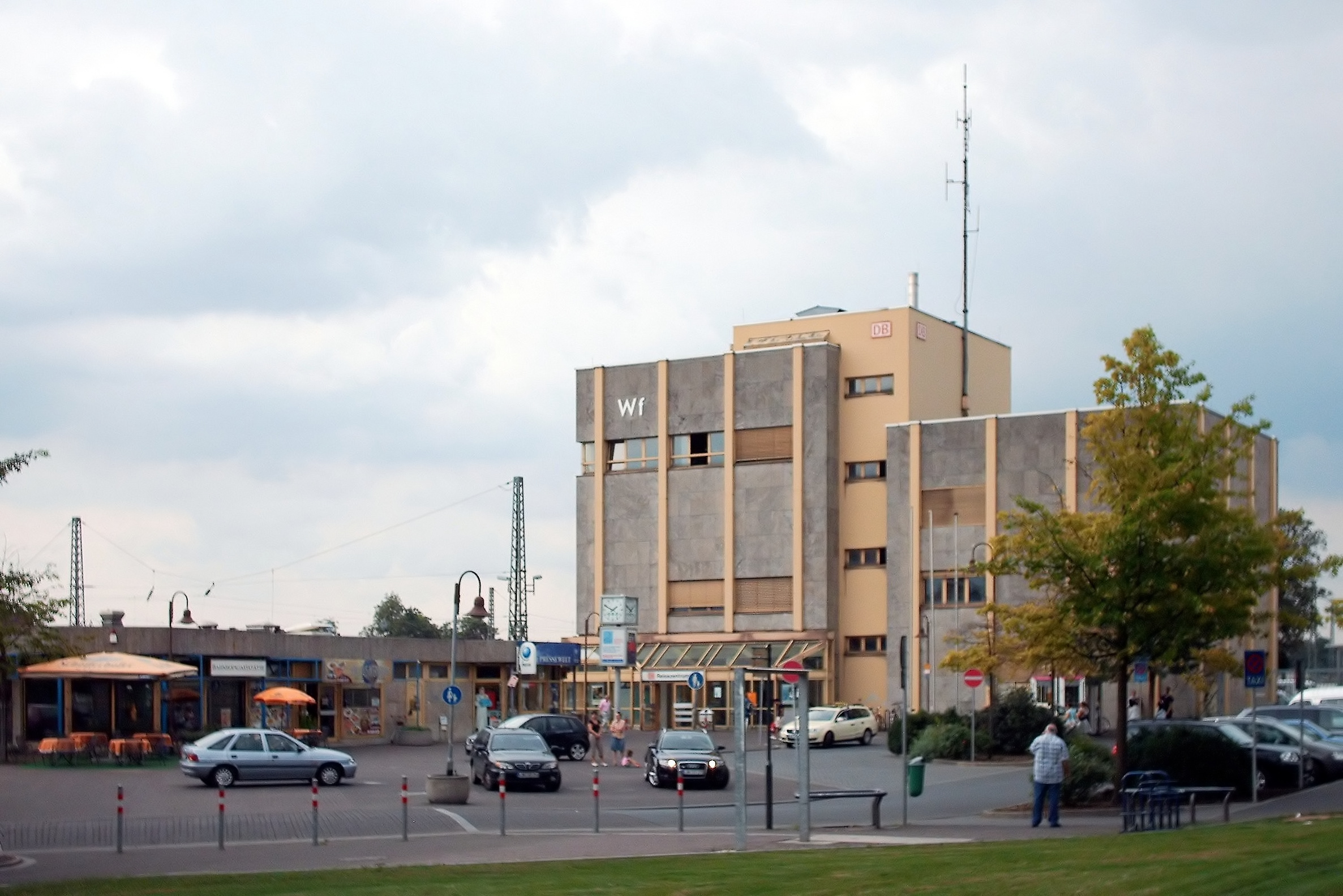
Wetzlar railway station.

Motorways
Wetzlar lies on the A45 (Sauerland-line Dortmund – Aschaffenburg) with the junctions Wetzlarer Kreuz [Wetzlar Cross] (to A480 to Wetzlar-North, Asslar and Wetzlar-Blasbach), Wetzlar-Ost [Wetzlar-East] (to B49 in direction city centre) and Wetzlar-Süd [Wetzlar-South] (into the southern quarters Münchholzhausen and Dutenhofen). The motorway A480 should actually lead from the Luxembourg border over Trier through the Westerwald up to the Hattenbacher Dreieck ([Hattenbach Triangle] to the A7). This distance was planned as A48. Because of high costs it was never completely realized. Now the B49 are to take up the traffic. Today the part of the A48 between Gießen and Wetzlar is called A480 and leads only from the departure Wetzlar-North/Asslar up to the Wetzlarer Cross and beyond that up to the present motorway end with the improvised exit after Wetzlar-Blasbach. Some kilometres to the northeast of Gießen the part removed so far continues and leads from Heuchelheim to the Reiskirchener Dreieck [Reiskirchen Triangle] at the A5.
Federal highways
The following federal highways lead through the city: B49 (Trier – Wetzlar – Alsfeld) in direction east–west and B277 (Siegen-Dillenburg-Wetzlar) as north-south connection. The B277a is rather a bypass road, it connects Asslar with Wetzlar-Dalheim. Between Wetzlar and Limburg (B49) the federal route is currently being expanded from one lane to two in each direction.
Railways
Wetzlar lies on the railroad lines Frankfurt am Main – Siegen – Cologne and Gießen – Limburg – Koblenz, which meet at Wetzlar station and are operated by RegionalBahn and RegionalExpress-trains. Since 2009 every morning and evening a EuroCity stops on its way to Klagenfurt or rather to Siegen. Beside the station Wetzlar, a further station exists in Dutenhofen. The earlier station in Wetzlar-Garbenheim was closed when this route to Wetzlar was shut down. The freight station has become smaller; since February 2007, Railion operates freight trains for central Hesse. Larger cities, which are directly reachable from Wetzlar are: Aachen, Cologne, Koblenz, Frankfurt am Main, Munich, Salzburg, Siegen and Stuttgart.
Public transport
The city has a well organised urban bus network with twelve lines, all connecting to the central bus station (ZOB), in addition various lines handle the overland traffic into the surrounding countryside of Wetzlar. In the late evening hours the night bus line 007, the so-called DiscoBus, serves nearly all parts of the city. On all lines, the RMV pricing applies. Additionally the CityBus links the Old Town for 50c, weekdays from 10:00 to 19:00 and on workdays to 15:00 with the station and the shopping centre FORUM Wetzlar every 20 minutes.
Airports
The distance to Frankfurt Airport is about 70 km (43 mi), to the regional airport Siegen approx. 40 km (25 mi).

== Economy and business ==
=== Retailing ===
According to the figures of the Society for Consumer Research Wetzlar is one of the most attractive commercial locations in Germany. The city has a high centrality coefficient and a retail turnover of around EUR 10,000 per inhabitant. In Germany it takes third place among all cities with over 50,000 inhabitants.

Wetzlar has two large shopping centres, of those the FORUM Wetzlar is the largest in central Hesse (Mittelhessen). It has around 110 shops and accommodates a large multi-storey car park of 1700 places. Retail trade is located mainly in the areas Bahnhofsstraße, Karl-Kellner-Ring and the historic old town. In the Bahnhofstraße, the Karl-Kellner-Ring and in the two shopping centres where almost all goods are available.

=== Enterprises ===
The city is home to some internationally active and well known enterprises. The Buderus company was created in the year 1731 and is one of the oldest still existing (large) enterprises. As BBT Thermotechnik, now part of the Bosch group, Buderus was for many decades one of the largest employers in the central Hessian area with more than 10,000 persons employed in Wetzlar alone (worldwide over 16,000), working in the areas casting (with cement), high-grade steel and heating technologies. Economic changes, repeated shifts of the stock majority as well as close-downs and sales of various divisions have strongly changed the company in the meantime. However, it ranks among the largest enterprises in Hesse. Wetzlar is apart from Jena and Oberkochen a German centre for optics as well as the most important German location for the precision engineering industry. The manufactured products have gained worldwide reputation. One of the most important companies in the area of microscopy is Leica Microsystems (formerly known as Ernst Leitz), which in its peak times employed over 7000 people in the city. Small format (35 mm) photography was invented in Wetzlar, and Leica cameras are well known for their excellent quality. In addition there are cameras of the companies Leidolf and Minox, binoculars and telescopes made by the company Hensoldt AG (now Carl Zeiss), part of the Zeiss group (over 2,000 people employed in peak times). Other well-known firms are Philips (with about 1,200 employed at times) or Siemens AG and Siemens VDO, since 2007 Continental AG or the Sancura BKK, a supraregional health insurance company, which is combined with the Taunus BKK. The Business park Spilburg, former barracks, became home to a number of innovative enterprises, particularly in the area of optics/precision mechanics, information technology and services. Additionally, areas in the Westend as well as the Hörnsheimer Eck and the Dillfeld are available for new businesses to set up.

== Education system ==
Wetzlar offers a wide variety of educational paths students can choose from.

=== Nurseries ===
Traditionally a child's education starts in one of Wetzlar's 18 nurseries. There are public and private nurseries and religiously influenced ones. Children will spend between one and four years in one of these day cares, until they move on to an elementary school.

=== Elementary school ===
Wetzlar has around 12 elementary schools. This includes private schools and schools, who are dedicated to special needs children. Most elementary schools offer an afterschool day care program for students, whose parents are at work longer than the school day. In addition to these programs, the city has public day care facilities that provide afterschool care. The afterschool program consists of warm meals, tutors who help with homework and playtime. Kita Marienheim is an example. After spending four years in elementary school, students are off to middle school.

=== Secondary school ===
The middle (secondary) school system in Germany is quite extravagant, Wetzlar being no exception. There are three branches of middle school. The Gymnasium (comparable to A-Levels), Realschule (normal secondary school) and Hauptschule (lowest secondary school). Wetzlar has four secondary schools. The August-Bebel-Gesamtschule and the Eichendorfschule are so-called Gesamtschulen. They offer all three branches of secondary school. The Freiherr-vom-Stein Schule is a gymnasium (A-Level). The Steinschule recently changed from a G8 program, graduation after Grade 9, to a G9 program, graduation after Grade 10. It has a special program dedicated to science and sports classes. When applying to the school, students can decide if they'd like to join a sports class, a science class or a regular class. If they join a special class they will enjoy benefits, such as a whole day dedicated to their chosen subject (science or sports) and different fieldtrips. Next to the Steinschule is the Schule an der Brühlsbacher Warte. It is a school for special needs children. It is specialized in helping children with disabilities learn basic and career relevant skills.

Upon completing Grade 10, students face a critical juncture in their educational and professional trajectories. They are presented with several pathways, including pursuing higher education, entering the workforce, undertaking vocational apprenticeships, or taking a gap year. Most students choose to pursue their education and go to one of Wetzlar's High Schools.

=== Upper secondary education ===
Wetzlar is home to three upper secondary schools. The Käthe-Kollwitz Schule is a vocational center, which is specialized in nutrition, health, personal hygiene, and social affairs. The school is named after Mrs. Käthe Kollwitz (1919–1945), a German artist. The Thedor-Heuss-Schule Wetzlar is a 'Fachhochschule' or 'kaufmännische Berufsschule', which can be roughly translated into 'commercial vocational school'. They primarily focus on health and economic education. It is named after the first Federal President of the Federal Republic of Germany, Theodor Heuss (1884–1963). Named after the Johann Wolfang Goethe (1749–1832), a famous German writer and statesman, the Goetheschule Wetzlar it is the biggest upper secondary school in Hesse with over 1000 students and ca. 110 staff members. It is well known for its varieties of subjects and extracurricular activities, such as multiple language exchanges and class fieldtrips.

Before 2019 all three schools were sharing one facility that consisted of three smaller buildings connected by hallways, a shared auditorium and kiosk. Shortly before the new school year in 2019, the Goetheschule Wetzlar moved into a separate building. The old one was demolished, and the construction of the new school facility began. It is expected to be completed in 2021.

=== Higher education ===
The Technische Hochschule Mittelhessen is one of the largest universities of applied sciences in Germany. The campus in Wetzlar is located in a redeveloped former military barracks area. The Zentrum Dualer Hochschulstudien (ZDH) has been offering the StudiumPlus since 25 April 2001. StudiumPlus is a dual university degree, which is a cooperation between the TH Mittelhessen and the Chamber of Industry and Commerce. The cooperation includes over 1000 partner companies in the region. The dual study currently consists of seven bachelor's degree programs such as business administration, engineering / mechanical engineering, engineering / electrical engineering, civil engineering, software technology, organizational management in medicine and industrial engineering as well as the three master's degree programs in process management, systems engineering and technical sales.

== Twin towns – sister cities ==
Wetzlar is twinned with:

- Avignon, France
- Colchester, United Kingdom
- Ilmenau, Germany
- Neukölln (Berlin), Germany
- Písek, Czech Republic
- Reith bei Kitzbühel, Austria
- Schladming, Austria
- Siena, Italy

=== Sponsorships ===
Wetzlar also sponsors:

- Dori, Burkina Faso

== Sightseeing ==
=== Historic Old Town ===
The tightly woven ensemble of historic buildings and houses in the Old Town (Altstadt) with its half-timbered houses and stone buildings from Romanesque (Wetzlar Cathedral) to Gothic to Renaissance and Baroque is to a great extent as it was in the late 18th century, preserved and extensively restored. Thus the great squares of Buttermarkt/Domplatz ("Butter Market/Cathedral Square"), Fischmarkt ("Fish Market"), Eisenmarkt ("Iron Market"), Kornmarkt ("Grain Market"), and the former Franziskanerhof ("Franciscan Yard"), now called Schillerplatz. From the roughly 50 noteworthy buildings, a few are listed here:

- A straight-walled half-timbered house from 1356
- The "Old Coin" (Alte Münze) at the Iron Market
- The "Roman Emperor" (Römische Kaiser) from the 15th century, a former theatre and ballroom
- The former Teutonic Knights' Court (Deutschordenshof), today a town museum
- The Lottehaus, Charlotte Buff's house
- The Jerusalemhaus in which Karl Wilhelm Jerusalem shot himself, thus attaining sad fame as Werther
- The princely Palais Papius in which is nowadays found the collection of historical furniture assembled by Dr Irmgard Freiin von Lemmers-Danforth

Also in the old outlying towns of Langgasse and Neustadt ("New Town"), connected to the Old Town by the Old Lahn Bridge (Alte Lahnbrücke), a number of historic buildings are preserved and are worth seeing. The New Town, however, has lost its mediaeval feel owing to its 20th-century four-lane roads.

The stone Alte Lahnbrücke was first mentioned in 1288. A building meant to serve as the town hall, built in the mid 14th century, was used by the Reichskammergericht as their seat and offices from 1689 to 1806, after many remodellings. Considerable remains of the town's 13th- and 14th-century fortifications are still preserved, for instance a fortress tower known as the Schneiderturm ("Tailor's Tower") or Säuturm ("Sow's Tower"), the Kalsmuntpforte ("Kalsmunt Gate" – see History) which was the town gate for the earlier suburb of Silhofen, as well as large sections of the town wall.

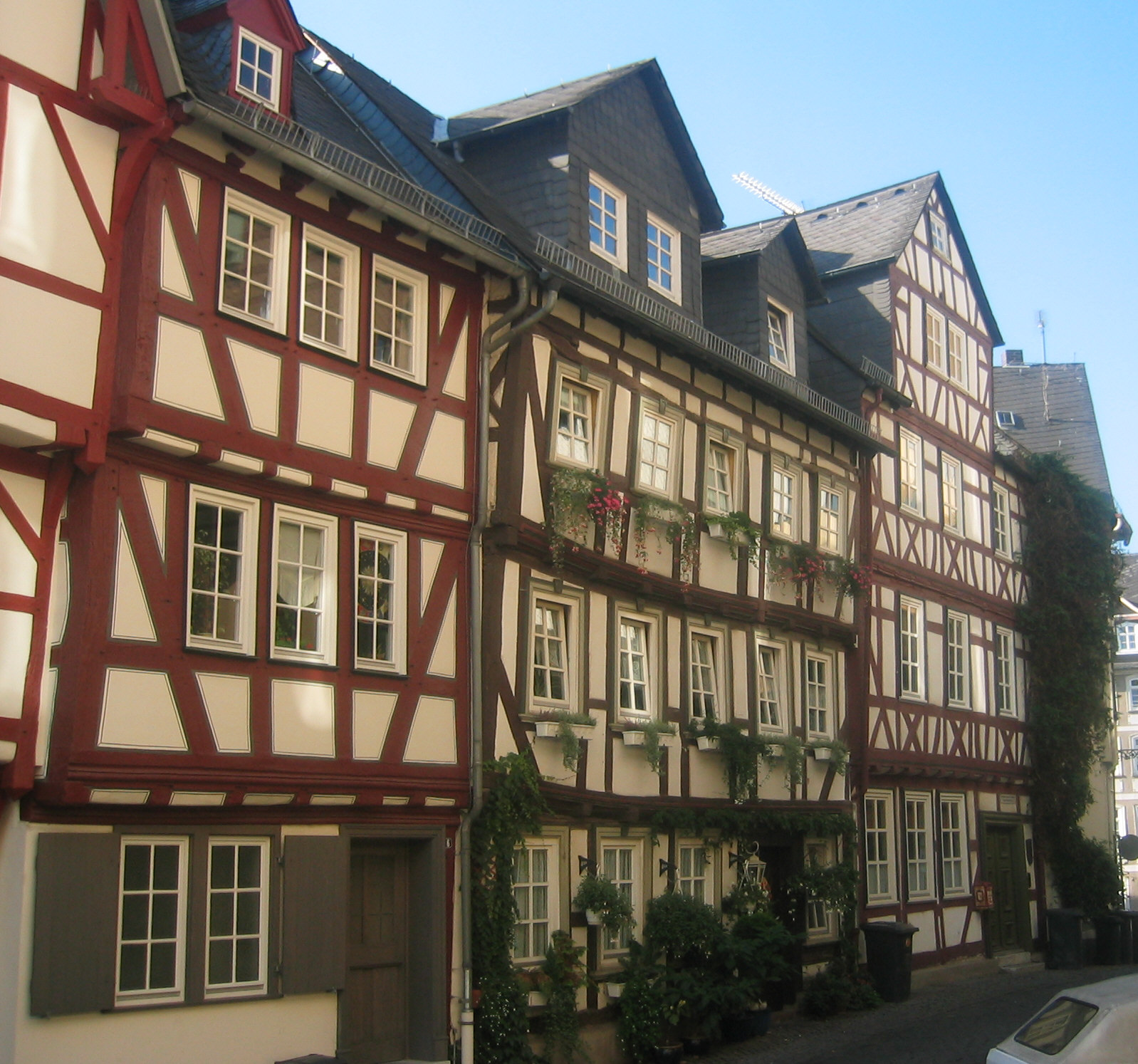
In the Old Town

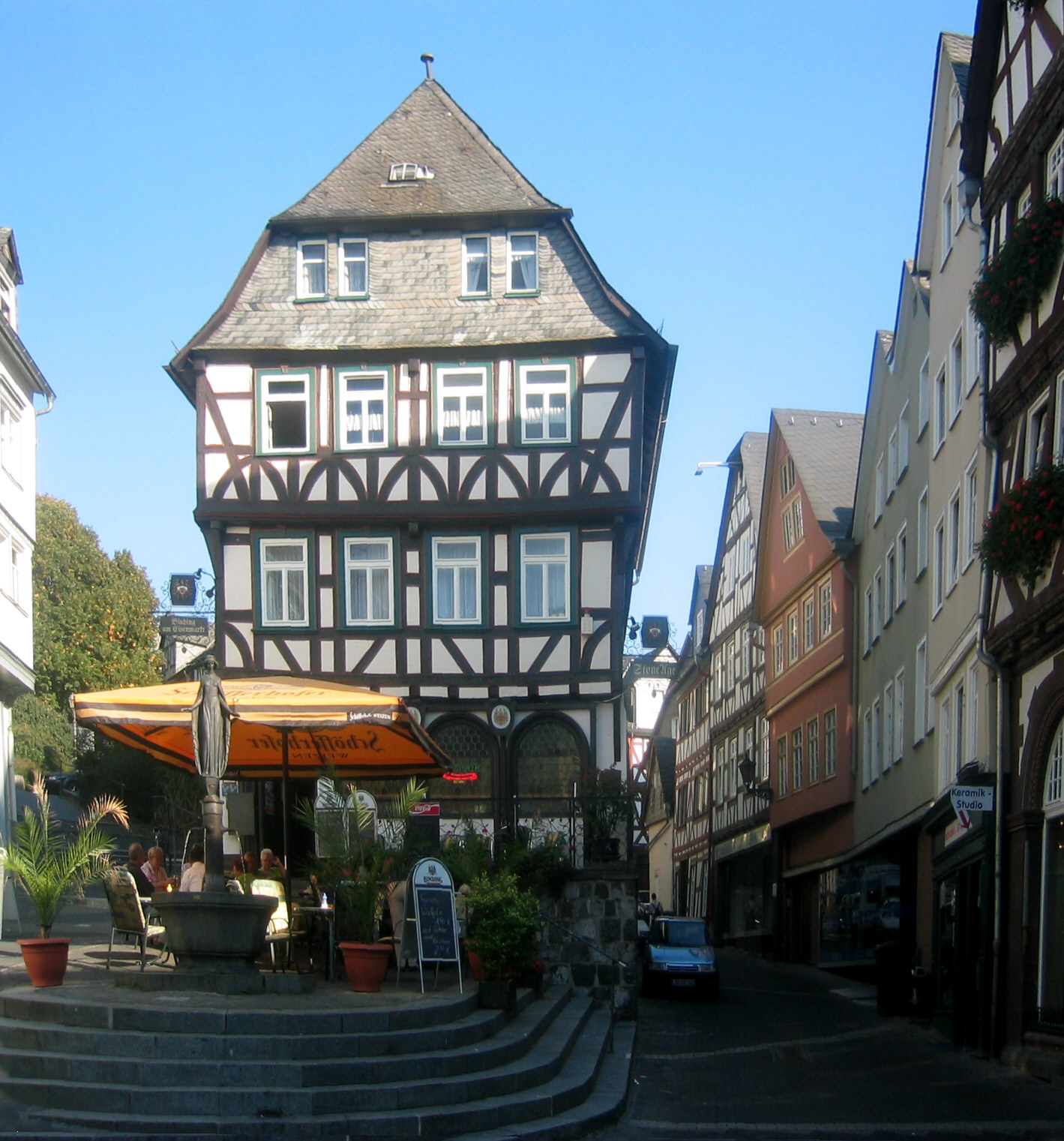
In the Old Town

==== Wetzlar Cathedral ====
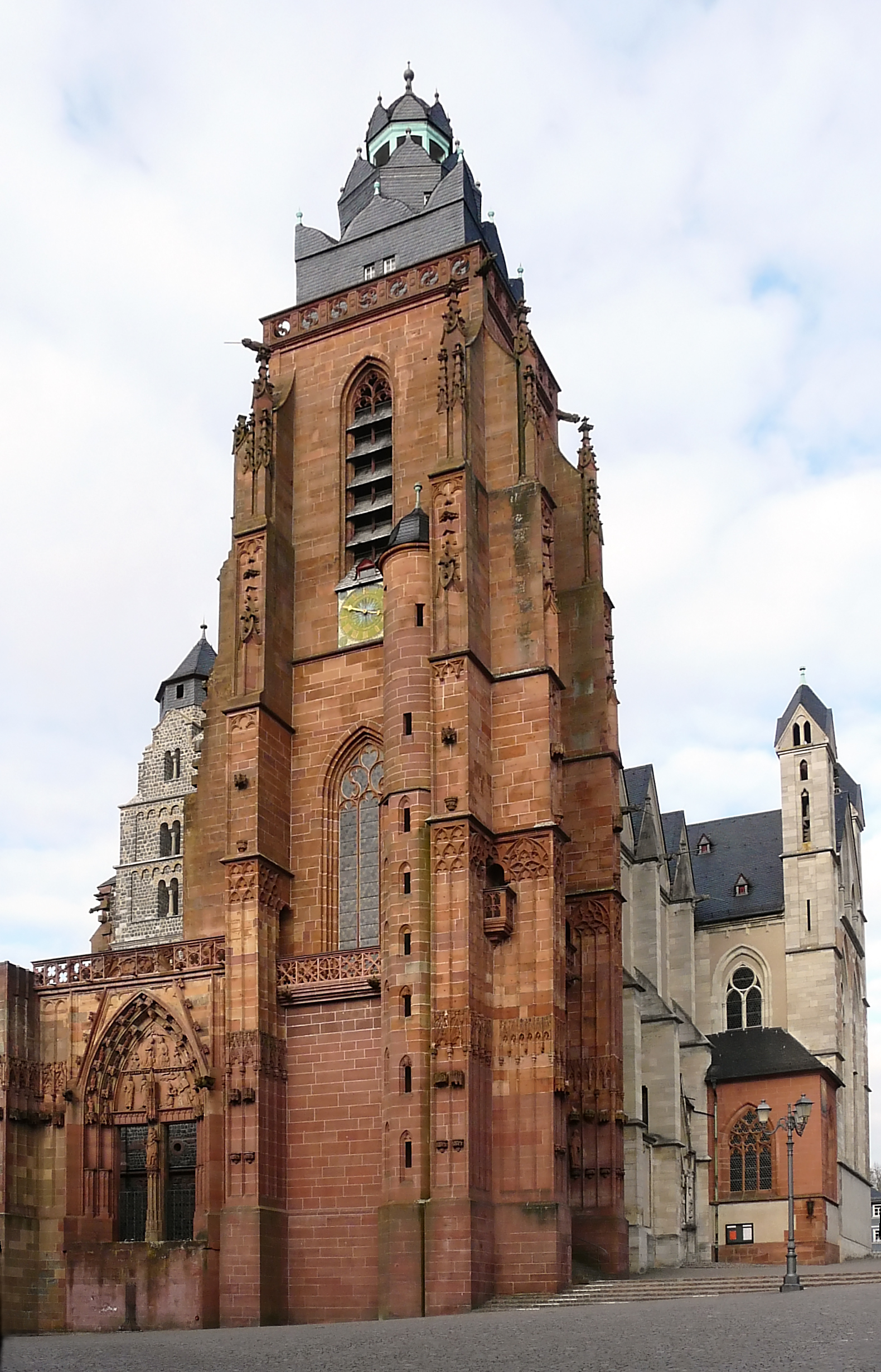
Wetzlar Cathedral

The Wetzlarer Dom (Wetzlar Cathedral) is one of Wetzlar's landmark buildings. Building work began on the cathedral in 1230 and is still not finished. It is the successor to a former "Church of the Saviour" consecrated in 897. The monastery and parish church was called Cathedral as of the late 17th century. This designation was acquired during the time that the Reichskammergericht was active in Wetzlar (1693–1806), when the Elector-Archbishop of Trier was Monastery Provost, making the church a "Bishop's Church".

== Culture ==
The Phantastische Bibliothek Wetzlar (Fantastic Library of Wetzlar) is one of the largest public libraries specialising in fantastic literature worldwide, it is the largest in Europe. It is generally a reference library, open for the public and scientists.

Arena Wetzlar is a multi-functional arena and is primarily used for pop concerts, shows and team handball and is the home arena of HSG Wetzlar (Handball Bundesliga).

Every summer, operas, music and drama are performed in the open air at the Freilichtbühne during the month-long Wetzlar Festival ("Wetzlarer Festspiele").

== Notable people ==
- Friedrich Sixt von Armin (1851–1936), Prussian general
- Yitzchak Huberman (1896 – 1977) served as rabbi of the displaced persons' camp for six years
- Barbara Lüdemann, politician (1922–1992)
- Klaus Enders (1937–2019), sidecar racer, world champion
- Jörg Siebert (born 1944), rower, Olympic champion
- Patrick Bernhardt (born 1971), racing driver
- Lukas Müller (born 1987), rower, Olympic champion
- Mareike Adams (born 1990), rower
- Cenk Tosun (born 1991), Turkish footballer
