= Charlotte Buff =

Model of Goethe's "Lotte"

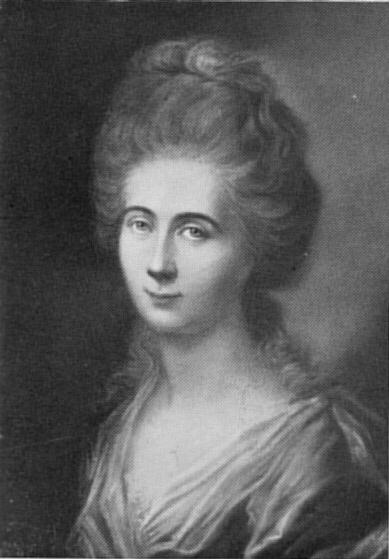
- Charlotte Buff-Kestner by Johann Heinrich Schröder
- Born: 11 January 1753; Wetzlar
- Died: 16 January 1828 (aged 75); Hanover

Charlotte Sophie Henriette Kestner (née Buff, 11 January 1753, Wetzlar – 16 January 1828, Hanover) was a youthful acquaintance of the poet Goethe, who fell in love with her. She rejected him and instead married Johann Christian Kestner (1741–1800), vice-archivist and privy councillor to the Hanoverian court. The character of Charlotte, in Goethe's novel The Sorrows of Young Werther, is partly based on her. Their relationship was characterized by heartiness and lack of constraint. Goethe bought the wedding rings for her and Kestner, in Frankfurt am Main. Charlotte and Kestner had four daughters and eight sons, among them August Kestner. Thomas Mann wrote a novel, published in 1939, "Lotte in Weimar", about a trip she made to Weimar in 1816 when she was 62 and a widow to see her family and also to meet Goethe.

== Film portrayal ==
In the 2010 German film Young Goethe in Love, the character of Charlotte Buff is portrayed by Miriam Stein.
