= Goetheforschung =

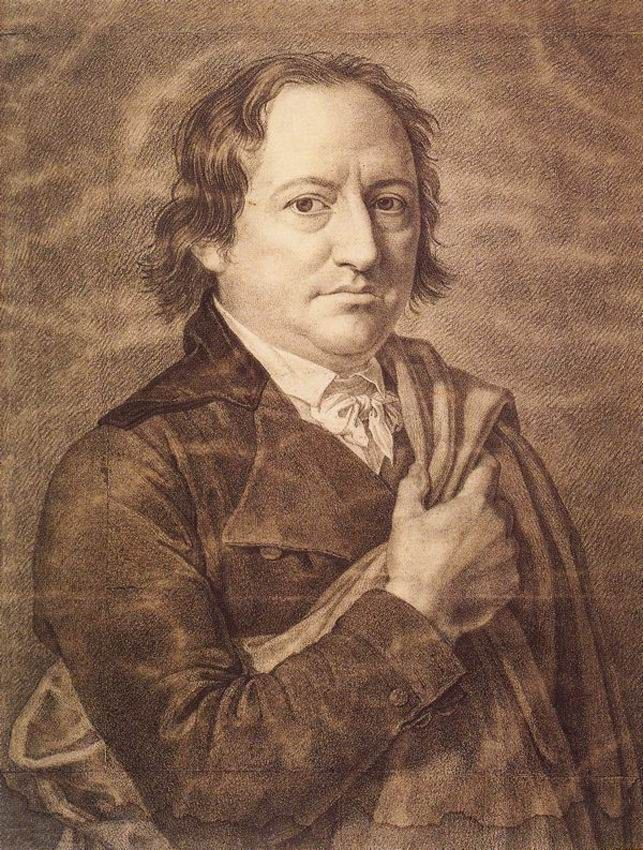

Goetheforschung (also Goethe-Forschung, literally "Goethe-research") is a German term originating in the 19th century for the Goethe Movement, centering on both amateur and academic study of the life of Johann Wolfgang von Goethe. Study and research is often done privately and facilitated through Goethe societies such as the Goethe-Institut. Such societies are dedicated to preserving the memory of Goethe in the public consciousness.

The name of no other German poet resonates in the public mind as much as Goethe's, and he is held in an esteem approaching that accorded to Shakespeare in the realm of literature, Michelangelo, in sculpture, or Beethoven in musical composition. In the 19th century, Goetheforschung was associated with non-academic enthusiasts and collectors such as Woldemar von Biedermann who sought personal betterment and enrichment through immersion in Goethe's life and works. In communist East Germany, Goetheforschung was upheld as part of the regime's conservative cultural policy (German: Kulturpolitik) promoting Weimar classicism as the foundation of Germany's cultural heritage. In modern Germany and elsewhere, Goethe is often far better known than read.

Researchers have even paid intense attention to even Goethe's non-literary and incidental works, such as his scientific writings and everyday correspondence, as exemplified in the critical commentary to the 1950s Leopoldina complete edition of Goethe's works.

== Notable Figures ==
- Woldemar von Biedermann (1817–1903), jurist and literary historian.
- Rudolf Steiner (1861–1925), esoteric philosopher.
- Hans Gerhard Gräf (1864–1942), an editor of the authoritative Weimar complete edition of Goethe's work.
- Hans Sachse (1906–1985), member of the Weimar Goethe-Gesellschaft.
- Naoji Kimura (born 1934), lecturer at the Sophia University, Tokyo.

== See also ==
- Goethe-Handbuch
