= Waldemar von Wasielewski =

German writer

Waldemar von Wasielewski (10 December 1875 – 28 February 1959) was a German writer who specialized in the occult, Goethe research, and the history of music.

== Life ==
Wasielewski was born in 1875 in Bonn. His father, Wilhelm Joseph von Wasielewski (1822–1896), was a prominent violinist, conductor and music editor. He studied natural science, history of literature, History of art, and philosophy at the universities of Bonn and Berlin, earning a doctorate in Botany in 1899. He habilitated at the University of Rostock as a private lecturer from 1899-1905.

As a freelance writer, his efforts fell on music historical themes, Goethe, and especially the occult. The publisher Piper issued a volume of his poetry in 1909.

His first encounters with the field of occultism may be dated to 1912, primarily to the symptoms of telepathy reported in Sir Oliver Lodge's book The Survival of Man. In Wasielewski's first writing on the subject, Wass muss jedermann vom Occultismus wissen (1915) [What everyone should know about the occult], the author tried to reconcile scientific methods to occult phenomena.

In 1916 Wasielewski married Maria von Bloedau (1883–1963), whose mediumship led him to deepen his telepathic studies. In his main work on the subject, Telepathie und Hellsehen [Telepathy and clairvoyance] he attempted to prove the phenomena through scientific methods and testing, aided by his wife's telepathic abilities. Involved in these experiments was the doctor and parapsychologist Rudolf Tischner (1879–1961).

A correspondence developed between Wasielewski and the poet Rainer Maria Rilke from Rilke's reaction to Telepathie und Hellsehen, which the famous poet read shortly after completing the Duino Elegies.

Wasielewski died on 28 February 1959 in Sondershausen.

== Primary works ==
- Theoretische und experimentelle Beiträge zur Kenntnis der Amitose , Leipzig (1902).
- Goethe und die Descendenzlehre , Frankfurt (1903).
- Robert Schumann, Eine Biographie , Leipzig (1906). (Revised edition of his father's biography of Schumann)
- Artur Volkmann, Eine Einführung in sein Werk , München Leipzig (1908).
- Der Regenbogen, Poems, Piper Munich (1909).
- Goethes meteorologische Studien , Leipzig (1910).
- Was muss jedermann vom Occultismus wissen , Leipzig (1915).
- Telepathie und Hellsehen, Versuche und Betrachtungen über ungewöhnliche seelische Fähigkeiten , Halle (1921).
- Einleitung zu Goethes naturwissenschaftlichen Schriften, Zur Farbenlehre in: Goethes Werke, Berlin (1927).
- Die Violine und ihre Meister , Leipzig (1927). (Revised edition of his father's work)
- Goethes Ehe, in: Goethes Ehe in Briefen, Potsdam (1936).
- Remote Viewing, Versuche und Betrachtungen zu Fähigkeiten wie Telepathie und Hellsehen , Leipzig (2006).ISBN 978-3-89094-491-3 (Republication of the title Telepathie und Hellsehen)

== Bibliography ==
- Rudolf Tischner: Über Telepathie und Hellsehen, Experimentaltheoretische Untersuchungen , Munich (1920)
- Erich H. Müller: Deutsches Musikerlexikon , Dresden (1929)
- Richard Baerwald: Gedankenlesen und Hellsehen , Berlin (1933)
- Alfred Winterstein: Telepathie und Hellsehen im Lichte der modernen Forschung und wissenschaftlichen Kritik , Vienna (1948)
- Werner F. Bonin: Lexikon der Parapsychologie und ihrer Grenzgebiete , Bern and Munich (1976)
