= Ganymed (Goethe) =

Poem by Johann Wolfgang von Goethe

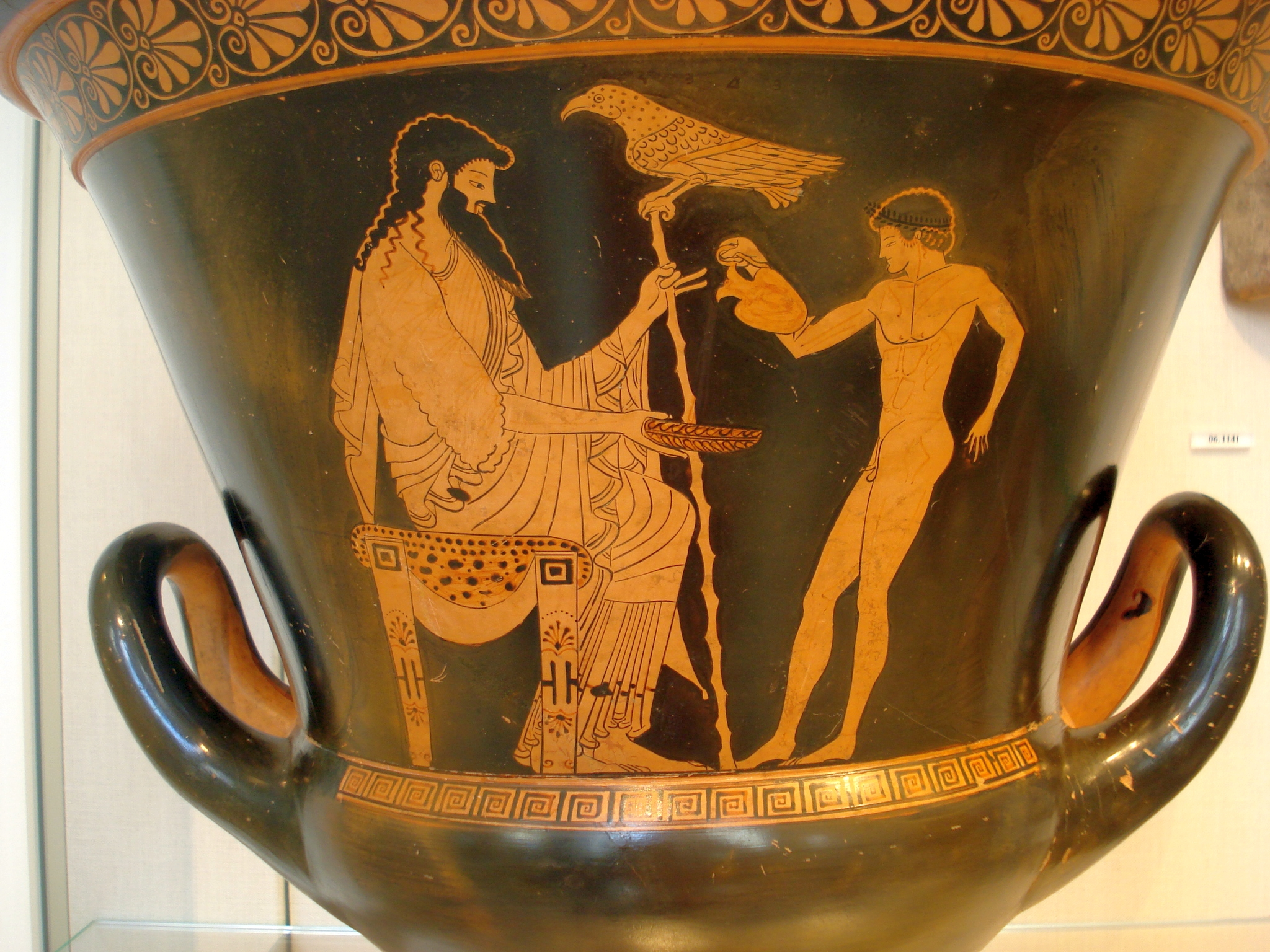
Ganymede pouring Zeus a libation (490–480 BC)

"Ganymed" is a poem by Johann Wolfgang von Goethe, in which the character of the mythic youth Ganymede is seduced by God (or Zeus) through the beauty of Spring.

In early editions of the Collected Works it appeared in Volume II of Goethe's poems in a section of Vermischte Gedichte (assorted poems), shortly following the "Gesang der Geister über den Wassern", and the Harzreise im Winter. It immediately follows "Prometheus", and the two poems together should be understood as a pair, one expressing the sentiment of divine love, the other misotheism. Both belong to the period 1770 to 1775. Prometheus is the creative and rebellious spirit which, rejected by God, angrily defies him and asserts itself; Ganymede is the boyish self which is adored and seduced by God. One is the lone defiant, the other the yielding acolyte. As the humanist poet, Goethe presents both identities as aspects or forms of the human condition.

The poem was set to music, among others, by Franz Schubert (D. 544, 1817), Carl Loewe (Op. 81, No. 5, for SATB, 1836–1837), and by Hugo Wolf (1891).

== Text ==
Wie im Morgenglanze
Du rings mich anglühst,
Frühling, Geliebter!
Mit tausendfacher Liebeswonne
Sich an mein Herz drängt
Deiner ewigen Wärme
Heilig Gefühl,
Unendliche Schöne!

Daß ich dich fassen möcht'
In diesen Arm!

Ach, an deinem Busen
Lieg' ich, schmachte,
Und deine Blumen, dein Gras
Drängen sich an mein Herz.
Du kühlst den brennenden
Durst meines Busens,
Lieblicher Morgenwind!
Ruft drein die Nachtigall
Liebend nach mir aus dem Nebeltal.
Ich komm', ich komme!
Wohin? Ach, wohin?

Hinauf! Hinauf strebt's.
Es schweben die Wolken
Abwärts, die Wolken
Neigen sich der sehnenden Liebe.
Mir! Mir!
In eurem Schosse
Aufwärts!
Umfangend umfangen!
Aufwärts an deinen Busen,
Alliebender Vater!

How, in the morning brightness,
You all around shine at me,
Springtime, Beloved!
With thousandfold love-bliss
The holy feeling
Of your eternal warmth
Presses itself upon my heart,
Unending beauty!

Could I but embrace you
In this arm!

Ah, upon your breast
I lie, languish,
And your blossoms, your grass
press upon my heart.
You cool the burning
Thirst of my bosom,
Lovely morning-wind!
There calls the nightingale
Lovingly for me from the misty vale.
I come, I come!
Whither, ah whither?

Up! Up it surges.
The clouds are leaning
Downwards, the clouds
Bow down to yearning love.
To me! To me!
In your lap, clouds,
Upwards!
Embracing, embraced!
Upwards to thy bosom,
All-loving Father!

== Sources ==
- J. W. Goethe, Goethe's Werke: Vollständige Ausgabe letzter Hand (Vol II, 79–80). (J. G. Cotta'sche Buchhandlung, Stuttgart and Tübingen 1827).
- J. W. Goethe, Gedichte (Aufbau-Verlag, Berlin and Weimar 1988). ISBN 3-351-00103-7.
