= Love of God =

Concepts of worship and devotions towards God

Love of God can mean either love for God or love by God. Love for God (philotheia) is associated with the concepts of worship, and devotions towards God.

The Greek term theophilia means the love or favour of God, and theophilos means friend of God, originally in the sense of being loved by God or loved by the gods; but is today sometimes understood in the sense of showing love for God.

The Greek term agape is applied both to the love that human beings have for God and to the love that God has for them.

== Baháʼí Faith ==
The teachings of the Baháʼí Faith hold that the love of God (philanthropia). ʻAbdu'l-Bahá, the son of the founder of the religion wrote: "There is nothing greater or more blessed than the Love of God! It gives healing to the sick, balm to the wounded, joy and consolation to the whole world, and through it alone can man attain Life Everlasting. The essence of all religions is the Love of God, and it is the foundation of all the sacred teachings."

== Christianity ==
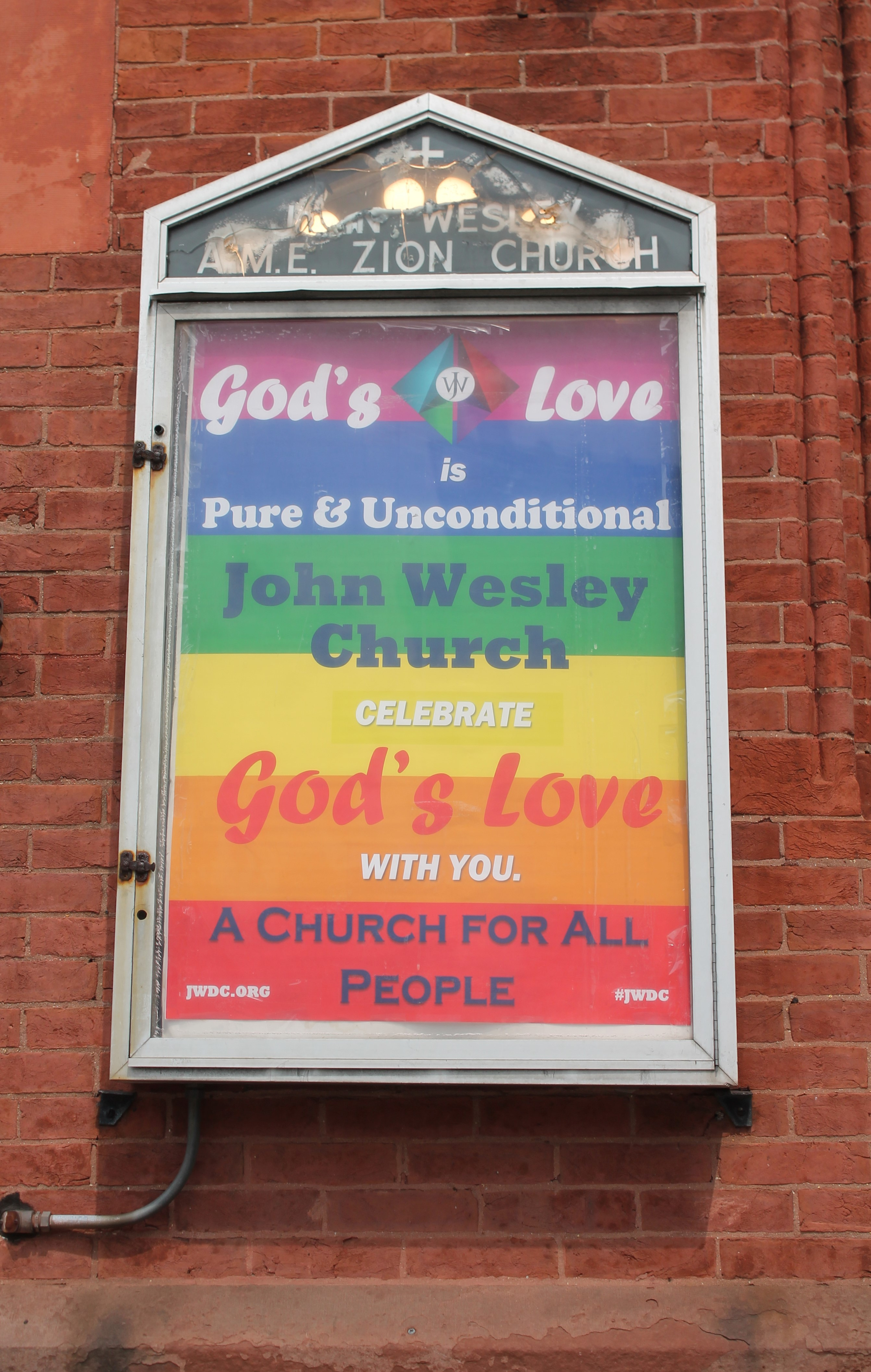

The Old Testament uses a rich vocabulary to express the love of God, as a concept that appears in many instances. The Lord expresses his love through the Old Testament prophet Jeremiah and says, "I have loved you with an everlasting love; I have drawn you with loving kindness" (Jeremiah 31:2). However, the exegesis of the love of God in the Old Testament has presented problems for modern scholars. The love of God appears in a number of texts (e.g. Hosea 1–3, and then in Ezek 16 and Isa 62) but resolving the references to produce a consistent interpretation has been challenging and subject to debate.

Emeritus Professor of New Testament at Trinity Evangelical Divinity School in 'The Difficult Doctrine of Love, says both the love of God and the wrath of God are ratcheted up in the New Testament over the Old. Also the concluding verses of several epistles emphasis love (1 Corinthians 16:22, Ephesians 6:24, 2 Thess 3:5).

Many of the most stunning promises in the Bible are for those who love God, notably Romans 8:28 (all things working for good for those who love God) and Deuteronomy 7:9 part of the prelude to the 10 commandments (those loving God being blessed to a thousands generations, where many of the worst curses in the Old Testament where curses went to 4 or 10 generations). Jonathan Edwards said his chief obligation was to raise the affections of his congregation as high as he could toward God in volume 4 of the Yale edition of his works, entitled “The Great Awakening.”

Both the terms love of God and love of Christ appear in the New Testament. In cases such as in Romans 8:35 and Romans 8:39 their use is related in the experience of the believer, without asserting their equality. In John 14:31 Jesus expresses his love for God the Father. This verse includes the only direct statement by Jesus in the New Testament about Jesus' love for God the Father.

== Greek polytheism ==
In polytheism, that which is loved by the gods (τὸ θεοφιλές) was identified as the virtuous or pious. Socrates famously asked whether this identification is a tautology (see Euthyphro dilemma).

=== "Philotheos" and "theophilos" ===
In Greek, philotheos means "loving God, pious", as philosophos means a lover of wisdom (sophia). 2 Timothy 3:4, using the word philotheos in the plural form, speaks of certain people as φιλήδονοι μᾶλλον ἢ φιλόθεοι (lovers of pleasure rather than lovers of God). The word Theophilos was and is used as a proper name, but does not appear as an adjective or common noun in Greek, which uses instead the form theophilês, which means "dear to God" but also "loving God".

However, Eric Voegelin used theophilos to mean "lover of God": "In the Phaedrus, Plato has Socrates describe the characteristics of the true thinker. When Phaedrus asks what one should call such a man, Socrates, following Heraclitus, replies that the term sophos, one who knows, would be excessive: this attribute may be applied to God alone: but one might well call him philosophos, a lover of wisdom. Thus in the classic sense and reference of 'philosophy', actual knowledge is reserved to God; finite man can only be the lover of knowledge, not himself the one who possesses knowledge. In the meaning of the passage, the lover of the knowledge that belongs only to the knowing God, the philosophos, becomes the theophilos, the lover of God."

== Hinduism ==
Bhakti is a Sanskrit term meaning "loving devotion to the supreme God". A person who practices bhakti is called a bhakta. Hindu writers, theologians, and philosophers have distinguished nine forms of bhakti, which can be found in the Bhagavata Purana and works by Tulsidas. The philosophical work Narada Bhakti Sutras, written by an unknown author (presumed to be Narada), distinguishes eleven forms of love.

=== Bhakti movements ===
Devotees of Krishna worship him in different emotional, transcendental raptures, known as rasas. Two major systems of Krishna worship developed, each with its own philosophical system. These two systems are aishwaryamaya bhakti and madhuryamaya bhakti. Aishwaryamaya bhakti is revealed in the abode of queens and kingdom of Krishna in Dwaraka. Madhuryamaya Bhakti is revealed in the abode of Braja. Thus Krishna is variously worshipped according to the development of devotee's taste in worshipping the Supreme Personality of Godhead, Sri Krishna, as father, friend, master, beloved and many different varieties which are all extraordinary. Krishna is famous as Makhanchor, or butter thief. He loved to eat butter and is the beloved of his little village in Gokul. These are all transcendental descriptions. Thus they are revealed to the sincere devotees in proportion to the development in their love of Godhead. Vaishnavism is a form of monotheism, sometimes described as 'polymorphic monotheism', with implication that there are many forms of one original deity, defined as belief in a single unitary deity who takes many forms. In Krishnaism this deity is Krishna, sometimes referred as intimate deity – as compared with the numerous four-armed forms of Narayana or Vishnu. It may refer to either of the interrelated concepts of the love of God towards creation, the love of creatures towards God or relationship between the two as in bhakti.

== Islam ==
The love of God, and the fear of God, are two of the foundations of Islam. The highest spiritual attainment in Islam is related to the love of God. "Yet there are men who take (for worship) others besides God, as equal (with God): They love them as they should love God. But those of Faith are overflowing in their love for God." (Quran 2:165). Another Islamic concept is that God's love leads towards good deeds "And feed with food the needy, the orphan and the prisoner, for love of Him (i.e. God)."

Islam, as Christianity, has numerous mystics and traditions about the love of God, as in:

"O lovers! The religion of the love of God is not found in Islam alone.
In the realm of love, there is neither belief, nor unbelief." (Rumi)

The concept of Divine Love, known as Ishq-e-Haqeeqi (Persian), is elaborated by many great Muslim saints to date. Some Sufi writers and poets may have taken human love as a metaphor to define Divine Love but the prominent mystics explain the concept in its entirety and reveal its hardcore reality. Rabia Basri, the famous 7th century mystic, is known as the first female to have set the doctrine of Divine Love. In Islamic Sufism, Ishq means to love God selflessly and unconditionally. For Rumi, 'Sufism' itself is Ishq and not the path of asceticism (zuhd). According to Sultan Bahoo, Ishq means to serve God by devoting one's entire life to Him and asking no reward in return.

== Judaism ==
The love of God has been called the "essence of Judaism". "And you shall love the Lord your God with all your heart and with all your soul and with all your might." (Deut 6:5)

== Other ==
Goethe expresses the sentiment of love of God alongside the opposite sentiment of hatred of God in his two poems Ganymed and Prometheus, respectively.

== See also ==
- Agape
- Altruism
- Bhakti
- Chesed
- Christian mysticism
- Christian universalism
- Divine filiation
- Fear of God (religion)
- Ignatian spirituality
- Love (religious views)
- Mercy
- Mystical theology
- Misotheism
- Omnibenevolence
- Problem of Hell
- The Seven Valleys
- Unconditional love
- Unio Mystica
