= Bernard Schweizer =

American academic

Bernard Schweizer (née Bernhard Schweizer, born, 1962) is a professor emeritus of English at Long Island University, Brooklyn. He has published several books and essay collections on topics in British and European literatures. He is a leading Rebecca West scholar and has edited or co-edited a number of Rebecca West’s previously unpublished and uncollected works. In 2003, he founded the International Rebecca West Society in New York and was the second president of the Society. In 2013, Schweizer founded another scholarly organization, the International Society for Heresy Studies, and served as its vice-president.

Schweizer's scholarship focuses on heterodox, rebellious, and challenging ideas channeled through literary expression. His most influential book, an interdisciplinary work titled Hating God: The Untold Story of Misotheism is devoted to humanists who believe in God yet deny that he is benevolent. And his book, Christianity and the Triumph of Humor: From Dante to David Javerbaum traces the development of Christian religious comedy through the ages to show that humor was able to conquer all conceivable Christian taboos while delivering significant artistic and intellectual benefits. Using history, literary criticism, theology, philosophy, and social science, Schweizer demonstrates that what begun with grotesque scenes in Dante's hell ended with unfettered comical irreverence in the work of David Javerbaum.

In January 2023, Schweizer founded Heresy Press LLC, a publishing house whose aim it is to serve as a bridge between authors writing fearless prose and readers looking for products of unbounded imagination. The press sees itself as a counterweight to current trends in the publishing industry where sensitivity readers and own-voice requirements limit what themes and perspectives are acceptable. Heresy Press, which focuses on fiction by writers of every identity and background, has to date published one short story anthology titled Nothing Sacred: Outspoken Voices in Contemporary Fiction, and five novels. In July 2024, Heresy Press became an imprint of Skyhorse Publishing.

Schweizer is a naturalized American citizen, born in Switzerland. His education included elementary schooling at the Waldorf School in Biel, Switzerland, an apprenticeship in health care, autodidactic study for the federal Swiss baccalaureate, backpacking around the world, two years of college study at the University of Lausanne, a B.A. in English earned at the University of Minnesota (Twin Cities Campus), and a Ph.D. in English literature from Duke University in 1997. Schweizer held a teaching and research appointment at the University of Zurich from 1996 to 1999, he was a research fellow for the Swiss National Science Foundation from 2000 to 2002 and then joined the English Department faculty of Long Island University in 2002, being promoted there to full professor in 2012. After retiring early in 2019, Schweizer was named emeritus Professor.

== Works ==
Monographs:

- Christianity and the Triumph of Humor: From Dante to David Javerbaum (Routledge, 2019)
- Hating God: The Untold Story of Misotheism (Oxford University Press, 2010)
- Radicals on the Road: The Politics of English Travel Writing in the 1930s (University of Virginia Press, 2001)
- Rebecca West: Heroism, Rebellion, and the Female Epic (Greenwood, 2002)

Essay Collections:

- Muslims and Humour: Essays on Comedy, Joking, and Mirth in Contemporary Islamic Contexts co-edited with Lina Molokotos-Liederman (Bristol University Press, 2022)
- Reading Heresy: Religion and Dissent in Literature and Art (Critical Insights Series), co-edited with Gregory Erickson (DeGruyter, 2017)
- The Hero's Quest (Critical Insights Series), co-edited with Robert Segal (Salem Press, 2012)
- Not So Innocent Abroad: the Politics of Travel and Travel Writing co-edited with Ulrike Brisson (CSP, 2009)
- Approaches to the Anglo and American Female Epic (Ashgate, 2006)
- Rebecca West Today: Contemporary Critical Approaches (University of Delaware Press, 2007)

Editions of Rebecca West:

- The Return of the Soldier by Rebecca West, co-edited by Bernard Schweizer and Charles Thorne (Broadview Press, 2010)
- The Essential Rebecca West: Uncollected Prose by Rebecca West (Pearhouse Press, 2010)
- Survivors in Mexico by Rebecca West (Yale University Press, 2003)
- Woman as Artist and Thinker by Rebecca West (iUniverse, 2005)
