= Prometheus (Goethe) =

Poem by Johann Wolfgang von Goethe

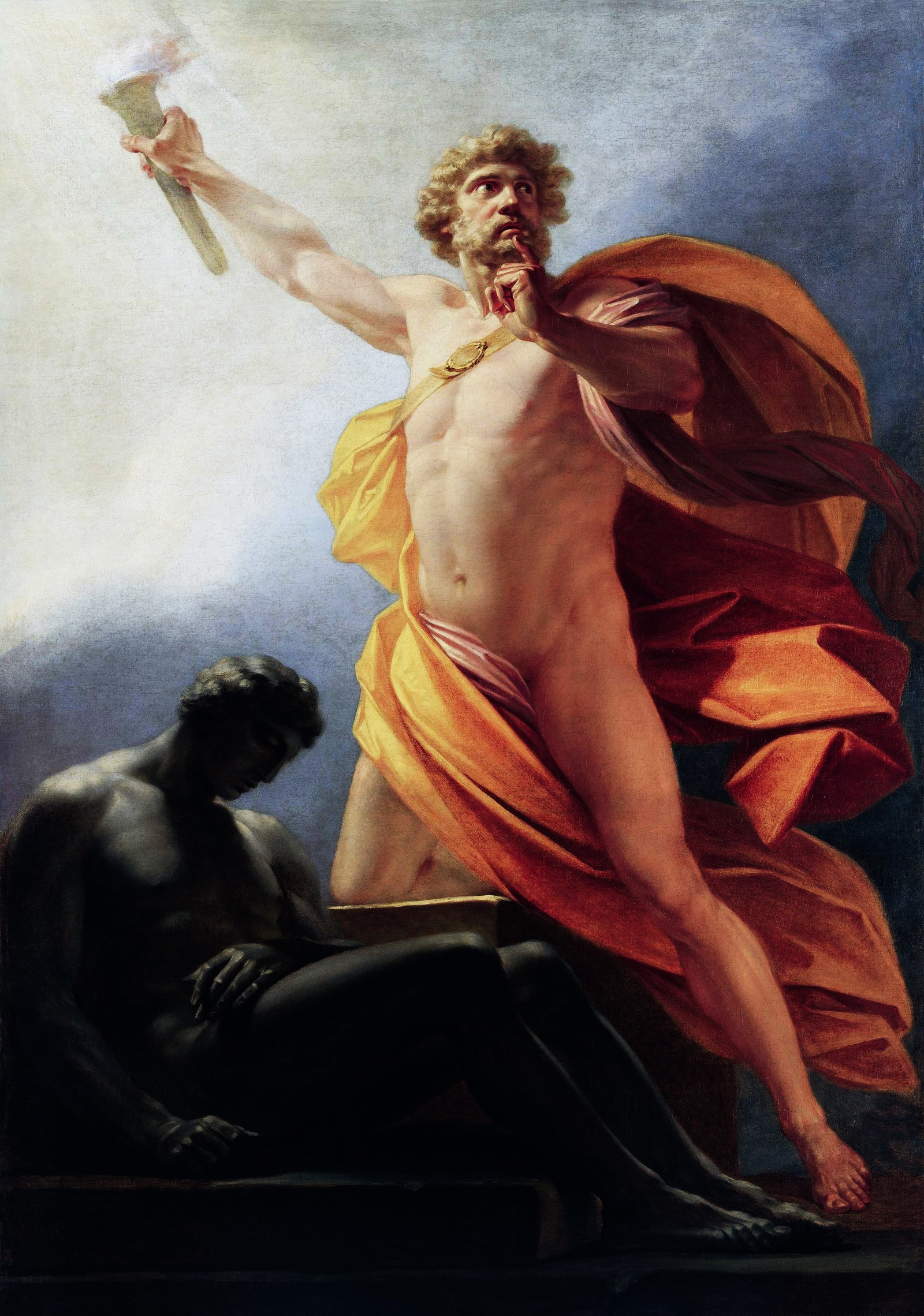
Prometheus Brings Fire to Mankind (c. 1817) by Heinrich Füger

"Prometheus" is a poem by Johann Wolfgang von Goethe, in which the character of the mythic Prometheus addresses God (as Zeus) in misotheist accusation and defiance. The poem was written between 1772 and 1774 and first published in 1789. Friedrich Heinrich Jacobi published an anonymous and unauthorised version in 1785. It is an important work of the German Sturm und Drang movement.

In early editions of the Collected Works of Goethe, it appeared in Volume II of his poems in a section of Vermischte Gedichte (assorted poems), shortly following the "Gesang der Geister über den Wassern", and the Harzreise im Winter. It is immediately followed by "Ganymed", and the two poems together should be understood as a pair. Both belong to the period 1770 to 1775.

Prometheus (1774) was planned as a drama but not completed; this poem draws upon that original vision. Prometheus is the creative and rebellious spirit which, rejected by God, angrily defies him and asserts itself; Ganymede is the boyish self that is adored and seduced by God. One is the lone defiant, the other the yielding acolyte. As the humanist poet, Goethe presents both identities as aspects or forms of the human condition.

Although the setting is classical, the address to the Biblical God is suggested by the section beginning "Da ich ein Kind war..." ("When I was a child"): the use of Da is distinctive, and by it Goethe evokes the Lutheran translation of Saint Paul's First Epistle to the Corinthians, 13:11: "Da ich ein Kind war, da redete ich wie ein Kind..." ("When I was a child, I spoke as a child, I understood as a child, I thought as a child: but when I became a man, I put away childish things"). Unlike Paul, Goethe's Prometheus grew up to reject belief in the divine heart moved to pity for the afflicted. Prometheus's reference to making man in his image draws strongly on Luther's translation of the words of God in Genesis 1:26 ("Laßt uns Menschen machen, ein Bild, das uns gleich sei").

The poem was set to music by J. F. Reichardt, Franz Schubert (see "Prometheus", 1819); Hugo Wolf (1889), and F.M. Einheit (1993).

== Text ==
Bedecke deinen Himmel, Zeus,
Mit Wolkendunst,
Und übe, dem Knaben gleich,
Der Disteln köpft,
An Eichen dich und Bergeshöhn;
Musst mir meine Erde
Doch lassen stehn
Und meine Hütte, die du nicht gebaut,
Und meinen Herd,
Um dessen Glut
Du mich beneidest.

Ich kenne nichts Ärmeres
Unter der Sonn' als euch, Götter!
Ihr nähret kümmerlich
Von Opfersteuern
Und Gebetshauch
Eure Majestät,
Und darbtet, wären
Nicht Kinder und Bettler
Hoffnungsvolle Toren.

Da ich ein Kind war,
Nicht wusste wo aus noch ein,
Kehrt' ich mein verirrtes Auge
Zur Sonne, als wenn drüber wär'
Ein Ohr, zu hören meine Klage,
Ein Herz, wie mein's,
Sich des Bedrängten zu erbarmen.

Wer half mir
Wider der Titanen Übermut?
Wer rettete vom Tode mich,
Von Sklaverei?
Hast du nicht alles selbst vollendet,
Heilig glühend Herz?
Und glühtest jung und gut,
Betrogen, Rettungsdank
Dem Schlafenden da droben?

Ich dich ehren? Wofür?
Hast du die Schmerzen gelindert
Je des Beladenen?
Hast du die Tränen gestillet
Je des Geängsteten?
Hat nicht mich zum Manne geschmiedet
Die allmächtige Zeit
Und das ewige Schicksal,
Meine Herrn und deine?

Wähntest du etwa,
Ich sollte das Leben hassen,
In Wüsten fliehen,
Weil nicht alle
Blütenträume reiften?

Hier sitz' ich, forme Menschen
Nach meinem Bilde,
Ein Geschlecht, das mir gleich sei,
Zu leiden, zu weinen,
Zu genießen und zu freuen sich,
Und dein nicht zu achten,
Wie ich!

Cover thy spacious heavens, Zeus,
With clouds of mist,
And like the boy who lops
The thistles' heads,
Disport with oaks and mountain-peaks;
Yet thou must leave
My earth still standing;
My cottage, too, which was not raised by thee;
Leave me my hearth,
Whose kindly glow
By thee is envied.

I know nought poorer
Under the sun, than ye gods!
Ye nourish painfully,
With sacrifices
And votive prayers,
Your majesty;
Ye would e'en starve,
If children and beggars
Were not trusting fools.

While yet a child,
And ignorant of life,
I turned my wandering gaze
Up toward the sun, as if with him
There were an ear to hear my wailings,
A heart, like mine,
To feel compassion for distress.

Who helped me
Against the Titans' insolence?
Who rescued me from certain death,
From slavery?
Didst thou not do all this thyself,
My sacred glowing heart?
And glowedst, young and good,
Deceived with grateful thanks
To yonder slumbering one?

I honour thee, and why?
Hast thou e'er lightened the sorrows
Of the heavy laden?
Hast thou e'er dried up the tears
Of the anguish-stricken?
Was I not fashioned to be a man
By omnipotent Time,
And by eternal Fate,
Masters of me and thee?

Didst thou e'er fancy
That life I should learn to hate,
And fly to deserts,
Because not all
My blossoming dreams grew ripe?

Here sit I, forming mortals
After my image;
A race resembling me,
To suffer, to weep,
To enjoy, to be glad,
And thee to scorn,
As I!

"Prometheus"
spoken (in German)
(2:06 minutes, 1 MB)

== Sources ==
- J. W. Goethe, Goethes Werke: Vollständige Ausgabe letzter Hand (Vol. II, pp. 76–78). (J. G. Cotta'sche Buchhandlung, Stuttgart and Tübingen 1827).
- J. W. Goethe, Gedichte (Aufbau-Verlag, Berlin and Tübingen 1988)
- J. W. Goethe, Werke Hamburger Ausgabe in 14 Bänden (Vol. 1 Gedichte und Epen I, pp. 44–46). München, 1998.
- Martin Luther, Die Bibel, oder die ganze Heilige Schrift des Alten und Neuen Testaments.
