= Alto Rhapsody =

1869 rhapsody for alto, male chorus, and orchestra by Johannes Brahms

- Choral composition by Johannes Brahms
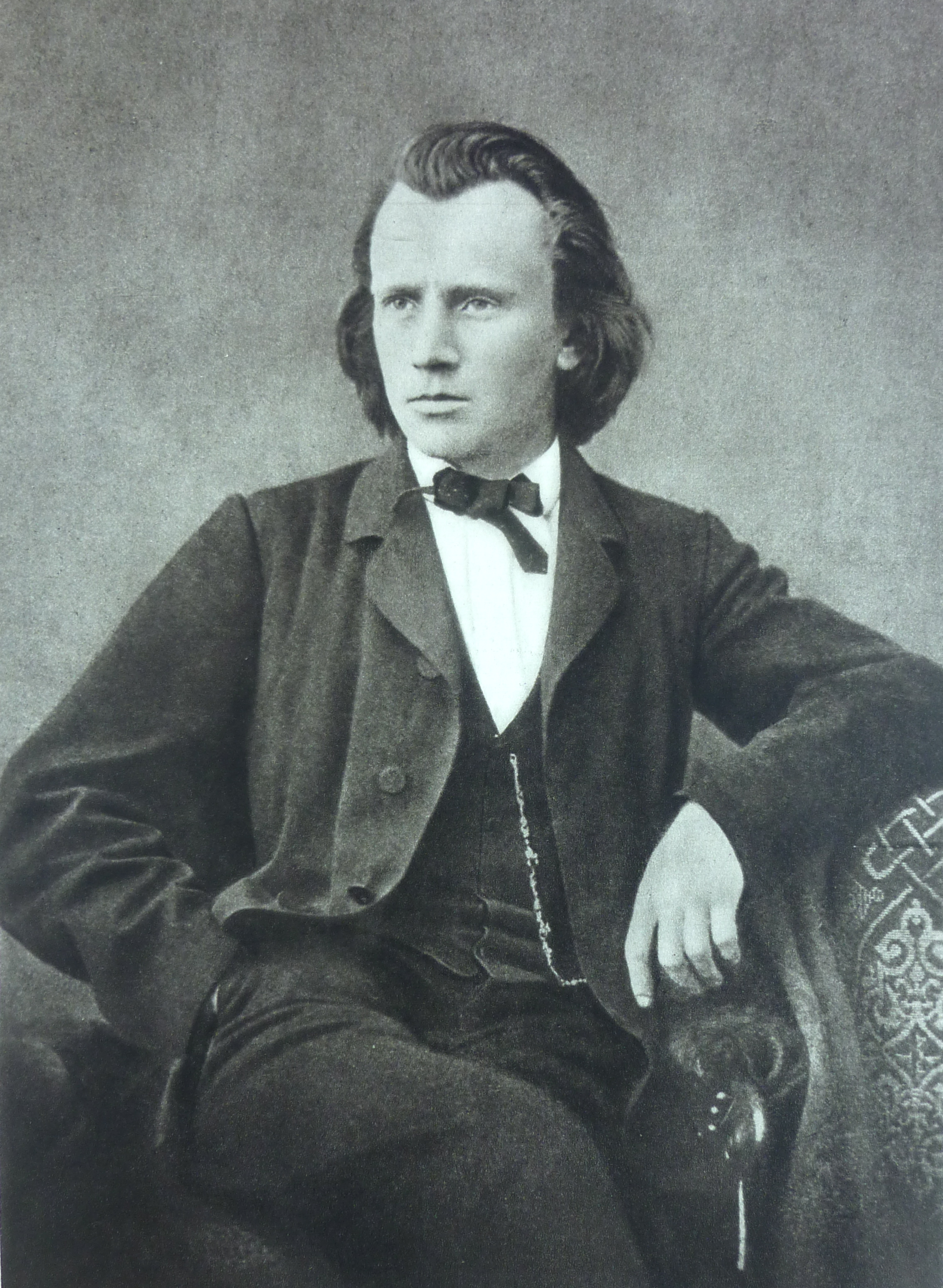
- The composer c. 1866
- Full title: Rhapsodie für eine Altstimme, Männerchor und Orchester
- Opus: 53
- Occasion: Wedding of Julie Schumann
- Text: from Goethe's Harzreise im Winter
- Language: German
- Composed: 1869
- Duration: 12 minutes
- Scoring: alto; male chorus; orchestra

The Alto Rhapsody, Op. 53, is a composition for an alto voice, male chorus, and orchestra by Johannes Brahms, a setting of verses from Johann Wolfgang von Goethe's Harzreise im Winter. It was written in 1869, as a wedding gift for Robert and Clara Schumann's daughter, Julie. Brahms scholars have long speculated that the composer may have had romantic feelings for Julie, which he may have integrated into the text and music of the Alto Rhapsody. The text, with its metaphysical portrayal of a misanthropic soul who is urged to find spiritual sustenance and throw off the shackles of his suffering, has powerful parallels in Brahms's life and character.

The work is in three sections: the first two, in a chromatically dense and wandering C minor, are for the soloist and orchestra and describe the pain of the misanthropic wanderer. The second section is an aria in all but name. The third section, in a nominal C major, brings in the male chorus, which joins the soloist in a plea to a celestial spirit for an abatement of the wanderer's pain. The third part of the Rhapsody has similarities of vocal and choral style to A German Requiem, which was written the previous year.

The work typically takes between twelve and fifteen minutes in performance. See recordings, below, for indicative timings.

The work was first "tried out" on 6 October 1869, at the dress rehearsal for the Karlsruhe season's first orchestral subscription concert. Amalia Boni sang the solo part; the conductor Hermann Levi was on hand, but there was no male voice chorus, and it is unclear whether Boni was accompanied by orchestra or simply on piano. Brahms and Clara Schumann were present, but there was certainly no other audience. It received its first public performance, and its first definitely known proper performance, on 3 March 1870, at Jena. The soloist at the first performance was Pauline Viardot and the conductor was Ernst Naumann.

The text Brahms set is:

Aber abseits, wer ist's?
Ins Gebüsch verliert sich sein Pfad,
hinter ihm schlagen die Sträuche zusammen,
das Gras steht wieder auf,
die Öde verschlingt ihn.

Ach, wer heilet die Schmerzen
des, dem Balsam zu Gift ward?
Der sich Menschenhaß
aus der Fülle der Liebe trank?
Erst verachtet, nun ein Verächter,
zehrt er heimlich auf
seinen eignen Wert
In ung'nügender Selbstsucht.

Ist auf deinem Psalter,
Vater der Liebe, ein Ton
seinem Ohre vernehmlich,
so erquicke sein Herz!
Öffne den umwölkten Blick
über die tausend Quellen
neben dem Durstenden
in der Wüste!

But who is that apart?
His path disappears in the bushes;
behind him the branches spring together;
the grass stands up again;
the wasteland engulfs him.

Ah, who heals the pains
of him for whom balsam turned to poison?
Who drank hatred of man
from the abundance of love?
First scorned, now a scorner,
he secretly feeds on
his own merit,
in unsatisfying egotism.

If there is on your psaltery,
Father of love, one note
his ear can hear,
then refresh his heart!
Open his clouded gaze
to the thousand springs
next to him who thirsts
in the wilderness!

== Recordings ==
The Alto Rhapsody is not frequently performed in concert, perhaps because of the expense of hiring a soloist and chorus for a short piece, but it has been recorded many times both by contralto and mezzo-soprano singers. A selection of recordings available as of 2012 illustrates the wide range of tempi adopted by different interpreters of the Rhapsody, with playing duration ranging from 11 minutes 15 seconds to 16 minutes 10 seconds.

Soloist	Date	Choir	Orchestra	Conductor	Duration
Marian Anderson	8 Jan. 1939	Pennsylvania Choral Society	Philadelphia Orchestra	Eugene Ormandy	13:10
Marian Anderson	3 Mar. 1945	San Francisco Chorus	San Francisco Orchestra	Pierre Monteux	12:47
Marian Anderson	10 Dec. 1950	Male Chorus of the Schola Cantorum	New York Philharmonic Symphony Orchestra	Fritz Busch	12:42
Marian Anderson	10 Dec. 1950	Male Voices of the Robert Shaw Chorale	RCA Victor Symphony Orchestra	Fritz Reiner	14:37
Dame Janet Baker	1968	BBC's Men's Chorus	BBC Symphony Orchestra	Sir Adrian Boult	13:51
Dame Janet Baker	1988	London Symphony Chorus	City of London Sinfonia	Richard Hickox	13:45
Dame Janet Baker	1970	John Alldis Choir	London Philharmonic Orchestra	Sir Adrian Boult	11:45
Oralia Dominguez	12 Nov. 1954	Männerchor des Wiener Singvereins	Vienna Symphony	Paul Kletzki	14:56
Stephanie Blythe	?	Ensemble a sei voci	Ensemble Orchestral de Paris	John Nelson	12:14
Brigitte Fassbaender	1982	Prague Philharmonic Chorus	Czech Philharmonic	Giuseppe Sinopoli	14:28
Kathleen Ferrier	Dec 1947	Male choir	London Philharmonic Orchestra	Clemens Krauss	15:53
Kathleen Ferrier	14 Oct 1949	Oslo Philharmonic Chorus	Oslo Philharmonic	Erik Tuxen	13:10
Ann Hallenberg	2011	Collegium Vocale Gent	Orchestre des Champs-Élysées	Philippe Herreweghe	11:15
Aafje Heynis	Feb 1958	Royal Male Choir, "Apollo"	Royal Concertgebouw Orchestra	Eduard van Beinum	12:43
Marilyn Horne	1988	Atlanta Symphony Orchestra Chorus	Atlanta Symphony Orchestra	Robert Shaw	14:01
Maiju Kuusoja	1961	Male chorus	Finnish Radio Symphony Orchestra	Paavo Berglund	14:49
Marjana Lipovšek	Sep 1988	Ernst-Senff-Chor	Berlin Philharmonic	Claudio Abbado	13:04
Christa Ludwig	1962	Philharmonia Chorus	Philharmonia Orchestra	Otto Klemperer	12:27
Christa Ludwig	1976	Wiener Singverein	Vienna Philharmonic	Karl Böhm	16:10
Mildred Miller	11 Jan 1961	Occidental College Chorus	Columbia Symphony Orchestra	Bruno Walter	12:25
Jessye Norman	1989	Choral Arts Society of Philadelphia	Philadelphia Orchestra	Riccardo Muti	12: 28
Dunja Vejzović	1994	Houston Symphony Orchestra Chorus	Houston Symphony	Christoph Eschenbach	13:55
Anne Sofie von Otter	1995	Arnold Schoenberg Choir	Vienna Philharmonic	James Levine	12: 38
Nathalie Stutzmann	Nov 2007	Monteverdi Choir	Orchestre Révolutionnaire et Romantique	John Eliot Gardiner	12:57
