= Wilhelm Joseph von Wasielewski =

German musician (1822–1896)

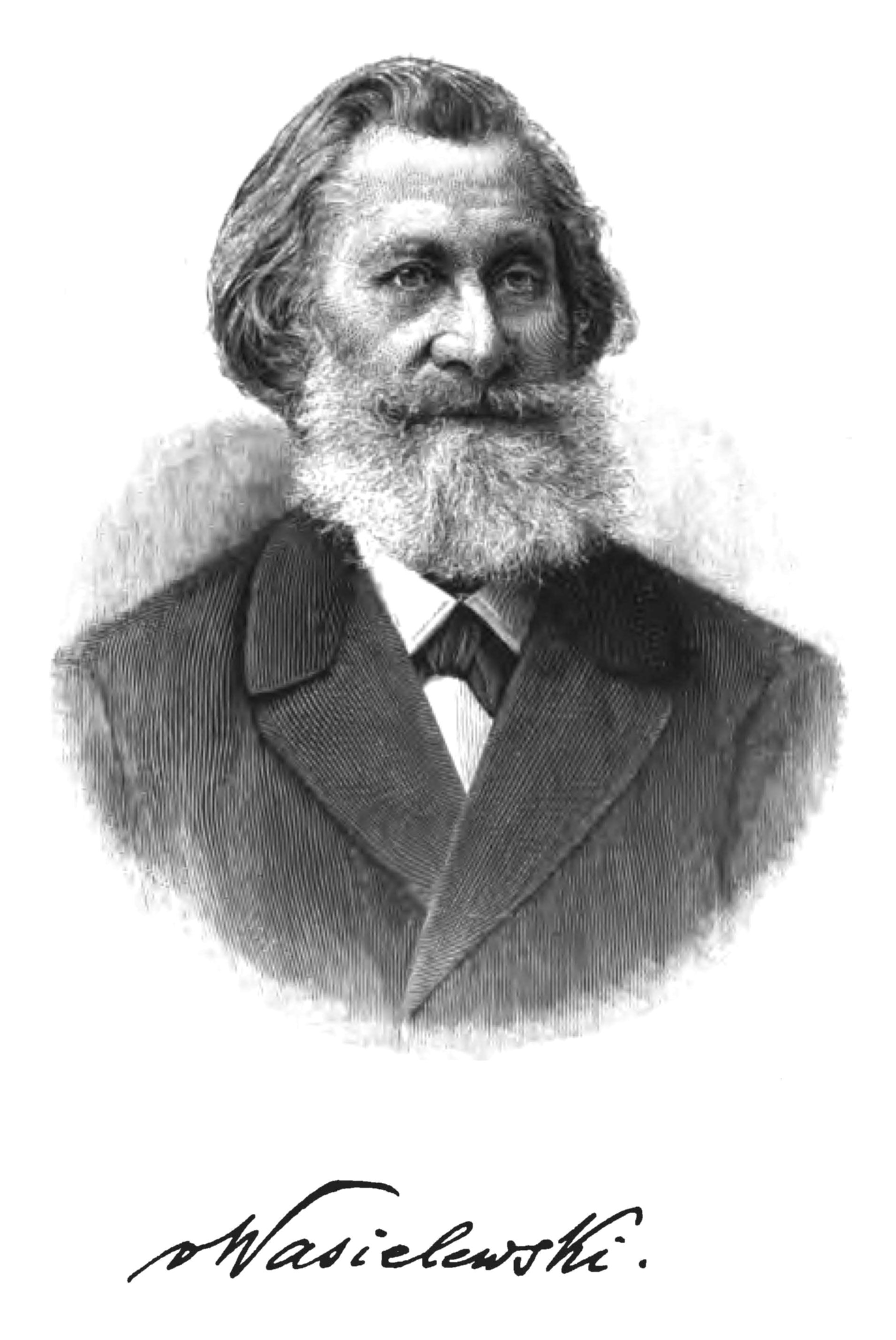
Wilhelm Joseph von Wasielewski.

Wilhelm Joseph von Wasielewski (17 June 1822 – 13 December 1896) was a German violinist, conductor, and musicologist.

== Life ==
Wasielewski was born on 17 June 1822 in the village of Groß-Leesen (Polish: Leźno), near Danzig as the eighth of eleven children of Henriette Christina Piwko (1788–1850) and Josef Thaddäus von Wasielewski (1785–1850), a landholder and later Rector of the Danzig convent school of St. Brigitta. His father gave him his first lessons in playing the violin, which soon became his favorite instrument. At age 10, he began studies at Danzig's St. Peter and Paul Academy.

On 2 April 1842, Wasielewski was accepted into the newly founded Leipzig Conservatory of Music, directed by Felix Mendelssohn. In addition to Mendelssohn, he studied with such renowned teachers as Robert Schumann, Moritz Hauptmann, and Ferdinand David. He joined the Leipzig Gewandhaus Orchestra in 1846 as a violinist. As a successful student, he had many avenues of opportunity, as a letter by Mendelssohn, written to Wasielewski's father on 17 September 1849, attests:

Your son has excelled from the start to gain favor amongst the pupils in the institution through an excellent manner, through hard work and persistence, and through unremitting zeal. His efficient and robust temper is free from dry or affected coercion, and his musical talent and genuine love of art leads him away from wild freedom and disorder. You have given him a proper upbringing, which would have still have been insufficient without such natural traits. From no direction has there been spoken even the slightest complaint or criticism about your son. On the contrary, his progress has been so remarkable that, for example, on the violin, the concertmaster David recently remarked to me that your sone is already such a good and capable musician that, should he remain in good health, nothing could stop him in any place from gaining recognition for his own achievements and contributions to art for its own honor.

Robert Schumann called Wasielewski as concertmaster of the Düsseldorf Musikverein in 1850. He soon developed strong relations with the Schumanns, finding close expression though playing chamber music with them in public and private.

Wasielewski found employment as a choral director in Bonn in 1852. At that time he also founded a successful piano trio with Julius Tausch and Christian Reimers. Later, he was offered leadership of the male-voice choir the Concordia Liedertafel and the orchestra of the Beethoven Society.

Correspondence with the Schumanns until Robert's death in 1856 witnesses the intense friendly relations with the families. Schumann dedicated his Märchenbilder, Op. 113 to Wilhelm Josef and his Albumblätter, Op. 124 to Alma.

Unable to find a permanent position in Bonn, the family decided to move to Dresden in 1855 where they lived for fourteen years. Wilhelm Josef spent his time performing as a soloist with the orchestras in Dresden and Leipzig, gave music lessons, and continued his literary work. These years also saw the development of a personal relationship with the piano virtuoso and composer Franz Liszt, who invited Wilhelm Joseph to the Altenberg in Weimar.

Wasielewski published the first biography of Schumann in 1858, which found wide recognitions and went through many editions both in Germany and abroad.

The Royal library in Dresden hosted an extensive collection of old musical manuscripts and documents, leading Wasielewski to the idea of writing a treatise on the historical development of the violin and violin playing in the various styles of different European countries. This led to the publication of the landmark work, Die Violine und ihre Meister [The violin and its players] in 1868, going through nine editions, the last, as with other works by Wasielewski, revised by his son, Waldemar von Wasielewski.

Wasielewski finally received an appointment as municipal music director in Bonn in 1869. His first wife, Alma, died in 1871, who was buried alongside their two sons in the old cemetery. He was appointed Royal music director in 1873.

He developed good relations with composers Johannes Brahms and Max Bruch, as extensive correspondence shows. In 1874, Wasielewski, with another famous close friend, the violin virtuoso Joseph Joachim, assumed directorship of performances from Clara Schumann of a music festival to commemorate a monument erected at Robert Schumann's resting place. The monument, designed by Adolf Donndorf, was unveiled on 2 May 1880.

In 1878 he was awarded an honorary membership in the Accademia Filarmonica in Bologna.

At age 61, he retired to the palace town of Sondershausen, continuing his writings on music. His late publications include a biography of Beethoven and a history of the cello. He died on 13 December 1896 at age 74 in Sondershausen where he was buried. His memoirs were published in 1897.

== Works (selection) ==
In addition to his numerous musical and historical writings, Wasielewski also published several compositions, the most prominent being his Notturno for violin (or other instrument) and piano, Op. 21, Herbstblumen (Autumn Flowers), 9 Pieces for violin or viola and piano, Op. 30, and Sedan Lied (Sedan Song), which received brief attention from Chancellor Otto von Bismarck.

- Robert Schumann, Dresden (1858)
- Die Violine und ihre Meister, Leipzig (1869)
- Die Violine im 17. Jahrhundert und die Anfänge der Instrumentalkomposition, Bonn (1874)
- Geschichte der Instrumentalmusik im XVI. Jahrhundert, Berlin (1878)
- Goethes Verhältnis zur Musik, Leipzig (1880)
- Schumanniana, Bonn (1883)
- Ludwig van Beethoven, Berlin (1888)
- Das Violoncell und seine Geschichte, Leipzig (1889)
- Carl Reinecke, Leipzig (1892)
- Aus siebzig Jahren - Lebenserinnerungen, Leipzig (1897)
