= Harzreise im Winter =

Poem by Johann Wolfgang von Goethe

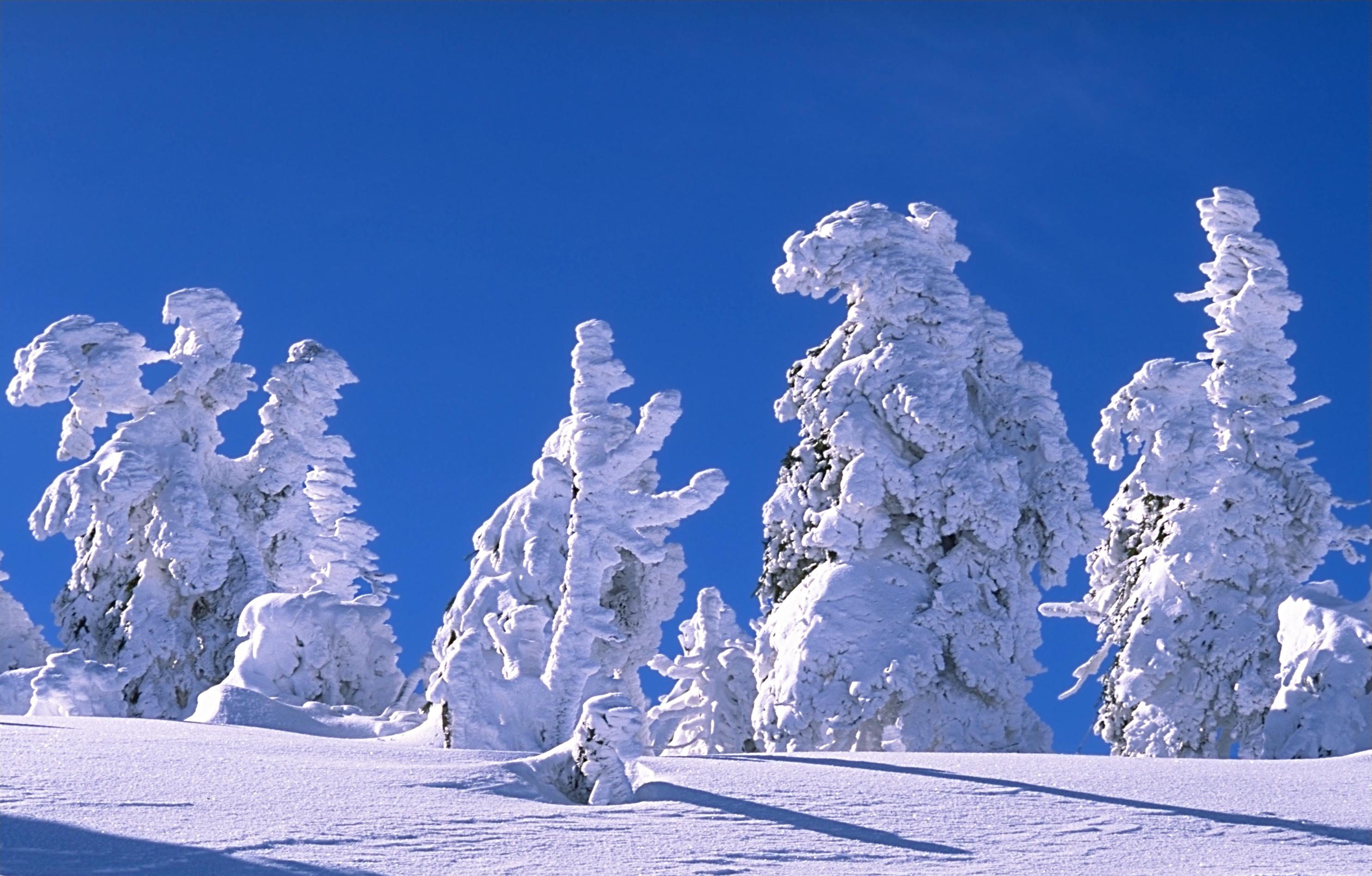
Trees in the Harz mountains after heavy snow

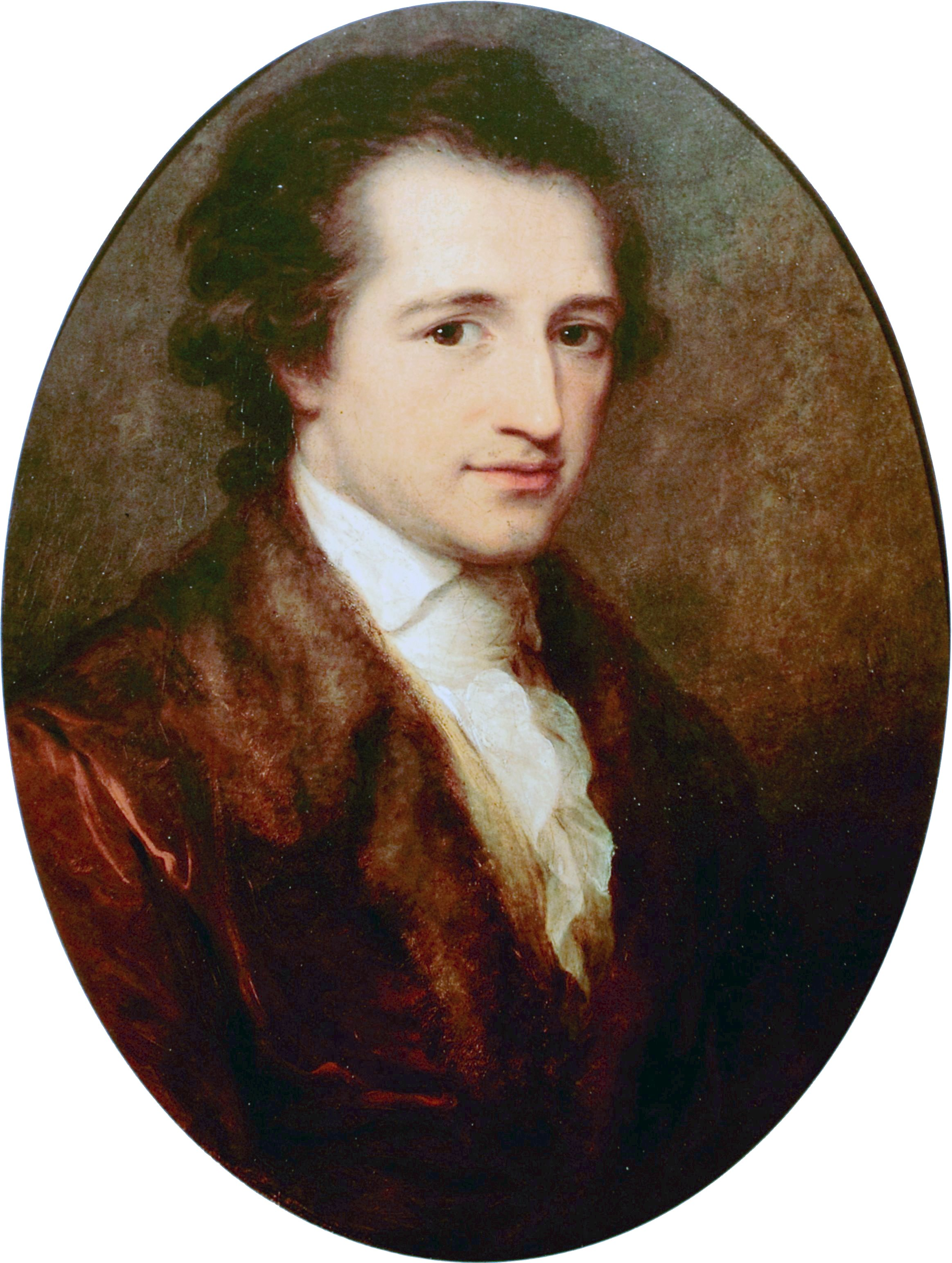
Portrait of Goethe by Angelica Kaufman in 1787

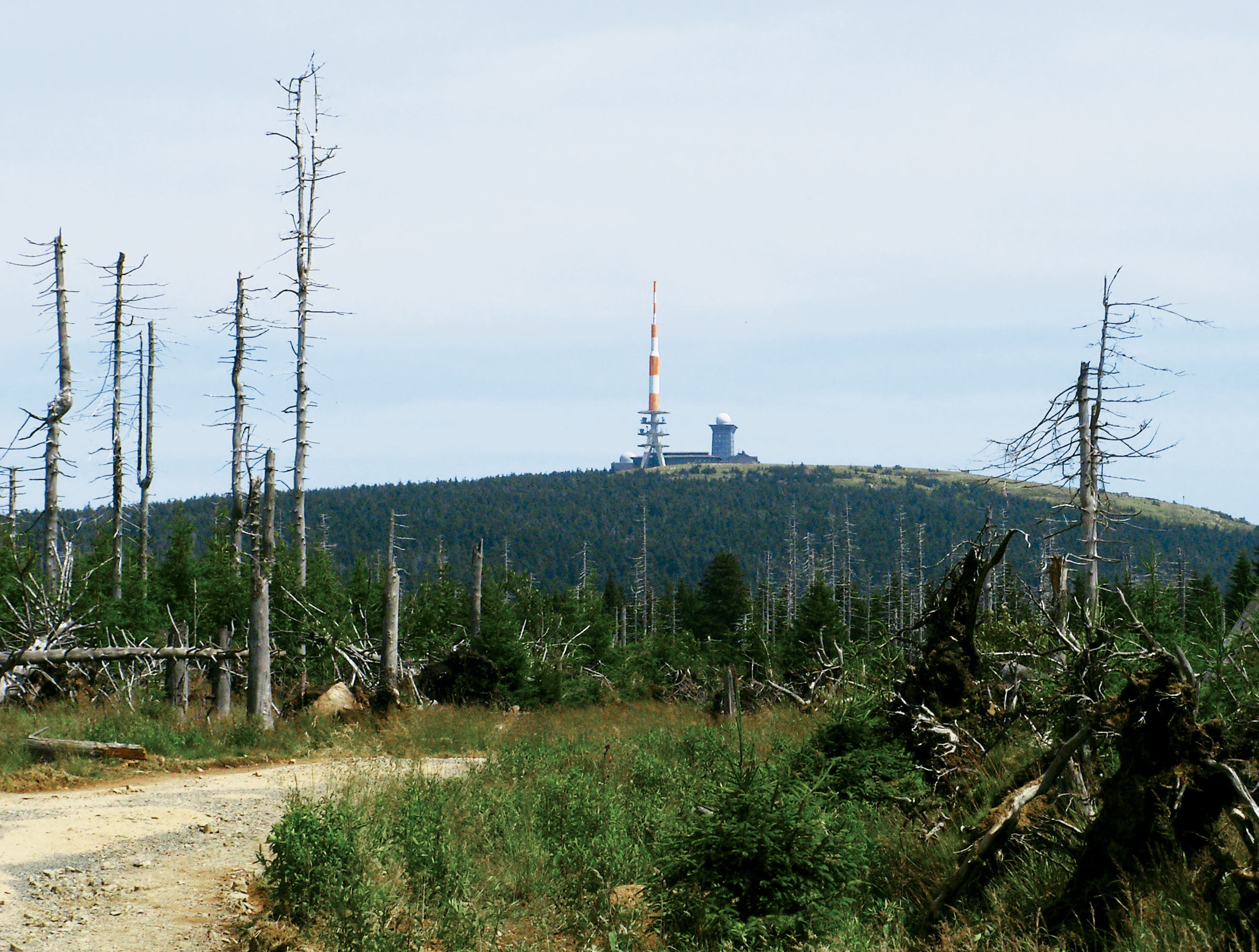
View of the Goetheweg on the Brocken

"Harzreise im Winter" (Winter Journey in the Harz) is a poem by Johann Wolfgang von Goethe, inspired by his ascent of the Brocken in the Harz mountains during the winter of 1777. He reached the summit in the heat of midday, in deep snow, with the landscape below him shrouded in clouds. The Brocken had always been a place of mystery, connected with witches and devils; where illusions such as the Brocken spectre might confuse an unwary traveller, and where few ventured by choice. This was the inspiration and the setting for his poem.

"Harzreise im Winter" was the last of Goethe's works in his Sturm und Drang period, marking the end of a series of long, free-verse poems hymns by the young poet that had begun with "Wandrers Sturmlied", and it is less self-absorbed than his earlier writing. It was first published in 1789 in the eighth volume of his works.

== Creation and publication ==
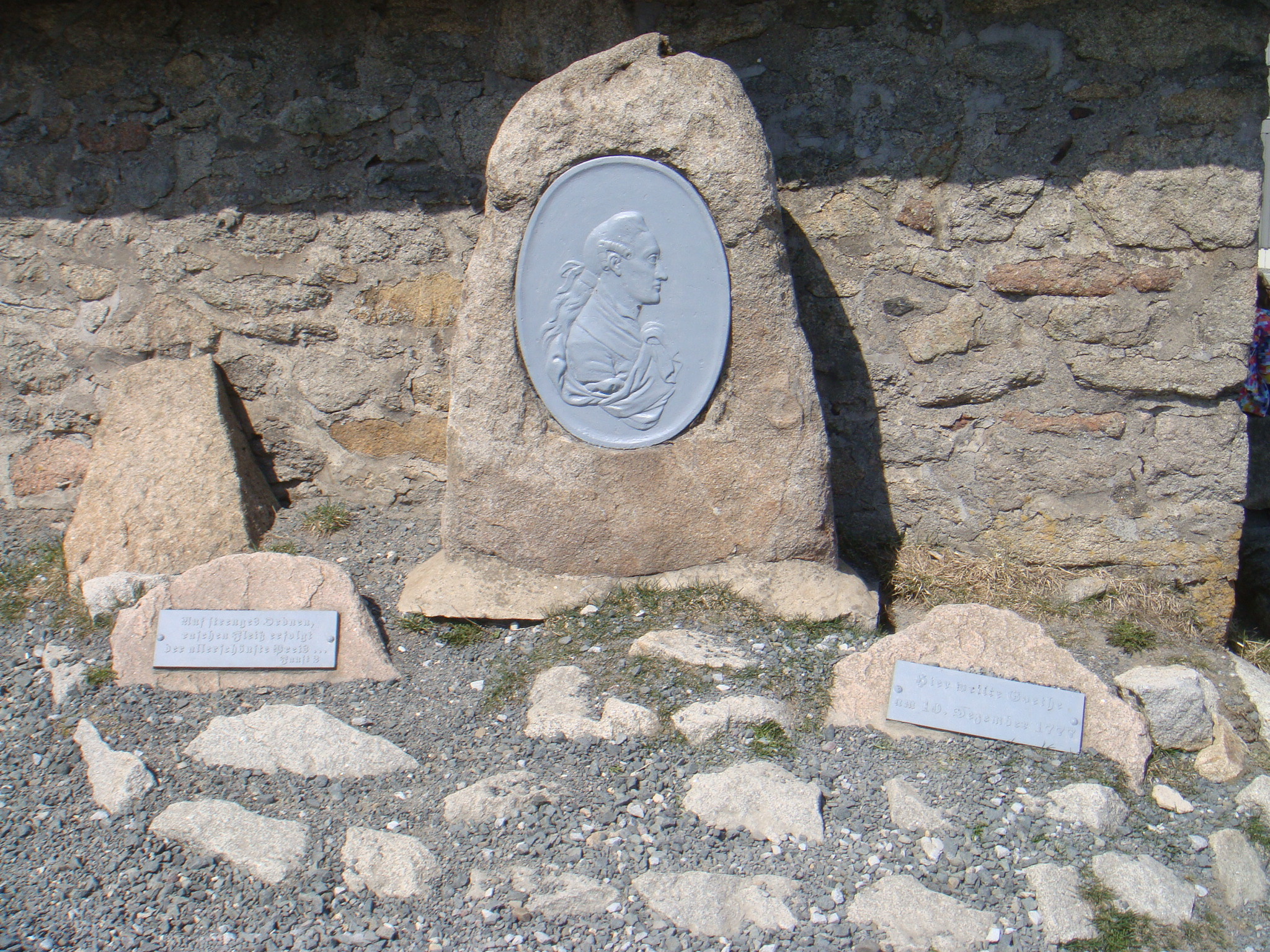
Commemorative plaque for Goethe on the Brocken

Goethe wrote the poem during his first trip to the Harz when he spent two weeks on his own, with only local guides to accompany him, from 29 November to 14 December 1777. During this trip he signed himself in hotel guest books as "Johann Wilhelm Weber from Darmstadt". On 16 November he had referred in his diary to a "Project on the Secret Journey", an undertaking that he described on 7 December in a letter to Charlotte von Stein as a "pilgrimage". On the first of December, several days before the ascent of the Brocken, he had already conceived of the opening words of the poem, "Like the vulture". The 'pilgrimage' up the Brocken was intended to be the highlight of his trip, but as well as being considered dangerous, the weather conditions made it uncertain, and he was not able to make the ascent until 10 December. Many years later, in his autobiographical essay Campaign in France, he declared that he had seen a vulture "in the gloomy snow-capped clouds that rose from the north" on the Ettersberg, and that he had already begun the poem that day.

The original manuscript of the poem has not survived, so the earliest known version is a transcription by Philipp Seidel, attached to a letter to Johann Heinrich Merck dated 5 August 1778. Goethe did not include the work in his handwritten collection of texts which he put together in 1777 for Charlotte von Stein. He edited his early version for the eight volume of his writings in 1789, making some minor changes in the final stanza.

== Form and themes ==
The work consists of 88 lines of free verse, divided into eleven stanzas of differing lengths. This was a common ode arrangement in the 18th century. It contains two key elements that were to become central to the discourse of the Romantics on winter travel – references to frosty, lifeless landscapes, and their intimate connection with the loneliness of the hero who had withdrawn into the wilderness in the face of some kind of crisis.

The poem opens with a stanza in which the poet likens his song to a hovering bird of prey looking down on the earth: The second to fifth stanzas contrast the fate of the lucky and those who struggle against misfortune, illustrating the difference in their experiences in terms of the landscape. Next, the poet's vision passes from the external into the internal perspective, illuminating the distress of the selfish and asking who heals the pain of "the balm that became poison" and of one "who but hate for man / From the fullness of love hath drunk?"

In the following stanza, the song invokes the "Father of Love," who refreshes the heart of the sufferer and clears his "clouded gaze" so that a "thousand springs" are revealed to the "thirsty / in the desert". This plea is extended to the "Brothers of the Hunt" in the eighth stanza, so that they too may be blessed. The tenth stanza then asks for the lonely soul – the poet himself – to be wrapped in "golden clouds" and surrounded by "winter green". After a well-lit and sheltered ascent through "the fords of the night," the poet reaches the "dreaded summit" and gazes in gratitude toward the overawing spectacle of nature.

== Context ==
After his Harz journey, Goethe was ready to move on from the unrestrained forms of expression which characterised the Sturm und Drang. Later in life, he distanced himself from the sentiments of his earliest work, including The Sorrows of Young Werther, seeking measure and order instead. At the time "Harzreise im Winter" was written however, The Sorrows of Young Werther continued to exert a strong influence on many young men. One of these was Friedrich Victor Leberecht Plessing, the prototype for the unfortunate person referred to in the poem as consumed in bitterness. He had been greatly influenced by Goethe's work and after studying theology and jurisprudence had returned to his parents' house in Wernigerode, consumed with melancholy. Plessing had written to Goethe asking for advice in 1776, but Goethe had not replied to him. Goethe visited Plessing on his journey to the Harz on 3 December, but was unable to help him.

In his Campaign in France, Goethe later described Plessing's unanswered letter as "the most extraordinary thing he had ever seen in its self-tormenting manner." In addition to Plessing there were others who sought his help, and whom Goethe supported - he said that he had also "imposed" on other young men whom he wanted to help along their way. However, many of those who sought Goethe's help would not have gone along with him on his "path to a purer higher education," and would have held back his own self-development. Indeed, as much as Harzreise im Winter may allude to his encounter with Plessing, it is Goethe's own self-development that its main topic. He ascends the mountain to consult the oracle about his own fate, in other words to understand whether he is condemned to live the existence of the unfortunate, or whether he is to be redeemed by love.

Against the background of his diary entries and letters, this spiritual and redemptive element is shown in a clear light. After the eagerly awaited climb up the Brocken, he wrote: "cheerful, glorious moment, the whole world below in clouds and fog and above, everything cheerful" and added the sentence: "What is man that you are mindful of him?", a quotation from the eighth Psalm which he had written down on the anniversary of his arrival in Weimar.

== Language, imagery and critical appraisal ==
The poem is less descriptive than reflective, as the landscape mentioned in the title is only lightly sketched and exists mainly as the framework for an existential experience.

The poem opens with the image of a vulture flying high above the earth. Whether the bird he invokes was specifically a vulture or not is not entirely clear however – in Goethe's time the term "vulture" might encompass different birds of prey such as hawks or buzzards. The vulture was however a bird used in divination by the Romans, as Goethe knew. In this context, the vulture in the first stanza may link with the ideas of the second stanza – "For a God hath / Unto each prescribed / His destined path."

It is this sense of finding one's destined path that rings through the solemn words of the last two stanzas. In the sense of Sturm und Drang, and the urge to deify nature, an encounter with the divine itself takes place, and the successful ascent of the summit becomes a symbolic ascension onto a higher plane of being. The language which conveys this is reminiscent of Goethe's earlier poem Ganymed; ("Embrace the embracing! / Upwards to your bosom / loving Father!").

The critic Albrecht Schöne has linked the evocation of the vulture in the first stanza and its oracular significance with Goethe's governmental activity, about which he still had very mixed feelings at the time. In the opinion of Jochen Schmidt however, the bird of prey is associated with the eagle found in Pindar's work. For him, the first stanza refers specifically to the third Nemean Ode and proclaims Goethe's self-assurance and the complex relationship between poetry and lived experience.

The image of the "thirsty / in the desert" in the seventh stanza is associated with the book of Isaiah. While the phrases "mysterious-apparent" and "realms and majesty" of the last stanza define the religious quality of the lyric language, they are somewhat detached from their core exegetical meanings in the Epistle to the Romans and the Epistle to the Colossians as well as from the Temptation of Christ in the Gospel of Matthew.

Klaus Weimar (1984), Michael Mandelartz (2006) and Sebastian Kaufmann (2010/11) have all developed interpretations of the poem which differ to some degree from the traditional view, with its emphasis on the biographical details of Goethe's life, and suggest that the voice of the poet need not be essentially bound up with Goethe's own.

== Inspiration for later works ==
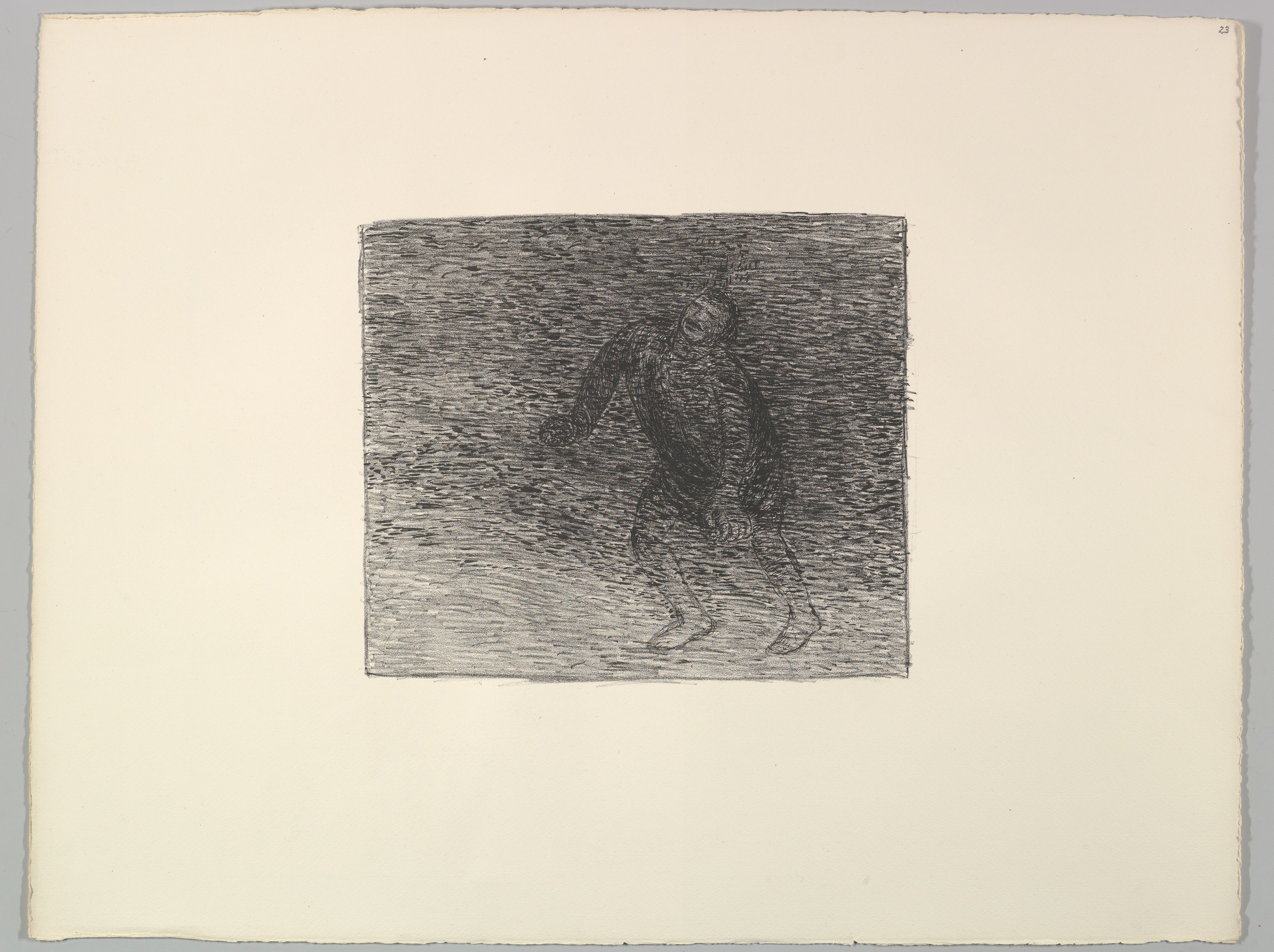
Crying Out in the Snow (Ruf im Nebel) by Ernst Barlach

In 1792, the composer Johann Friedrich Reichardt set some of the poem's words to music in his Rhapsodie (Aus der Harzreise). The chosen text was substantially the same as Brahms' later and more famous composition, the Alto Rhapsody, with Reichardt setting sixteen lines and Brahms twenty-two.

In 1924, Ernst Barlach produced a series of lithographs to illustrate "Harzreise im Winter".

== See also ==
- Goethe Way
- Die Harzreise, by Heinrich Heine

== Sources ==
- Conrady, Karl Otto [in German] (2006). "Harzreise im Winter". Goethe – Leben und Werk [Goethe, Life and Work] (in German). Düsseldorf: Patmos. ISBN 3-491-69136-2.
- Leistner, Bernd [in German] (1996). "Harzreise im Winter". In Bernd Witte [in German]; Regine Otto (eds.). Goethe-Handbuch. Vol. 1 Gedichte. Stuttgart: Metzler. ISBN 3-476-01443-6.
- Goethe, Johann Wolfgang von (1998). Gedichte und Epen I [Poems and Epics I]. Munich: C. H. Beck. ISBN 978-3-423-59038-9.
