= Misotheism =

Hatred of God or the gods

Misotheism is the "hatred of God" or "hatred of the gods" (from the Greek adjective misotheos (μισόθεος) "hating the gods" or "God-hating" – a compound of, μῖσος, "hatred" and, θεός, "god").

A related concept is dystheism (Ancient Greek: δύσ θεός, "bad god"), the belief that a god is not wholly good, but rather, is also capable of evil. In polytheistic belief systems, trickster gods often have a dystheistic nature. One example is Eshu, a trickster god from Yoruba religion who deliberately fostered violence between groups of people for his own deeds, saying that "causing ire is my greatest happiness." Many polytheistic deities since prehistory have been assumed to be neither good nor evil (or to have both qualities). Likewise, the concept of the demiurge in some versions of ancient Gnosticism is often portrayed as a generally evil entity. In conceptions of God as the summum bonum (the highest good), the proposition of God not being wholly good would be an oxymoron. Nevertheless, in monotheism, the sentiment may arise in the context of theodicy (the problem of evil, the Euthyphro dilemma) or as a rejection or criticism of particular depictions or attributions of the monotheistic god in certain belief systems (as expressed by Thomas Paine, a deist). A famous literary expression of misotheistic sentiment is Goethe's Prometheus, composed in the 1770s.

A historical proposition close to dystheism is the deus deceptor, "evil demon" (dieu trompeur) of René Descartes' Meditations on First Philosophy, which has been interpreted by Protestant critics as the blasphemous proposition that God exhibits malevolent intent. But Richard Kennington states that Descartes never declared his "evil genius" to be omnipotent, but merely no less powerful than he is deceitful, and thus not explicitly an equivalent to God, the singular omnipotent deity.

Thus, Hrafnkell, protagonist of the eponymous Hrafnkels saga set in the 10th century, as his temple to Freyr is burnt and he is enslaved, states that "I think it is folly to have faith in gods", never performing another blót (sacrifice), a position described in the sagas as goðlauss, "godless". Jacob Grimm in his Teutonic Mythology observes that:

It is remarkable that Old Norse legend occasionally mentions certain men who, turning away in utter disgust and doubt from the heathen faith, placed their reliance on their own strength and virtue. Thus in the Sôlar lioð 17 we read of Vêbogi and Râdey á sjálf sig þau trûðu, "in themselves they trusted".

== Terminology ==
- Misotheism first appears in the Chambers Dictionary in 1907. The Greek μισόθεος (misotheos) is found in Aeschylus (Agamemnon 1090). The English word appears as a nonce-coinage, used by Thomas De Quincey in 1846. It is comparable to the original meaning of Greek atheos of "rejecting the gods, rejected by the gods, godforsaken". The term's formation from miso- connotes a decidedly negative attitude (hatred) towards the gods, rather than one which is content to only oppose a specific set of their properties. Bernard Schweizer (2002) stated "that the English vocabulary seems to lack a suitable word for outright hatred of God... [even though] history records a number of outspoken misotheists", believing "misotheism" to be his original coinage. Applying the term to the work of Philip Pullman (His Dark Materials), Schweizer clarifies that he does not mean the term to carry the negative connotations of misanthropy: "To me, the word connotes a heroic stance of humanistic affirmation and the courage to defy the powers that rule the universe."
- Dystheism is the belief that God exists but is not wholly good, or that he might even be evil. The opposite concept is eutheism, the belief that God exists and is wholly good. Eutheism and dystheism are straightforward Greek formations from eu- and dys- + theism, paralleling atheism; δύσθεος in the sense of "godless, ungodly" appearing e.g. in Aeschylus (Agamemnon 1590). The terms are nonce coinages, used by University of Texas at Austin philosophy professor Robert C. Koons in a 1998 lecture. According to Koons, "eutheism is the thesis that God exists and is wholly good, [... while] dystheism is the thesis that God exists but is not wholly good." However, many proponents of dystheistic ideas (including Elie Wiesel and David Blumenthal) do not offer those ideas in the spirit of hating God. Their work notes God's apparent evil or at least indifferent disinterest in the welfare of humanity, but does not express hatred towards him because of it. A notable usage of the concept that the gods are either indifferent or actively hostile towards humanity is expressed in H. P. Lovecraft's literary philosophy of Cosmic indifferentism, which pervades the Cthulhu Mythos.

Historical accounts record the Greek root appearing in Aeschylus. Recent accounts distinguish misotheism, an attitude of hatred or moral opposition toward a deity, from dystheism (a deity not wholly good) and antitheism (opposition to theism). Schweizer taxonifies this historically prevalent attitude into agonistic, political, and absolute forms, and traces a genealogy. He further treats misotheism as a strand of "religious dissent" that accepts a deity’s existence while rejecting divine goodness, modern primers likewise present it as a moral protest tradition (e.g., Dostoevsky’s "Rebellion"), not mere disbelief, in his 2010 book Hating God: The Untold Story of Misotheism. However, in contrast to characterization of the greatest form of misotheism as "exult[ation] in the demise of deity", and specifically that "[n]o variety of atheism is really compatible with misotheism", over the course of the book citing five self-identified atheists or agnostics, Bodges writing for Patheos cites a "perceptive" atheist who, citing the well-documented paradox of fiction which describes an emotional response to characters known not to be real as normative, characterizes the issue of existence of any deity toward the question as "irrelevant".

- Maltheism is an ad-hoc coining appearing on Usenet in 1985, referring to the belief in God's malevolence inspired by the thesis of Tim Maroney that "even if a God as described in the Bible does exist, he is not fit for worship due to his low moral standards." The same term has also seen use among designers and players of role-playing games to describe a world with a malevolent deity.
- Antitheism is direct opposition to theism. As such, it is generally manifested more as an opposition to belief in a god (to theism per se) than as opposition to gods themselves, making it more associated with antireligion, although Buddhism is generally considered to be a religion despite its status with respect to theism being more nebulous. Antitheism by this definition does not necessarily imply belief in any sort of god at all, it simply stands in opposition to the idea of theistic religion. Under this definition, antitheism is a rejection of theism that does not necessarily imply belief in gods on the part of the antitheist. Some might equate any form of antitheism to an overt opposition to God, since these beliefs run contrary to the idea of making devotion to God the highest priority in life, although those ideas would imply that God exists, and that he wishes to be worshiped, or to be believed in.
- Certain forms of dualism make the assertion that the thing worshiped as God in this world is actually an evil impostor, but that a true benevolent deity worthy of being called "God" exists beyond this world. Thus, the Gnostics (see Sethian, Ophites) believed that God (the deity worshiped by Jews, Greek Pagan philosophers and Christians) was really an evil creator or demiurge that stood between us and some greater, more truly benevolent real deity. Similarly, Marcionites depicted God as represented in the Old Testament as a wrathful, malicious demiurge.

== Theodicy ==
Dystheistic speculation arises from consideration of the problem of evil — the question of why God, who is supposedly omnipotent, omniscient, and omnibenevolent, would allow evil to exist in the world. Koons notes that this is a theological problem only for a eutheist, since a dystheist would not find the existence of evil (or God's authorship of it) to be an obstacle to theistic belief. In fact, the dystheistic option would be a consistent non-contradictory response to the problem of evil. Thus Koons concludes that the problem of theodicy (explaining how God can be good despite the apparent contradiction presented in the problem of evil) does not pose a challenge to all possible forms of theism (i.e., that the problem of evil does not present a contradiction to someone who would believe that God exists but that he is not necessarily good).

This conclusion implicitly takes the first horn of the Euthyphro dilemma, asserting the independence of good and evil morality from God (as God is defined in monotheistic belief). Historically, the notion of "good" as an absolute concept has emerged in parallel with the notion of God being the singular entity identified with good. In this sense, dystheism amounts to the abandonment of a central feature of historical monotheism: the de facto association of God with the summum bonum.

Arthur Schopenhauer wrote: "This world could not have been the work of an all-loving being, but that of a devil, who had brought creatures into existence in order to delight in the sight of their sufferings."

Critics of Calvin's doctrines of predestination frequently argued that Calvin's doctrines did not successfully avoid describing God as "the author of evil".

Much of post-Holocaust theology, especially in Judaic theological circles, is devoted to a rethinking of God's goodness. Examples include the work of David R. Blumenthal, author of Facing the Abusing God (1993) and John K. Roth, whose essay "A Theodicy of Protest" is included in Encountering Evil: Live Options in Theodicy (1982):

Everything hinges on the proposition that God possesses—but fails to use well enough—the power to intervene decisively at any moment to make history's course less wasteful. Thus, in spite and because of his sovereignty, this God is everlastingly guilty and the degrees run from gross negligence to mass murder... To the extent that [people] are born with the potential and power to [do evil things], credit for that fact belongs elsewhere. "Elsewhere" is God's address.

== Deus deceptor ==
The deus deceptor (dieu trompeur, 'deceptive god'), is a concept of Cartesianism. Voetius accused Descartes of blasphemy in 1643. Jacques Triglandius and Jacobus Revius, theologians at Leiden University, made similar accusations in 1647, accusing Descartes of "hold[ing] God to be a deceiver", a position that they stated to be "contrary to the glory of God". Descartes was threatened with having his views condemned by a synod, but this was prevented by the intercession of the Prince of Orange (at the request of the French Ambassador Servien). The accusations referenced a passage in the First Meditation where Descartes stated that he supposed not an optimal God but rather an evil demon "summe potens & callidus" ("most highly powerful and cunning"). The accusers identified Descartes' concept of a deus deceptor with his concept of an evil demon, stating that only an omnipotent God is "summe potens" and that describing the evil demon as such thus demonstrated the identity. Descartes' response to the accusations was that in that passage he had been expressly distinguishing between "the supremely good God, the source of truth, on the one hand, and the malicious demon on the other". He did not directly rebut the charge of implying that the evil demon was omnipotent, but asserted that simply describing something with "some attribute that in reality belongs only to God" does not mean that that something is being held to actually be a supreme God.

The evil demon is omnipotent, Christian doctrine notwithstanding, and is seen as a key requirement for Descartes' argument by Cartesian scholars such as Alguié, Beck, Émile Bréhier, Chevalier, Frankfurt, Étienne Gilson, Anthony Kenny, Laporte, Kemp-Smith, and Wilson. The progression through the First Meditation, leading to the introduction of the concept of the evil genius at the end, is to introduce various categories into the set of dubitables, such as mathematics (i.e. Descartes' addition of 2 and 3 and counting the sides of a square). Although the hypothetical evil genius is never stated to be one and the same as the hypothetical "deus deceptor," (God the deceiver) the inference by the reader that they are is a natural one, and the requirement that the deceiver is capable of introducing deception even into mathematics is seen by commentators as a necessary part of Descartes' argument. Scholars contend that in fact Descartes was not introducing a new hypothetical, merely couching the idea of a deceptive God in terms that would not be offensive.

Paul Erdős, the eccentric and extremely prolific Hungarian-born mathematician, referred to the notion of deus deceptor in a humorous context when he called God "the Supreme Fascist", who deliberately hid things from people, ranging from socks and passports to the most elegant of mathematical proofs. A similar sentiment is expressed by Douglas Adams in The Hitchhikers Guide to the Galaxy in reference to the temptation of Adam and Eve by God:

[God] puts an apple tree in the middle of [the Garden of Eden] and says, do what you like guys, oh, but don't eat the apple. Surprise surprise, they eat it and he leaps out from behind a bush shouting "Gotcha." It wouldn't have made any difference if they hadn't eaten it...Because if you're dealing with somebody who has the sort of mentality which likes leaving hats on the pavement with bricks under them you know perfectly well they won't give up. They'll get you in the end.

== In Jewish and Christian scriptures ==
There are various examples of arguable dystheism in the Bible, sometimes cited as arguments for atheism (e.g. Bertrand Russell 1957), most of them from the Pentateuch. A notable exception is the Book of Job, a classical case study of theodicy, which can be argued to consciously discuss the possibility of dystheism (e.g. Carl Jung, Answer to Job).

Thomas Paine wrote in The Age of Reason that "whenever we read the obscene stories, the voluptuous debaucheries, the cruel and torturous executions, the unrelenting vindictiveness, with which more than half the Bible is filled, it would be more consistent that we called it the word of a demon than the word of God." But Paine's perspective was a deistic one, critical more of common beliefs about God than of God himself.

The New Testament contains references to an "evil god", specifically the "prince of this world" (John 14:30, ὁ τοῦ κόσμου τούτου ἄρχων) or "god of this world" (2 Corinthians 4:4, ὁ θεὸς τοῦ αἰῶνος τούτου) who has "blinded the minds of men". Mainstream Christian theology sees these as references to Satan ("the Devil"), but Gnostics, Marcionites, and Manicheans saw these as references to Yahweh (God) himself.

== In art and literature ==
Misotheistic and/or dystheistic expression has a long history in the arts and in literature. Bernard Schweizer's book Hating God: The Untold Story of Misotheism is devoted to this topic. He traces the history of ideas behind misotheism from the Book of Job, via Epicureanism and the twilight of Roman paganism, to deism, anarchism, Nietzschean philosophy, feminism, and radical humanism. The main literary figures in his study are Percy Bysshe Shelley, Algernon Swinburne, Zora Neale Hurston, Rebecca West, Elie Wiesel, Peter Shaffer, and Philip Pullman. Schweizer argues that literature is the preferred medium for the expression of God-hatred because the creative possibilities of literature allow writers to simultaneously unburden themselves of their misotheism while ingeniously veiling their blasphemy.

Other examples include:

- Goethe's Prometheus
- the work of the Marquis de Sade
- Emily Dickinson's poem "Apparently With No Surprise" depicts God as approving of suffering in the world, relating the tale of a flower "beheaded" by a late frost as the sun "measure[s] off another day for an approving God".
- Mark Twain (himself a Deist) argued against what he saw as the petty God many followed in a posthumously published book, The Bible According to Mark Twain: Writings on Heaven, Eden, and the Flood. He talks, in part, about the African "sleeping sickness", malaria.
- Ivan Karamazov in Fyodor Dostoevsky's 1879 The Brothers Karamazov articulates what might be termed a dystheistic rejection of God. Koons covered this argument in the lecture immediately following the one referenced above. It was also discussed by Peter S. Fosl in his essay titled "The Moral Imperative to Rebel Against God".
- Konrad, the protagonist of Adam Mickiewicz's Forefathers' Eve, is close to calling the God a tsar, an ultimate evil (since when Mickiewicz wrote his work, Poland was under Russian occupation). He wants to do that, because God didn't respond to his pleas about giving him the power to rule over people's emotion. He loses his strength, and Satan does it for him.

In more recent times, the sentiment is present in a variety of media:

=== Poetry and drama ===
The characters in several of Tennessee Williams' plays express dystheistic attitudes, including the Rev. T. Lawrence Shannon in The Night of the Iguana.

Robert Frost's poem "Design" questions how God could have created death if he were benevolent.

Peter Shaffer's play Amadeus (1979) has the character Salieri rebel against a God he feels neglected and humiliated by.

In Jewish author Elie Wiesel's play The Trial of God (1979), the survivors of a pogrom, in which most of the inhabitants of a 17th-century Jewish village were massacred, put God on trial for his cruelty and indifference to their misery. The play is based on an actual trial Wiesel participated in that was conducted by inmates of the Auschwitz concentration camp during the Nazi holocaust, but it also references a number of other incidents in Jewish history including a similar trial conducted by the Hasidic Rabbi Levi Yosef Yitzhak of Berdichev:

Men and women are being beaten, tortured and killed. True, they are victims of men. But the killers kill in God's name. Not all? True, but let one killer kill for God's glory, and God is guilty. Every person who suffers or causes suffering, every woman who is raped, every child who is tormented implicates Him. What, you need more? A hundred or a thousand? Listen, either he is responsible or he is not. If he is, let's judge him. If he is not, let him stop judging us.

In Alan Parker's Oscar-winning 1980 feature film Fame, one of the main characters (played by Barry Miller) makes an explicit statement against God. Playing an aspiring stand-up comedian who is asked in an acting class to talk about an experience that has affected him deeply in order to sharpen his skills as a performer, he delivers an extended uncut monologue (rare for a mainstream Hollywood film at that time) that heavily criticizes both modern capitalism and religion, concluding with the line "and then we can all go pray to the asshole God who fucked everything up in the first place".

=== Modern literature ===
Several non-Jewish authors share Wiesel's concerns about God's nature, including Salman Rushdie (The Satanic Verses, Shalimar the Clown) and Anne Provoost (In the Shadow of the Ark):

Why would you trust a God that doesn't give us the right book? Throughout history, he's given the Jewish people a book, he's given the Christians a book, and he's given the Muslims books, and there are big similarities between these books, but there are also contradictions. ... He needs to come back and create clarity and not ... let us fight over who's right. He should make it clear. So, my personal answer to your question, "Should we trust [a God who can't get things right]", I wouldn't.

The writing of Sir Kingsley Amis contains some misotheistic themes; e.g. in The Green Man (God's appearance as the young man), and in The Anti-Death League (the anonymous poem received by the chaplain).

=== Speculative fiction ===
A number of speculative fiction works present a dystheistic perspective, at least as far back as the works of H. P. Lovecraft and Olaf Stapledon's influential philosophical short novel Star Maker.

By the 1970s, Harlan Ellison even described dystheism as a bit of a science fiction cliché. Ellison himself has dealt with the theme in his "The Deathbird", the title story of Deathbird Stories, a collection based on the theme of (for the most part) malevolent modern-day gods. Lester del Rey's "Evensong" (the first story in Harlan Ellison's much-acclaimed Dangerous Visions anthology), tells the story of a fugitive God hunted down across the universe by a vengeful humanity which seeks to "put him in his place". "Faith of Our Fathers" by Philip K. Dick, also from the same anthology, features a horrifying vision of a being, possibly God, who is all-devouring and amoral. Philip Pullman's previously mentioned trilogy, His Dark Materials, presented the theme of a negligent or evil God to a wider audience, as depicted in the 2007 film The Golden Compass based on the first book of this trilogy.

The original series of Star Trek featured episodes with dystheistic themes, amongst them "The Squire of Gothos", "Who Mourns for Adonais?", "For the World Is Hollow and I Have Touched the Sky", and "The Return of the Archons". In "Encounter at Farpoint", the pilot episode of Star Trek: The Next Generation, Captain Jean-Luc Picard informs Q, a trickster with god-like powers similar to the antagonist in the aforementioned "Squire of Gothos" episode, that 24th-century humans no longer had any need to depend upon or worship god figures. This is an amplification of the tempered anti-theistic sentiment from "Who Mourns for Adonais?", in which Captain James T. Kirk tells Apollo that "Mankind has no need for gods, we find the one quite adequate." A later episode, "Who Watches the Watchers", depicts accidentally reviving theistic belief in a more primitive species as a negative thing which must be stopped. In Star Trek: Deep Space Nine, it is revealed that the Klingon creation myth involves the first Klingons killing the gods who created them because "they were more trouble than they were worth."

In the film Pitch Black, anti-hero protagonist Richard B. Riddick stated his own belief after an imam accuses him of atheism: "Think someone could spend half their life in a slam with a horse bit in their mouth and not believe? Think he could start out in some liquor store trash bin with an umbilical cord wrapped around his neck and not believe? Got it all wrong, holy man. I absolutely believe in God... and I absolutely hate the fucker."

Robert A. Heinlein's book Job: A Comedy of Justice, which is mostly about religious institutions, ends with an appearance by Yahweh which is far from complimentary.

The Athar, a fictional organization from the D&D's Planescape Campaign Setting denies the divinity of the setting's deities. They do, however, tend to worship "The Great Unknown" in their place. In the Pathfinder universe, the nation of Rahadoum bans the worship of the setting's deities. They do not deny the deities' power or divinity, but instead believe that worshiping a deity is akin to enslaving ones' self and that mortals' problems are best solved without the interference of higher powers.

In the 2013 film Prisoners, Holly Jones and her husband Isaac lost their faith in God after their son died of cancer. Since then, they have been kidnapping and murdering children in order to make other parents lose faith in God and turning them into revenge-driven hollow shells of their former selves, i.e. spreading their misotheism to other people. As Holly Jones states to Keller Dover near the end of the film: "Making children disappear is the war we wage with God. Makes people lose their faith, turns them into demons like you."

In the DC Extended Universe film Batman v Superman: Dawn of Justice, Lex Luthor has a misotheistic view of God, believing that if God was omnipotent, then he logically could not be omnibenevolent and vice versa (the theological problem of evil), thereby solidifying his belief that power cannot be innocent. He has a penchant for constantly implementing allusions to major figures of both pagan and biblical theology, with him notably comparing himself to Prometheus, General Zod to Icarus, and Superman to Zeus, Horus, Apollo, Jehovah, and Satan. He even compares himself to the biblical God in one way, claiming to hate "the sin, not the sinner", and plays God by creating the monster Doomsday.

In the season 1 of Luke Cage, Willis Stryker's misotheism seemed to enforce his revenge mission against his half-brother Luke Cage, quoting several Bible verses that directly link to Lukes's supposed betrayal against Stryker. The Judas Bullet was designed to symbolize this act of treachery; stating "one Judas to another" before shooting Luke in the abdomen and vowing to repeat the same words that Cain said to his father after killing Abel when he finally did kill Cage.

Gorr the God Butcher is a prime example of misotheism in Marvel Comics. Created by Jason Aaron and Esad Ribić in 2013, this character embodies misotheism through his crusade to exterminate all deities in the universe after discovering their indifference to mortal suffering. Gorr's characterization illustrates how misotheism can arise from the betrayal of religious expectations rather than simple disbelief. The character, portrayed by Christian Bale, was later adapted in the film Thor: Love and Thunder (2022), bringing this depiction of misotheism to a wider audience.

=== Popular music ===
Misotheism is a 2008 album by Belgian black metal band Gorath. A black metal band from Trondheim, Norway is named Misotheist.

Dystheistic sentiment has also made its way into popular music, evincing itself in controversial songs like "Dear God" by the band XTC (later covered by Sarah McLachlan) and "Blasphemous Rumours" by Depeche Mode, which tells the story of a teenage girl who attempted suicide, survived, and turned her life over to God, only to be hit by a car, wind up on life support, and eventually die. A good deal of Gary Numan's work, specifically the album Exile, is laden with misotheistic themes.

The output of Oscar-winning songwriter/composer Randy Newman also includes several songs expressing dystheistic sentiment, including the ironic "He Gives Us All His Love" and the more overtly maltheistic "God's Song (That's Why I Love Mankind)", both from his acclaimed 1972 album Sail Away. In the latter song, Newman bemoans the futility of dealing with God whose attitude towards humanity he sees as one of contempt and cruelty.

The song "God Made" by Andrew Jackson Jihad proposes dystheism and has an implied hatred for God. More specifically, their song "Be Afraid of Jesus" is about a vengeful Christ although this could be a critique of fundamentalist hate speech.

"God Am" by Alice in Chains from their self-titled album has many misotheistic themes about the perceived apathy of God towards the evil in this world.

"Godwhacker" by Steely Dan from their Everything Must Go album developed from a lyric frontman Donald Fagen wrote a few days after his mother died of Alzheimer's. "It's about an elite squad of assassins whose sole assignment is to find a way into heaven and take out God", he later explained. "If the Deity actually existed, what sane person wouldn't consider this to be justifiable homicide?"

In the song "Terrible Lie" by Nine Inch Nails, Trent Reznor expresses anger, confusion, and sadness towards God and the world he created.

"Judith" by A Perfect Circle is a satirical song that places blame on God for the illness of the lead singer's mother, Judith. Despite her deteriorating condition, Judith never questions why she has been placed in her predicament but instead continues to praise and worship God. Her son angrily mocks god and presents arguments as to why she shouldn't have to suffer.

Marilyn Manson's "Fight Song", "Say10", and others have direct and indirect misotheistic themes.

American death metal bands Deicide and Morbid Angel base much of their lyrics around misotheism in name and in concept. Many bands in the black metal genre, such as Mayhem, Emperor, Gorgoroth and Darkthrone express extreme misotheism in their lyrics.

=== Modern art ===
In 2006, Australian artist Archie Moore created a paper sculpture called "Maltheism", which was considered for a Telstra Art Award in 2006. The piece was intended as a representation of a church made from pages of the Book of Deuteronomy:

...and within its text is the endorsement from God to Moses for invasion of other nations. It says that you have the right to invade, take all their resources, kill all the men (non-believers) and make no treaty with them.

== See also ==
- Criticism of religion
- Deontological ethics
- Divine command theory
- Ethics in the Bible
- Evil God challenge
- Free will
- God is dead
- History of atheism
- Lawsuits against God
- Love of God
- Meta-ethics
- Moral absolutism
- Nihilism
- Omnibenevolence
- Problem of Hell
- Religious extremism
- Religious fundamentalism
- Theistic Satanism
- Utilitarianism
- Virtue ethics
- Richard Dawkins

== General and cited references ==
- Blumenthal, David R. (1993). Facing the Abusing God: A Theology of Protest. Louisville, KY: Westminster John Knox Press, 1993. p. 348. ISBN 0-664-25464-0.
- Ehrman, Bart D. (2008). God's Problem: How the Bible Fails to Answer Our Most Important Question--Why We Suffer. New York, NY: HarperOne, 2008. pp. 304. ISBN 978-0-06-117397-4.
- Mirabello, Mark, The Crimes of Jehovah (1997), ISBN 1-884365-13-2.
- Naylor, Janet; Julian, Caroline; Pinsonneault, Susan (1994). GURPS Religion. Austin, TX: Steve Jackson Games, 1994. p. 176. ISBN 1-55634-202-0.
- Phillips, D. Z. (2005). The Problem of Evil and The Problem of God. Minneapolis, MN: Augsburg Fortress, 2005. p. 280. ISBN 0-8006-3775-5.
- Provoost, Anne (2004). In the Shadow of the Ark. Minneapolis, MN: Arthur A. Levine, 2004. p. 384. ISBN 0-439-44234-6.
- Roth, John K.; et al. (1982). Encountering Evil: Live Options in Theodicy. Louisville, KY: Westminster John Knox Press, 1982. pp. 182. ISBN 0-8042-0517-5.
- Russell, Bertrand (1957). Why I Am Not A Christian. New York, NY: Simon & Schuster, 1957. pp. 266. ASIN B000JX1TIK.
- Sutherland, Robert (2006). Putting God on Trial: The Biblical Book of Job. Victoria, BC: Trafford Publishing, 2006. p. 226. ISBN 1-4120-1847-1. Archived from the original on 2015-11-04.
- Schweizer, Bernard (2010). Hating God: The Untold Story of Misotheism. New York: Oxford University Press, 2010. p. 246. ISBN 978-0-19-975138-9.
- Schweizer, Bernard (2002). Rebecca West: Heroism, Rebellion, and the Female Epic. Westport, CT: Greenwood Press, 2002. p. 184. ISBN 0-313-32360-7.
- Wiesel, Elie (1979). The Trial of God. New York, NY: Random House, 1979. p. 208. ISBN 0-8052-1053-9.
