= Woldemar von Biedermann =

Gustav Woldemar Freiherr von Biedermann (5 March 1817, Marienberg – 6 February 1903, Dresden) was a jurist, literary historian, and Goethe researcher.

== Life and work ==
The son of the jurist and politician Gustav Heinrich Freiherr von Biederman, Woldemar von Biedermann studied legal science in Leipzig and Heidelberg from 1836 to 1839. After a period as a solicitor, he entered the Saxon civil service in 1845. In 1849 he found employment in the railway industry first as the government commissioner to the Executive board of the Chemnitz-Riesa railway company (German: Chemnitz-Riseaer Eisenbahngesellschaft), as railway director in Chemnitz in 1851, in Leipzig in 1858, and in 1869 as Finance and Deputy Director-General of the Royal Saxon State Railways–a cabinet post. His son, Flodoard von Biedermann, urged him to publish his assemblage of recorded conversations of Goethe. This collected work was published between 1889 and 1896 in 10 volumes.

Other published writings include more than 180 critical and technical contributions to the Goethe literature. He edited several volumes of the Weimar (Sophie) Edition of Goethe's works, an effort for which he received an honorary doctorate from the philosophy department at the University of Leipzig.

Biedermann died in Dresden in 1903 and was buried in the Alte Annenfriedhof.

== Works ==
[For titles in the original German, see the German Wikipedia entry]

- Goethe and Leipzig (Leipzig 1865, 2 Volumes);
- Concerning Goethe's Poetry (Leipzig 1870);
- Goethe and Dresden (Leipzig 1875);
- Goethe and the Saxon Ore Mountains (Stuttgart 1877);
- Goethe Studies. 3 volumes. Leipzig: Biedermann 1879-1889;
- Goethe's Conversations. Complete edition. Authenticated by Woldemar Freiherr von Biedermann. New edition by Flodoard von Biedermann in collaboration with Max Morris, Hans Gerhard Gräf and Leonhard Leopold Mackall. Second revised and greatly expanded edition;
- Goethe's letters to Eichstädt. Berlin: Hempel 1872;
- Goethes correspondence with Friedrich Rochlitz. Leipzig: Biedermann, 1887.
