= Goethe-Handbuch =

Reference work about Johann Wolfgang von Goethe

- Gedichte; Dramen; Prosaschriften; Personen, Sachen, Begriffe
- Edited by: Bernd Witte; Theo Buck; Hans-Dietrich Dahnke; Regine Otto; Peter Schmidt
- Country: Germany
- Language: German
- Genre: reference work
- Publisher: J.B. Metzler
- Published: 1996–1999

Goethe-Handbuch (lit. 'Goethe Handbook') is a reference work about the German writer and philosopher Johann Wolfgang von Goethe. It was published in 1996–1999 by J.B. Metzler and consists of four volumes, of which the fourth is in two parts, and an unnumbered index volume. It was edited at the Heinrich Heine University Düsseldorf with financial backing from the Klassik Stiftung Weimar. The editors were Bernd Witte, Theo Buck, Hans-Dietrich Dahnke, Regine Otto and Peter Schmidt. Three supplement volumes were published in 2008–2012.

== Volumes ==
1. Gedichte (lit. 'Poems'), 1996
2. Dramen (lit. 'Dramas'), 1996
3. Prosaschriften (lit. 'Prose Writings'), 1997
4. Personen, Sachen, Begriffe (lit. 'People, Things, Concepts'), 1998
  1. A - K
  2. L - Z
- Chronologie, Bibliographie, Karten, Register (lit. 'Chronology, Bibliography, Maps, Index'), 1999

Supplements

1. Musik und Tanz in den Bühnenwerken (lit. 'Music and Dance in the Stage Works'), 2008, edited by Gabriele Busch-Salmen and Benedikt Jeßing
2. Naturwissenschaften (lit. 'Natural Sciences'), 2012, edited by Manfred Wenzel
3. Kunst (lit. 'Art'), 2011, edited by Andreas Beyer and Ernst Osterkamp
