= Museum der Weltkulturen =

Ethnological museum in Germany

Coordinates: 50°06′20″N 8°40′44″E

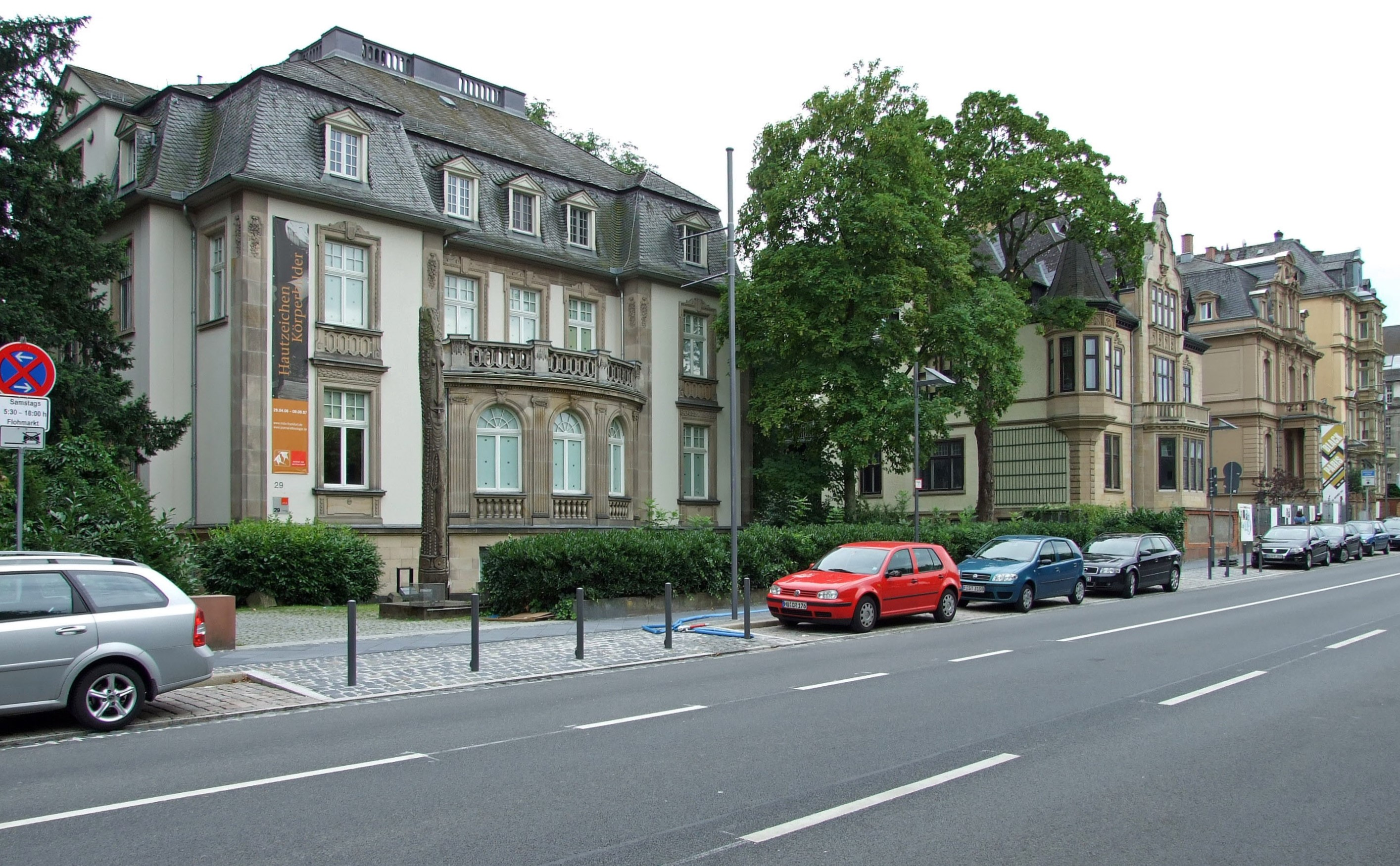
The three buildings of the museum.

Museumsufer Frankfurt
Museums of the Museumsufer, Frankfurt am Main
South Bank
1 Hindemith Kabinett im Kuhhirtenturm (de)
2 Icon Museum (de) (Museum of Orthodox sacred Art)
3 Portikus (Exhibition hall for contemporary art)
4 Museum Angewandte Kunst (Applied Arts)
5 Museum der Weltkulturen (Ethnological Museum)
6 Deutsches Filmmuseum (de) (German Film Museum)
7 German Architecture Museum
8 Museum für Kommunikation
9 Städel (Fine Arts Museum)
10 Liebieghaus (Classical sculpture collection)
11 Museum Giersch (Art and culture of Rhine-Main)
North Bank
12 Jewish Museum Frankfurt
13 Frankfurt Archaeological Museum (de)
14 Historical Museum, Frankfurt
15 Caricatura Museum Frankfurt
16 Schirn Kunsthalle Frankfurt (Art exhibition venue)
17 Museum für Moderne Kunst (Modern Art Museum)
18 Frankfurter Judengasse Museum (Preserved foundations from the Ghetto)
19 Deutsches Romantik-Museum / Goethe House
External
20 Naturmuseum Senckenberg (Westend, Frankfurt)
21 Eintracht Frankfurt Museum (Waldstadion)
22 German Leather Museum (Offenbach)
23 Klingspor Museum (Offenbach)

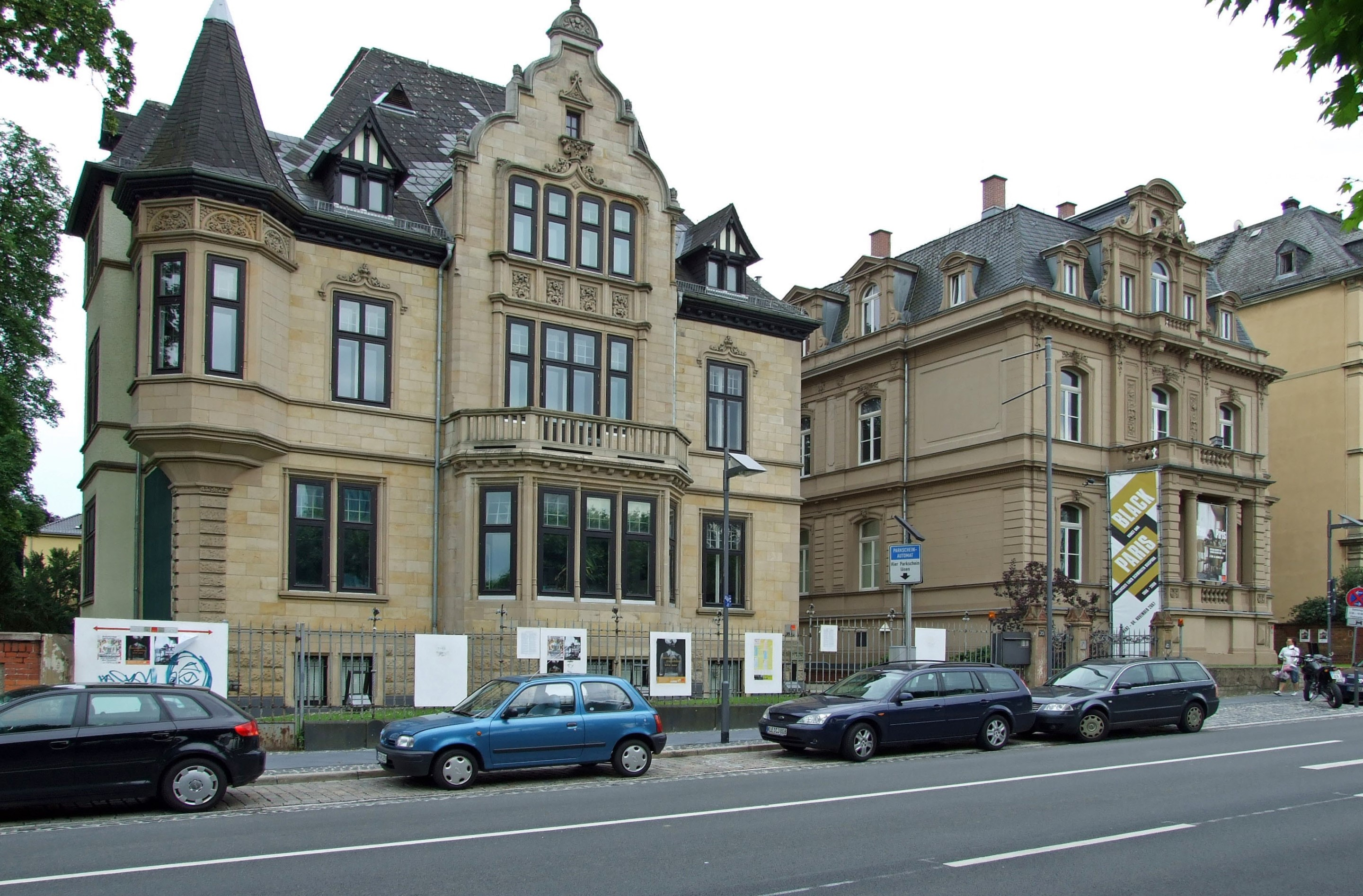
The villa and Gallery 37.

The Museum of World Cultures (German: Museum der Weltkulturen) is an ethnological museum in Frankfurt, Germany. Until 2001 it was called the Museum of Ethnology (Museum für Völkerkunde). It is part of Frankfurt's Museumsufer (Museum Riverbank).

== History ==
It was founded in 1904, as a civic institution, to bring together the ethnographic collections of the city of Frankfurt. In 1908 the museum moved into the Palais Thurn und Taxis in the city centre. In 1925 the city acquired the collections of the Institute of Cultural Morphology (today the Frobenius Institute), founded by the ethnologist Leo Frobenius. He relocated to Frankfurt along with the institute and become an honorary professor of the University of Frankfurt. In 1934 he became the director of the museum. The roles of museum director and institute director continued to be occupied by the same person (including Frobenius's successors) until 1966, when the university became state-run, since when the museum has again been run by the city.

Significant parts of the collection were lost when the Palais was destroyed by bombs in World War II. However, some items had already been evacuated from the Palais – these survived the war, and in 1973 they were put on display in an old villa on the banks of the Main, where they have been ever since. The Museum of World Cultures therefore counts as one of the earliest museums on what is now the Museumsufer.

The museum has expanded since 1973 and now occupies three adjacent buildings on the Schaumainkai – nos. 29 (the main building), 35 (the original villa), and 37 ("Gallery 37"), which were acquired and/or rebuilt in the 1980s. The collections include over 65,000 objects from Oceania, Australia, Southeast Asia, the Americas, Africa and Europe. Gallery 37 hosts exhibitions of contemporary works by Indian, African, Oceanian and Indonesian artists.

In 2010, plans were announced for a new phase of construction to further expand the museum.

The directors of the Museum der Weltkulturen are:

- 1904–1919: Bernhard Hagen
- 1919–1935: Johannes Lehmann, Interimsdirektor
- 1935–1938: Leo Frobenius
- 1938–1939: Adolf E. Jensen, Interimsdirektor
- 1940–1945: Karin Hissink
- 1946–1965: Adolf E. Jensen
- 1965–1966: Carl August Schmitz
- 1966–1971: Herrmann Niggemeyer
- 1972–1983: Heinz Kelm
- 1984–1985: Johanna Agthe, Interimsdirektorin
- 1985–1998: Franz Josef Thiel
- 1998–2000: Johanna Agthe, Interimsdirektorin
- 2000–2008: Anette Rein
- 2008–2010: Christine Stelzig
- 2010–2015: Clementine Deliss
- 2015–2019: Eva Raabe, kommissarische Direktorin
- since 1 October 2019: Eva Raabe

== See also ==
- List of museums in Germany
