= Heuberger =

Heuberger (Yiddish: הויבערגר; Hebrew: הויברגר) is a topographic surname of German and Ashkenazi Jewish origin, deriving from the region of Heuberg in Suebia. It is composed of the Middle High German "höu" (trans. hay) and "berg" (trans. mountain) meaning "hay mountain". Notable people with the surname Heuberger include:

- Georg Heuberger (1946–2010), German historian
- Ivo Heuberger (born 1976), Swiss tennis player
- Martin Heuberger (born 1964), German handball player
- Moritz Heuberger (born 1991), German politician
- Rami Heuberger (1963–2025), Israeli actor
- Renat Heuberger (born 1976), Swiss businessman
- Richard Heuberger (1850–1914), Austrian composer
- Robert Heuberger (1922–2021), Swiss businessman

== See also ==
- 82232 Heuberger, main-belt asteroid named after Robert Heuberger.
