= Jewish Museum Frankfurt =

Museum in Germany

Coordinates: 50°06′26″N 8°40′28″E

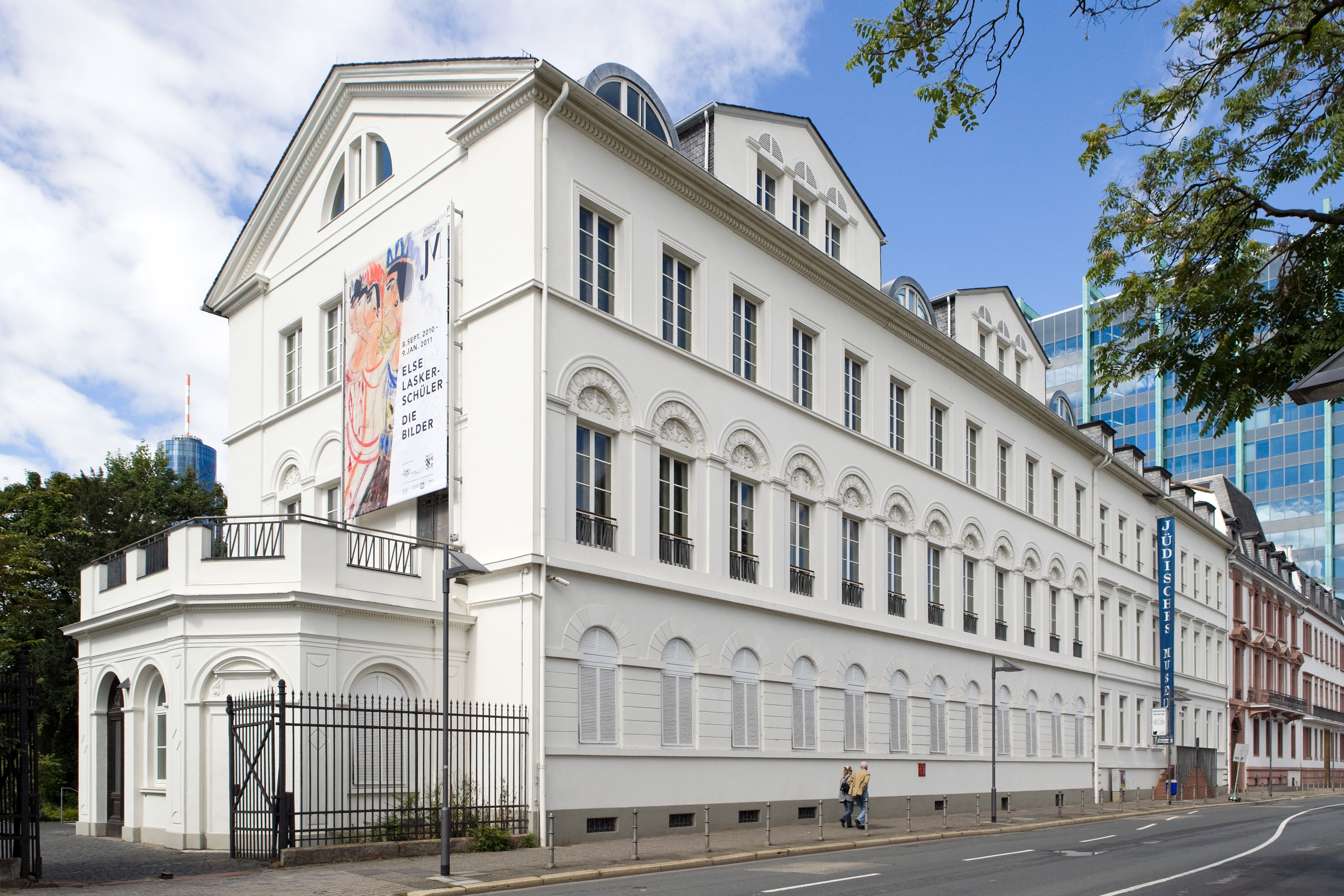
The Jewish Museum Frankfurt.

The Jewish Museum Frankfurt am Main is the oldest independent Jewish Museum in Germany. It was opened by Federal Chancellor Helmut Kohl on 9 November 1988, the 50th anniversary of Kristallnacht.

The Jewish Museum collects, preserves and communicates the nine-hundred-year-old Jewish history and culture of the City of Frankfurt from a European perspective. It has a permanent exhibition at two venues: the Museum Judengasse at Battonstraße 47 focuses on the theme of the history and culture of Jews in Frankfurt during the early modern period; the Jewish Museum in the Rothschildpalais at Untermainkai 14/15 presents Jewish history and culture since 1800. The museum was refurbished and expanded between 2015 and 2020.

The focus of the collection is on the areas ceremonial culture, fine arts and family history. The museum has extensive holdings related to the Rothschild family and the Anne Frank family which will be presented in the new permanent exhibition. The Ludwig Meidner Archive is responsible for the estates of the artists Ludwig Meidner, Jacob Steinhardt, Henry Gowa and others. In addition, the museum has an extensive library as well as a document and photograph collection related to German-Jewish history and culture.

== History ==
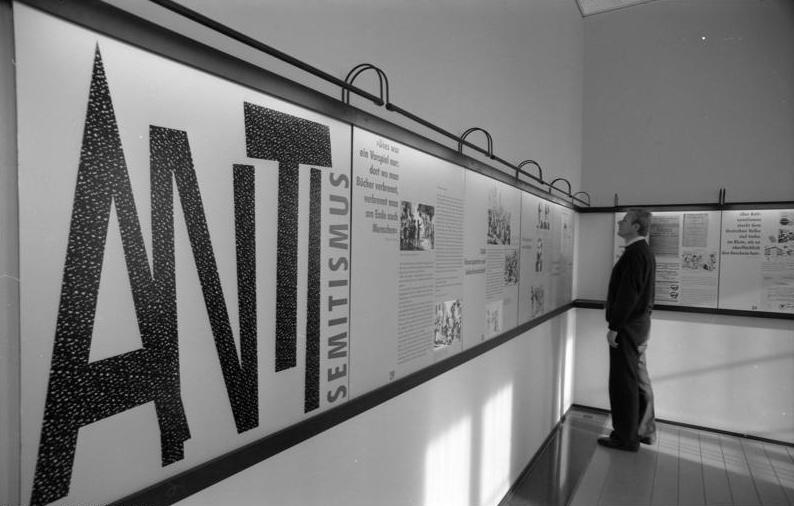
At the opening in 1988.

A museum of Jewish antiquities existed in Frankfurt even before the foundation of today's museum. It was opened in 1922 and was one of the first of its kind in Germany, showing mainly Jewish cult items. In 1938 the museum was destroyed by the National Socialists; only a few of the objects have been preserved in Frankfurt.

After the Second World War, former Jewish Frankfurt citizens who had emigrated to London proposed that a commission be set up to carry out research on the history of Frankfurt's Jews. Later, plans were conceived to found a Jewish Museum, support by the city councillor, Hilmar Hoffmann. In 1988 that museum opened in two classical villas on the Untermainkai, across the Main from the Schaumainkai. The villa at no. 14 was built for the banker Simon Moritz von Bethmann, and the one at no. 15 for Joseph Isaak Speyer. No. 14 was acquired by Mayer Carl von Rothschild in 1846, and became known as the Rothschild Palace. Both buildings were acquired by the city of Frankfurt in 1928. After the Second World War they served as the main site of the municipal and university library, and later as an outpost of the Historical Museum. From 1988 to 2006, Georg Heuberger was the director of the museum.

The museum is part of the Museumsufer.

== Museum Judengasse ==
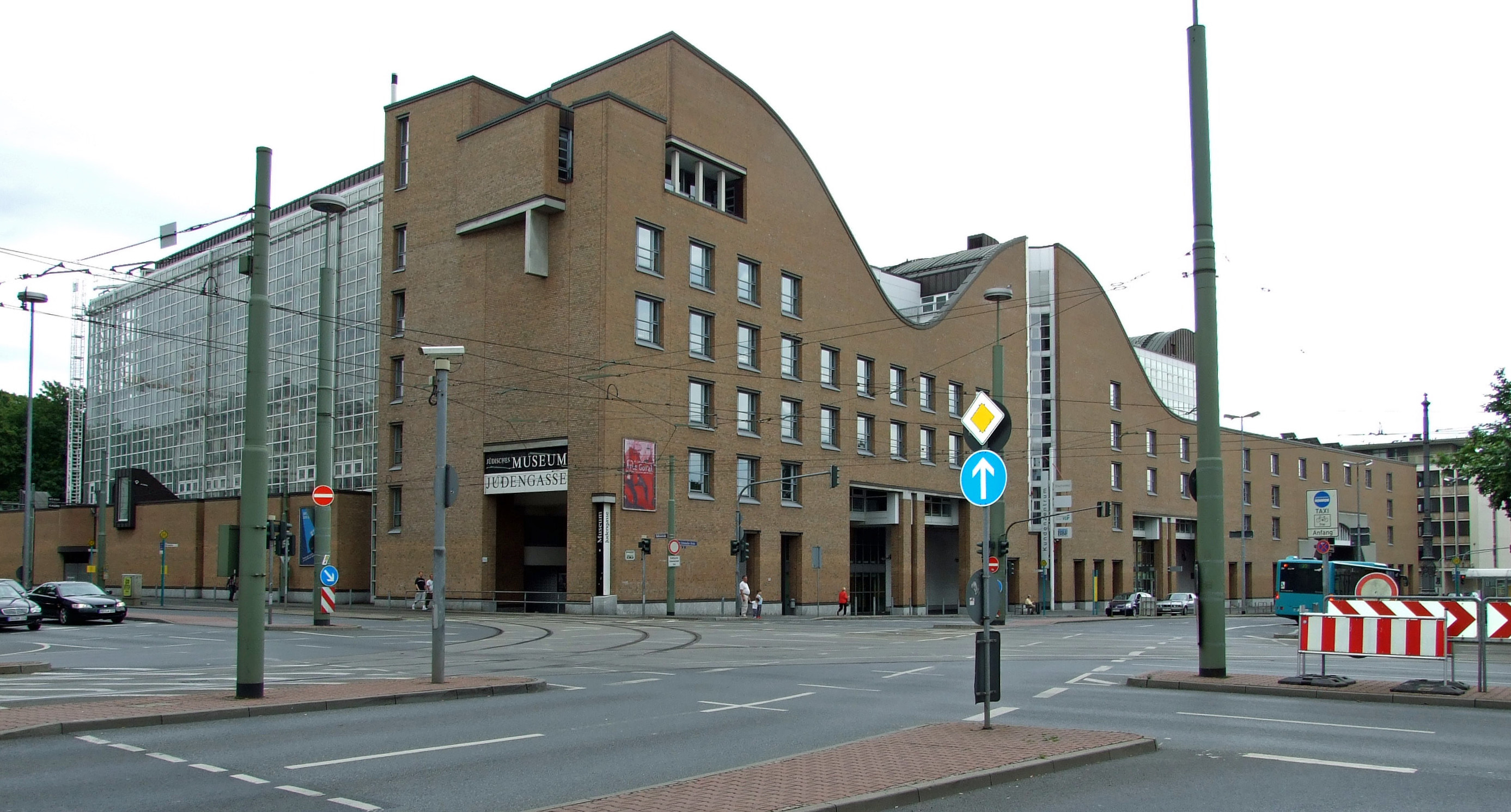
The Museum Judengasse.

In 1987 the foundations of 19 houses on what used to be called the Judengasse were discovered during construction work on an administrative building. The Frankfurt Judengasse was the first Jewish ghetto in Europe. It was founded in 1460 and developed into an important European Jewish cultural centre. The archaeological finds gave rise to a controversial debate as to how these witnesses of Jewish history in Frankfurt should be handled. The conflict resulted in a compromise: five of the unearthed house foundations were dismantled and reconstructed at the cellar level of the new administration building. In 1992 the Museum Judengasse was then opened among these ruins, as it were. The presentation there centres on the history and culture of Frankfurt's Jews from the Middle Ages to Jewish Emancipation. The Museum Judengasse borders both on a memorial site for the Frankfurt Jews murdered during the National Socialist era and on the second oldest Jewish cemetery in Germany. In 2016 the museum was reopened after reconstruction with a re-designed exhibition.

To commemorate the 650th anniversary of the Golden Bull of 1356, four museums in Frankfurt organised an exhibition called Die Kaisermacher ("The Emperor-Makers") from 2006 to 2007. The Museum Judengasse contributed archaeological findings, documenting in particular the role played by the Jews of Frankfurt as the Emperor's servi camerae regis.

== See also ==
- List of museums in Germany
- Frankfurter Judengasse
- History of the Jews in Germany
