= Hilmar Hoffmann =

German director, cultural politician and academic lecturer

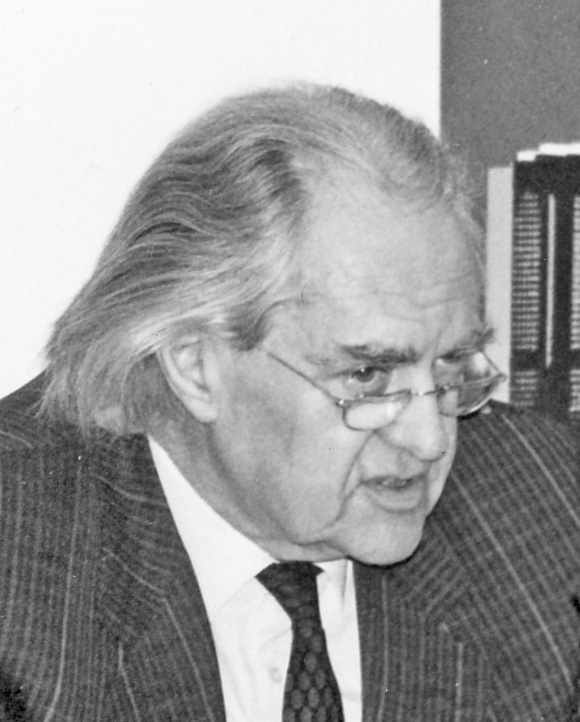
- Hoffmann in April 1989
- Born: 25 August 1925; Bremen, Germany
- Died: 1 June 2018 (aged 92); Frankfurt, Germany
- Education: Folkwang Hochschule
- Occupations: Stage director; Cultural politician; City councillor in Frankfurt; Lecturer

Hilmar Hoffmann (25 August 1925 – 1 June 2018) was a German stage and film director, cultural politician and academic lecturer. He founded the International Short Film Festival Oberhausen. He was for decades an influential city councillor in Frankfurt, where he initiated the Museumsufer of 15 museums, including the Jewish Museum Frankfurt. He was the president of the Goethe-Institut and taught at universities such as Bochum and Tel Aviv. He wrote the book Kultur für alle (Culture for All), which was a motto of his life and work.

== Biography ==
Hoffmann was born in Bremen on 25 August 1925, the son of an export merchant. He attended the gymnasium in Lünen and then in Oberhausen. He was a Fallschirmjäger in World War II and a prisoner of war in the US. When he returned in 1947, he studied directing at the Folkwang Hochschule for Music and Theater in Essen, graduating with a diploma.

He began work as assistant stage director at the Theater Essen. In 1951, he became director of the Volkshochschule (adult education), then the youngest in the Federal Republic, and held the post until 1965. In 1954, he founded the International Short Film Festival Oberhausen (Internationale Westdeutsche Kurzfilmtage) in Oberhausen, which he directed until 1970. From 1965 to 1970, he served as Kultur- und Sozialdezernent of Oberhausen, responsible for culture and social politics. During this time, he was lecturer at the Ruhr University in Bochum from 1967 to 1970. From 1970 to 1990, he was a city councillor (Stadtrat) in the government of Frankfurt, as Dezernent für Kultur und Freizeit, responsible for culture and leisure. He initiated the promotion of free groups in urban culture, street theatre and 30 libraries in suburbs. He founded the Museumsufer, a series of 15 new museums along the Main River, with the traditional Städel Museum as the centre. He is credited with making Frankfurt a city of culture, not only commerce, initiating the Jewish Museum Frankfurt as the first independent Jewish museum in postwar Germany, the German Architecture Museum, and its first municipal cinema (Kommunales Kino). The Museum Angewandte Kunst (applied art) was designed by Richard Meier, including the Villa Metzler from 1803 and its park. The Washington Post quoted Hoffmann in 1985: "We are not just building museums, but a whole program." Hoffmann supported the Mousonturm as a venue for alternative culture, and the restoration of the ruined opera house as the concert hall and congress centre Alte Oper. During his tenure, the opera house became in the "Gielen era" one of the leading houses in Germany, focused on Regietheater.

From 1993 to 2001, he was also president of the Goethe-Institut, in a period of needed expansion in Eastern Europe and reduced funding. He taught film theory and cultural politics at the universities of Bochum, Marburg and Frankfurt, and as a visiting professor in Jerusalem and Tel Aviv.

He died in Frankfurt on 1 June 2018.

== Legacy ==
When he retired from the post as president of the Goethe-Institut in 2002, Bundespräsident Johannes Rau said "Der Mann streitet glaubwürdig – und ein begnadeter Bettler ist er auch" (The man argues believably, and is also a gifted beggar"). After his death, Germany's minister of culture, Monika Grütters said that Germany lost one of its most formative and successful cultural politicians ("einen ihrer prägendsten und erfolgreichsten Kulturpolitiker") who had the great talent to inspire people across party barriers ("Menschen zu begeistern auch über alle Parteigrenzen hinweg"). Hoffmann's successor in Frankfurt, Ina Hartwig, said that he was known beyond Frankfurt for his demand for a broad cultural participation and the founding of the Museumsufer ("... mit seiner Forderung nach einer breiten kulturellen Teilhabe und der Gründung des Frankfurter Museumsufers", and continued that he was one of the most important cultural politicians not only of Frankfurt but of the Federal Republic ("Mit Hilmar Hoffmann verlieren wir einen der bedeutendsten Kulturpolitiker nicht nur Frankfurts, sondern der gesamten Bundesrepublik").

== Awards ==
- 1976 – Filmband in Gold for long and outstanding achievements in German film
- 1988 – Helmut-Käutner-Preis
- 1988 – Friedrich-Stoltze-Preis
- 1990 – Großes Bundesverdienstkreuz with star
- 1997 – Honorary Doctorate of the Otto-Friedrich-Universität Bamberg
- 2002 – Das Glas der Vernunft
- 2003 – Waldemar von Knöringen Prize of the Georg-von-Vollmar-Akademie
- 2007 – Verdienstorden des Landes Nordrhein-Westfalen
- 2012 – Hessischer Kulturpreis

== Publications ==
During his time in Frankfurt, Hoffman published a book summarizing his creed and program for the future, Kultur für alle. He wrote Die großen Frankfurter / Ehrenwürdige Bürger und Ehrenbürger, portraying 27 honorary citizens of Frankfurt, and those who deserve to be honoured. Its fourth edition added Walter Wallmann, mayor of Frankfurt and honorary citizen of 2009, who was for many years a supporter of Hoffmann's visions such as the Museumsufer. His publications are held by the German National Library, including:

- Kultur für alle. Perspektiven und Modelle. Frankfurt am Main 1979
- Das Taubenbuch. Frankfurt am Main 1982
- „Und die Fahne führt uns in die Ewigkeit – Propaganda im NS-Film“. Fischer-Taschenbuch-Verlag, Frankfurt a. M. 1988, ISBN 3-596-24404-8.
- Warten auf die Barbaren. Frankfurt am Main 1989
- Kultur als Lebensform. Frankfurt am Main 1990
- Mythos Olympia. Das Werk Leni Riefenstahls. Berlin 1993.
- Erinnerungen. Suhrkamp, Neufassung, Frankfurt 2003, ISBN 978-3-518-39784-8.
- Die großen Frankfurter. Frankfurt am Main 2004.
- Lebensprinzip Kultur. Schriften und Aufsätze. Frankfurt am Main 2006, ISBN 978-3-7973-0963-1.
- Frankfurts starke Frauen. Frankfurt am Main 2006.
- Das Frankfurter Museumsufer. Frankfurt am Main 2009, ISBN 978-3-7973-1128-3.
- Frankfurts Meisterwerke. Die Lieblingsbilder der Frankfurter (2010)
- Frankfurts Oberbürgermeister 1945–1995. Ein Beitrag zur Kulturgeschichte der Stadt. Societäts-Verlag, Frankfurt am Main 2012, ISBN 978-3-942921-66-4.
- Generation Hitlerjugend. Reflexionen über eine Verführung. Axel Dielmann Verlag, Frankfurt am Main 2018, ISBN 978-3-86638-229-9.

== Literature ==
- Wolfgang Schneider (ed.): Kulturelle Bildung braucht Kulturpolitik. Hilmar Hoffmanns "Kultur für alle" reloaded. Hildesheim 2010
- "Kultur für alle". Hilmar Hoffmann zum 85. Geburtstag, in: kulturpolitische mitteilungen. Zeitschrift für Kulturpolitik der Kulturpolitischen Gesellschaft. Issue 130, III/2010, Bonn 2010.
- Anna Hepp: I would prefer not to (Ich möchte lieber nicht), Short film portrait about Hilmar Hoffmann, 2012.
- Claus-Jürgen Göpfert: Der Kulturpolitiker. Hilmar Hoffmann, Leben und Werk, Deutsches Filminstitut, Frankfurt am Main 2015, ISBN 978-3-88799-088-6.
