= Museum Giersch =

Museum in Germany

Coordinates: 50°06′05″N 8°40′14″E

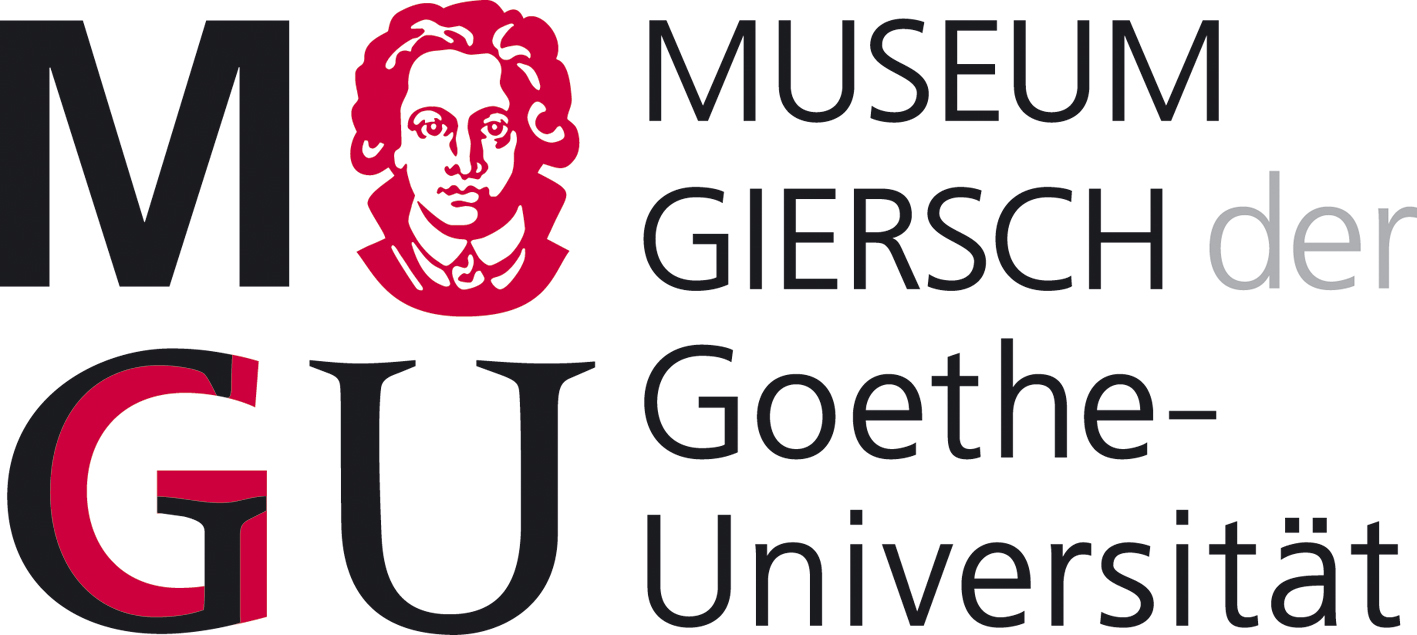

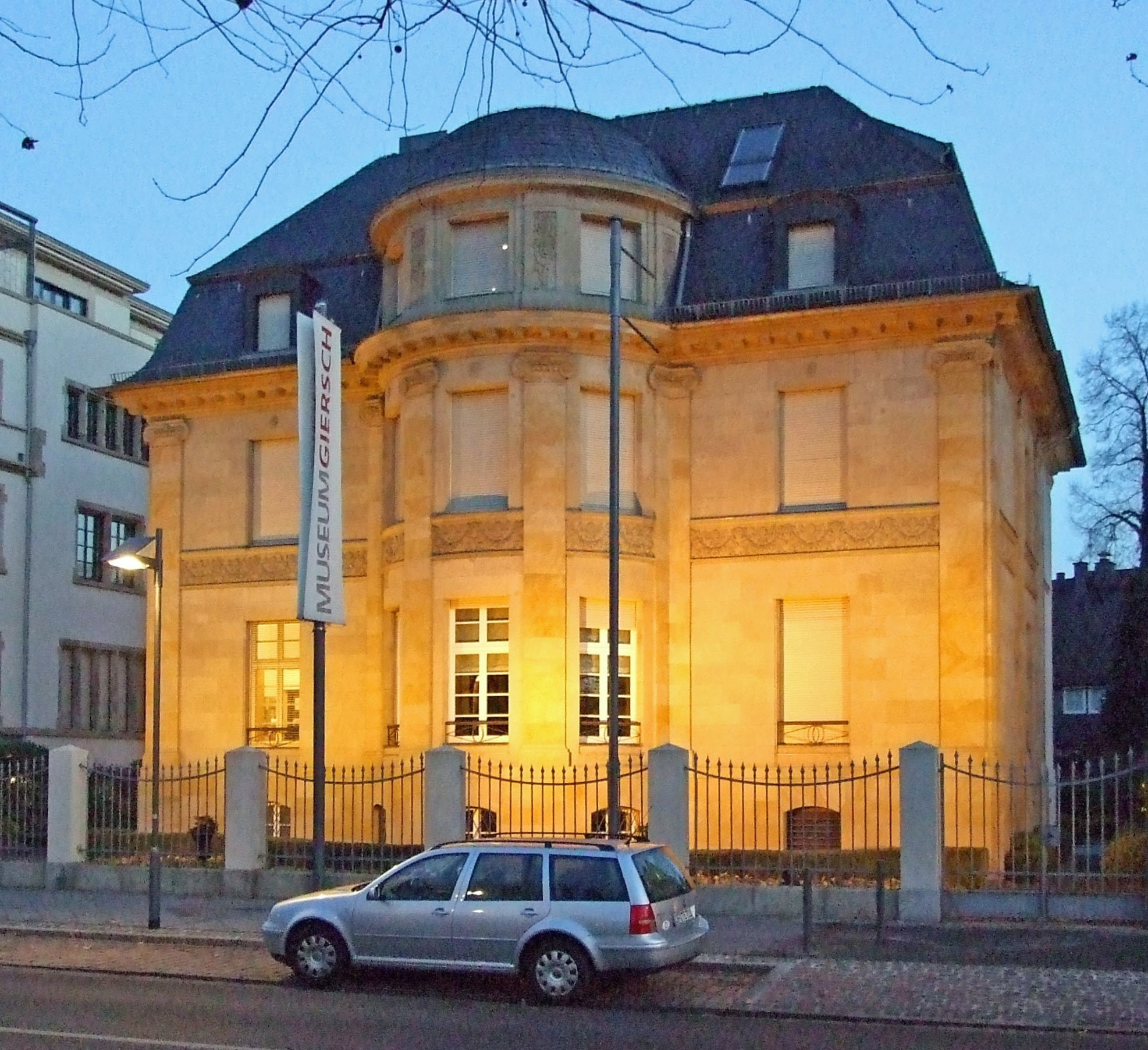
- Established: 2000
- Location: Schaumainkai 83, Museumsufer, Frankfurt, Germany
- Type: Art museum
- Collections: Art and cultural history of the Rhine-Main area
- Public transit access: Schweizer Platz; 15, 16 Otto-Hahn-Platz; 16, 17, 21 Stresemannallee / Gartenstraße
- Website: www.mggu.de

The Museum Giersch is an art gallery on the Main River in Frankfurt am Main, Germany, in the Museumsufer area.

The museum opened in 2000. It hosts a changing series of exhibitions displaying the art and cultural history of the Rhine-Main area, with the aim of promoting the region's cultural identity. The Museum Giersch displays works on loan from public and private collections. The range of exhibits covers all areas of painting, photography, sculpture and graphic art, as well as architecture and applied art.

The gallery is situated in a neoclassical villa on the Schaumainkai, built around 1910 for the Philipp Holzmann company and now one of the few surviving riverside villas in Sachsenhausen. The renovation of the villa and its conversion into an exhibition venue were carried out by the Giersch Foundation (Stiftung Giersch), which was founded in 1994 and is the museum's sole operator.

== See also ==
- List of museums in Germany
