= Museumsufer =

Locality of a group of museums in Frankfurt am Main

Coordinates: 50°06′22″N 8°40′43″E

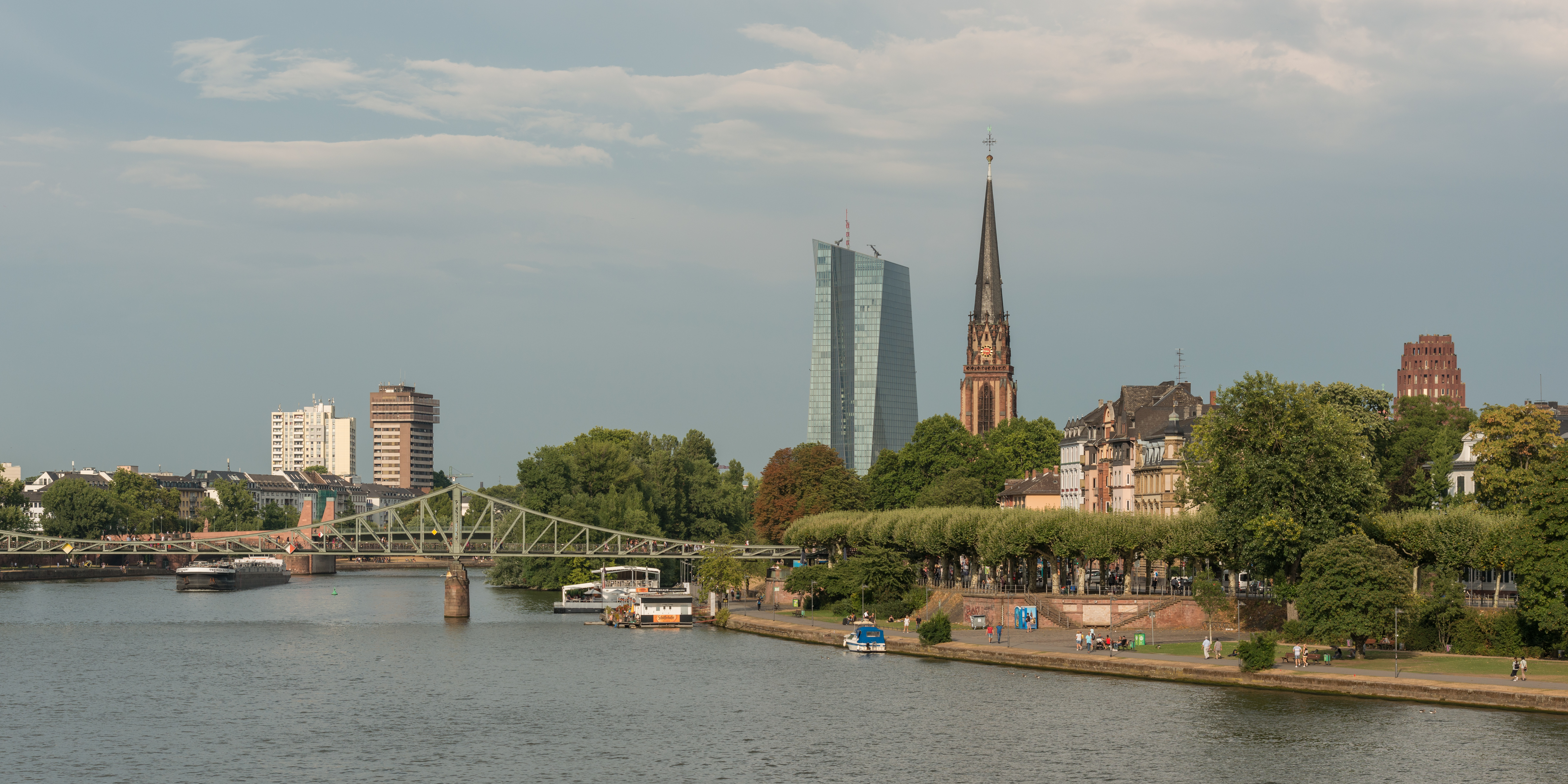
Museumsufer Frankfurt, Aerial

Museumsufer Frankfurt
Museums of the Museumsufer, Frankfurt am Main
South Bank
1 Hindemith Kabinett im Kuhhirtenturm (de)
2 Icon Museum (de) (Museum of Orthodox sacred Art)
3 Portikus (Exhibition hall for contemporary art)
4 Museum Angewandte Kunst (Applied Arts)
5 Museum der Weltkulturen (Ethnological Museum)
6 Deutsches Filmmuseum (de) (German Film Museum)
7 Deutsches Architekturmuseum
8 Museum für Kommunikation
9 Städel (Fine Arts Museum)
10 Liebieghaus (Classical sculpture collection)
11 Museum Giersch (Art and culture of Rhine-Main)
North Bank
12 Jewish Museum Frankfurt
13 Frankfurt Archaeological Museum (de)
14 Historical Museum, Frankfurt
15 Caricatura Museum Frankfurt
16 Schirn Kunsthalle Frankfurt (Art exhibition venue)
17 Museum für Moderne Kunst (Modern Art Museum)
18 Frankfurter Judengasse Museum (Preserved foundations from the Ghetto)
19 Deutsches Romantik-Museum / Goethe House
External
20 Naturmuseum Senckenberg (Westend, Frankfurt)
21 Eintracht Frankfurt Museum (Waldstadion)
22 German Leather Museum (Offenbach)
23 Klingspor Museum (Offenbach)

Museumsufer (Museum Embankment) is the name of a landscape of museums in Frankfurt, Hesse, Germany, lined up on both banks of the river Main or in close vicinity. The centre is the art museum Städel. The other museums were added, partly by transforming historic villas, partly by building new museums, in the 1980s by cultural politician Hilmar Hoffmann. The exhibition hall Portikus was opened on an island at the Alte Brücke in 2006.

As of 2022, 39 museums belong to the Museumsufer.

== History ==
The idea for a group of different museums in Frankfurt was proposed in 1977 by Hilmar Hoffmann, who was then as Kulturdezernent responsible for culture in the city. Before, architect Till Behrens had proposed a concept Frankfurter Grüngürtel to the forum for development (Frankfurter Forum für Stadtentwicklung). Between 1980 and 1990, existing museums were expanded and many new ones built, often including historic villas. Architects included internationally known Richard Meier, Oswald Mathias Ungers, Josef Paul Kleihues, Günter Behnisch and Hans Hollein.

Beginning in 2008, Frankfurt has restored and expanded some of its museums. The Städel was expanded by an annex, and the Film Museum was renovated.

== South bank ==
- Kuhhirtenturm, (Hindemith Kabinett)
- Icon Museum, housing one of the largest collections of Russian, Bulgarian, Greek and other icons in Germany
- Museum Angewandte Kunst (Museum Applied Arts), housing furniture and design from the 10th to 21st century with a notable collection of East Asian applied arts
- Museum der Weltkulturen (Ethnological Museum), displaying a small part of an ethnological collection in changing exhibitions.
- Deutsches Filmmuseum (German Film Museum), explaining the development of movie-making from the beginnings in the 19th century up until today, includes an art house cinema
- Deutsches Architekturmuseum (German Architecture Museum), apart from a small permanent collection, changing exhibitions showcase current architectural projects and trends from around the globe.
- Museum für Kommunikation (Communication Museum). The large permanent collection displays various relics from the postal and telephone services, including one of the world's largest stamp collections and a collection of communication related art; temporary exhibitions focus more on the abstract phenomenon of communication.
- Städel, one of Germany's prominent fine art museums with a focus on old masters and classical modern art
- Liebieghaus, a sculpture collection, focusing mainly on sculpture from ancient Greece until the renaissance days
- Museum Giersch, showcasing a small permanent collection of local 19th-century artists and houses temporary exhibition on artists that have a (loose) connection to the Frankfurt region
- Portikus, a small free exhibition space showing temporary exhibitions of contemporary art
- Eintracht Frankfurt Museum (Waldstadion)

Museums located in Offenbach am Main:

- German Leather Museum
- Klingspor Museum, book and letter art

== Gallery South bank ==
Hindemith Kabinett im Kuhhirtenturm

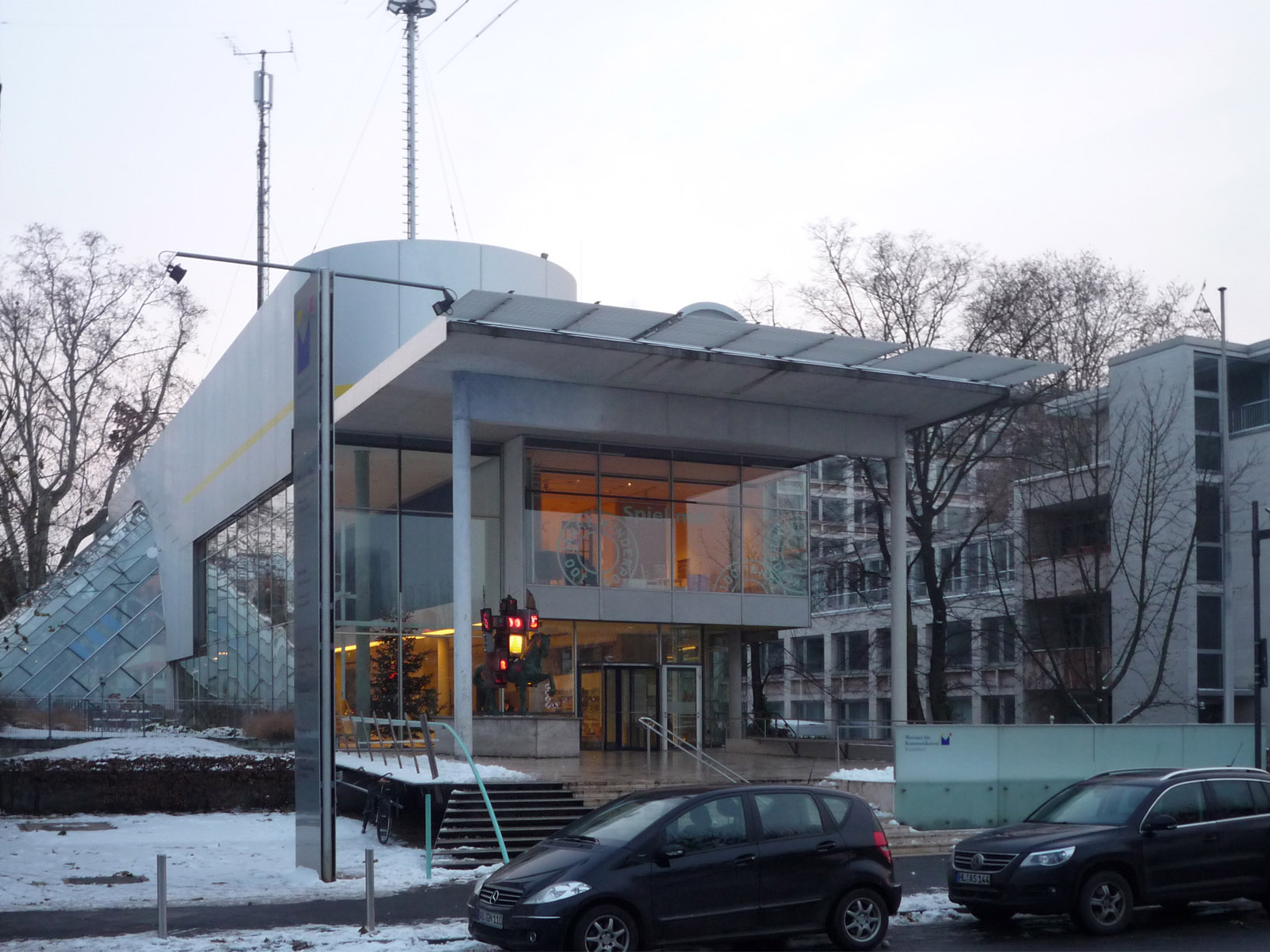
Museum of Communication Frankfurt

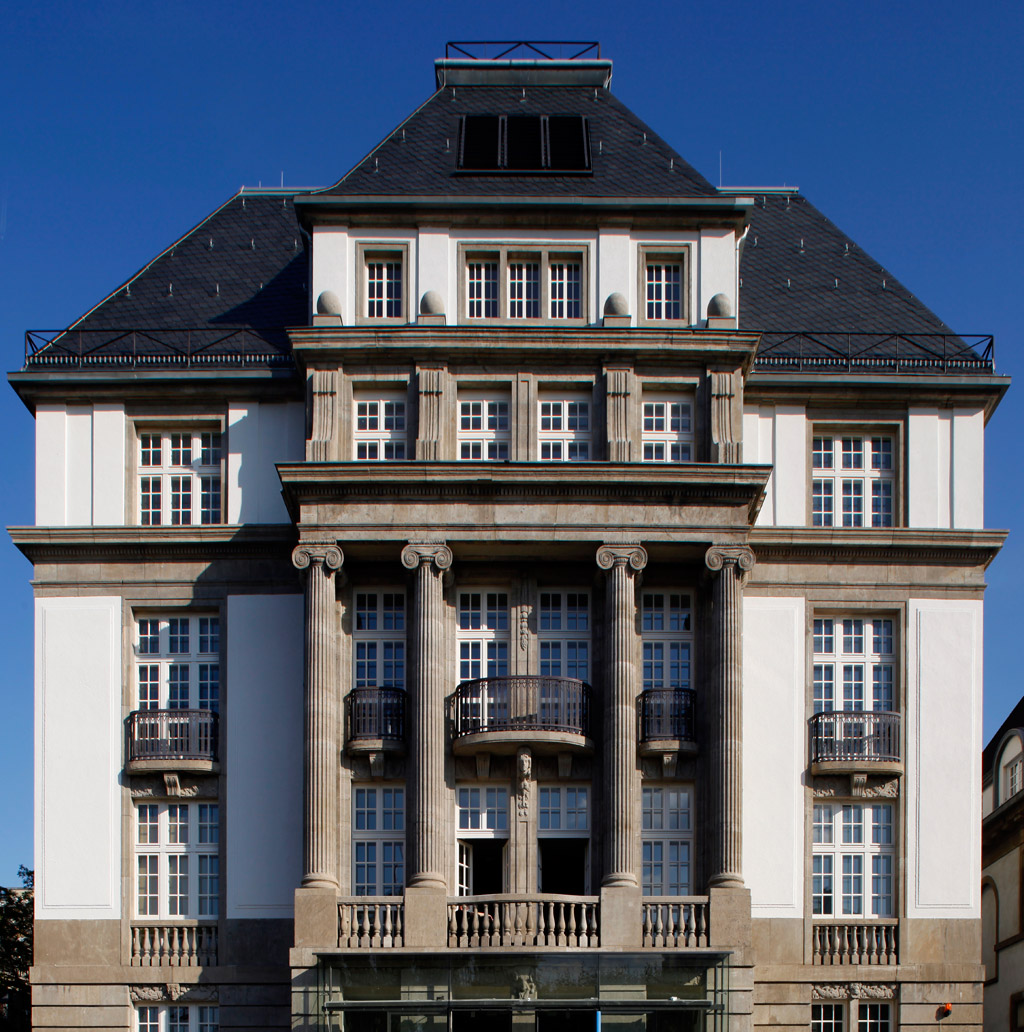
German Film Museum

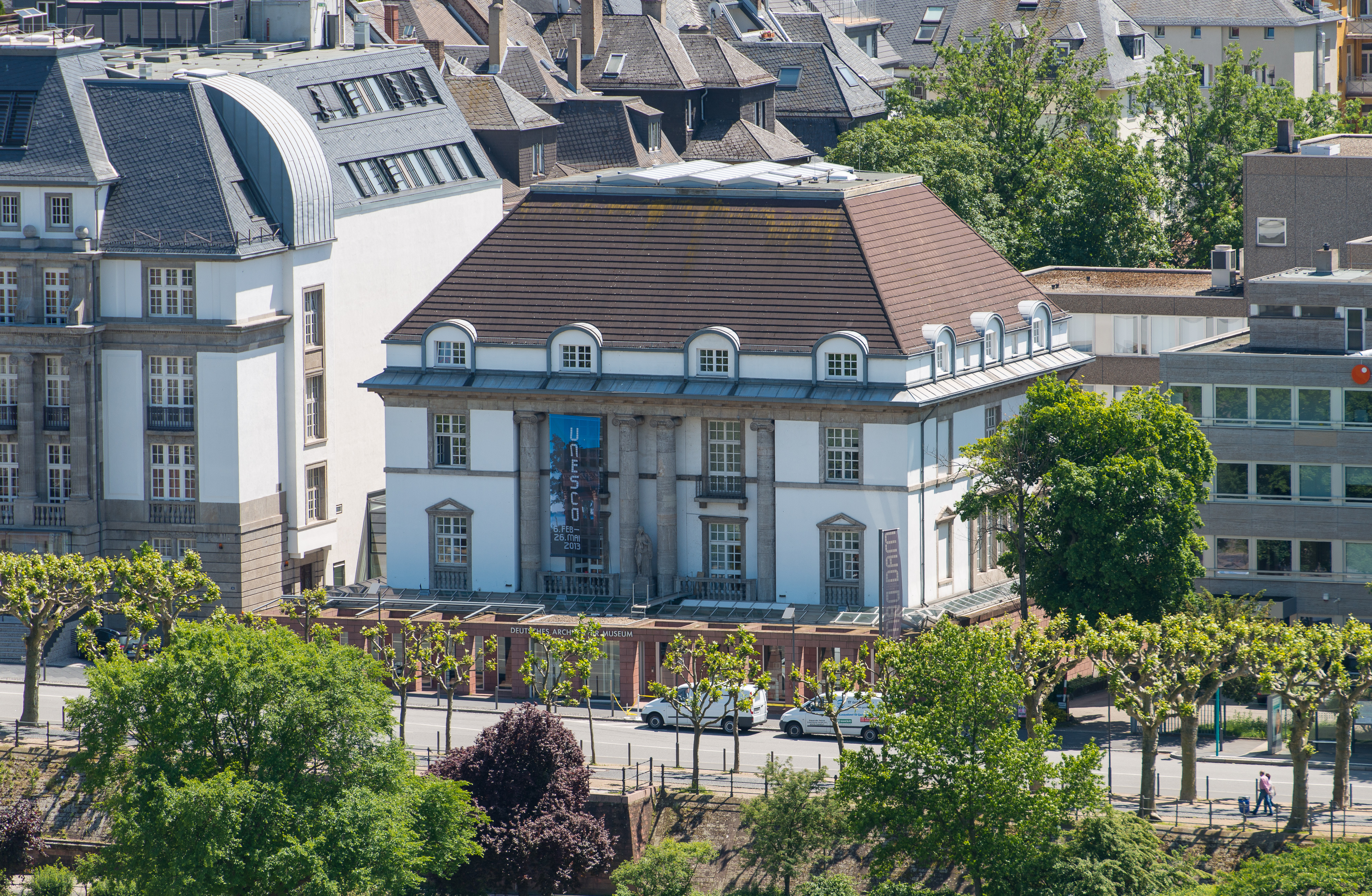
Deutsches Architekturmuseum

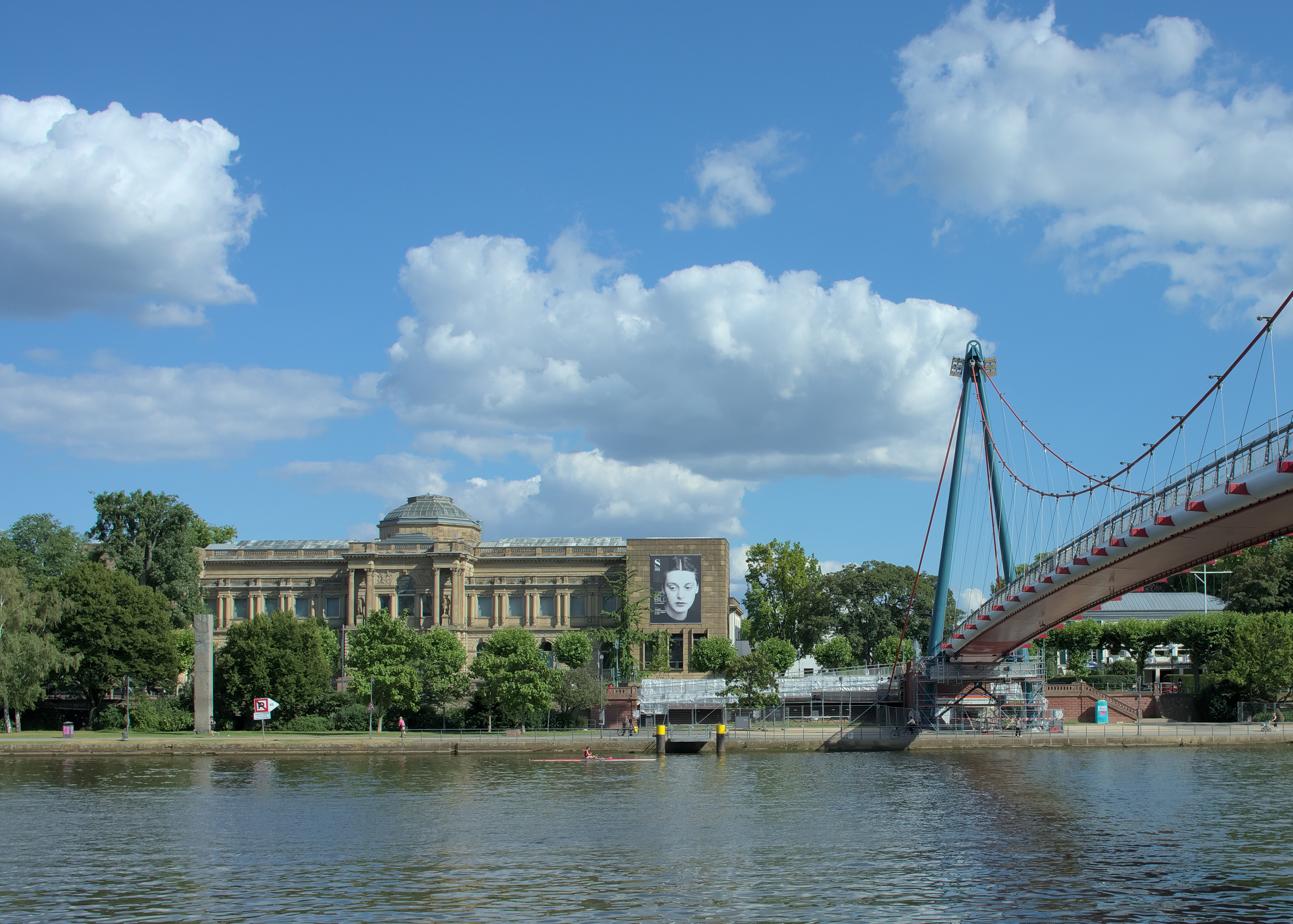
Städel

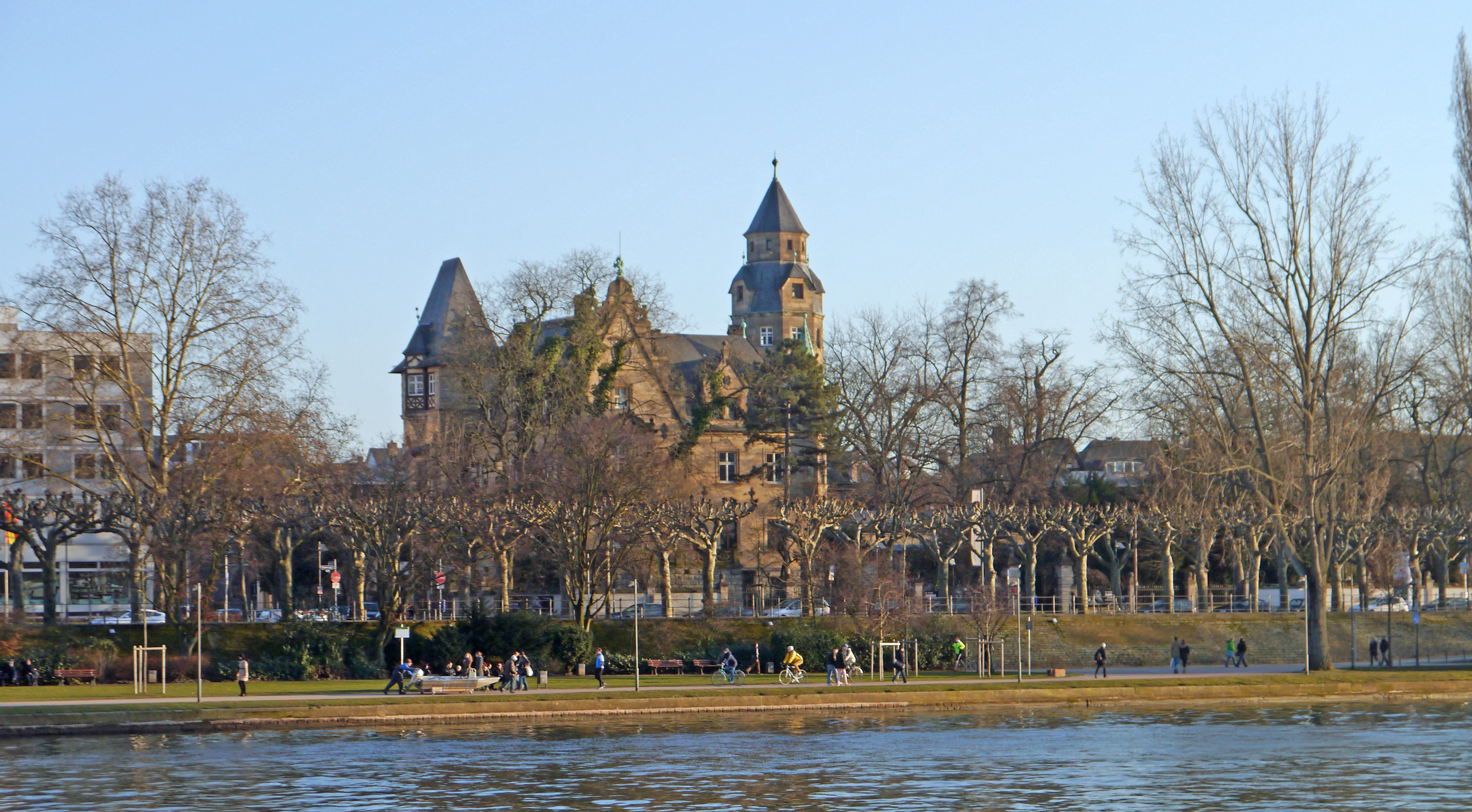
Liebieghaus

== North bank ==
- Jewish Museum Frankfurt. The permanent collection gives an overview of the varied fate of Frankfurt's Jewish community through the centuries. Temporary exhibitions focus on contemporary Jewish life and art.
- Historical Museum, displaying artefacts off the city's history from Roman times until today, some very prominent old master paintings and sculptures and various temporary exhibitions
- Caricatura Museum, comic art

Museums located in the Old Town but not right on the river bank:

- Schirn
- Museum für Moderne Kunst
- Part of the Jewish museum in the Frankfurter Judengasse
- Archeological Museum Frankfurt in the Karmeliterkloster
- Deutsches Romantik-Museum / Goethe House

Museums located in Westend, Frankfurt:

- Naturmuseum Senckenberg

== Gallery North bank ==
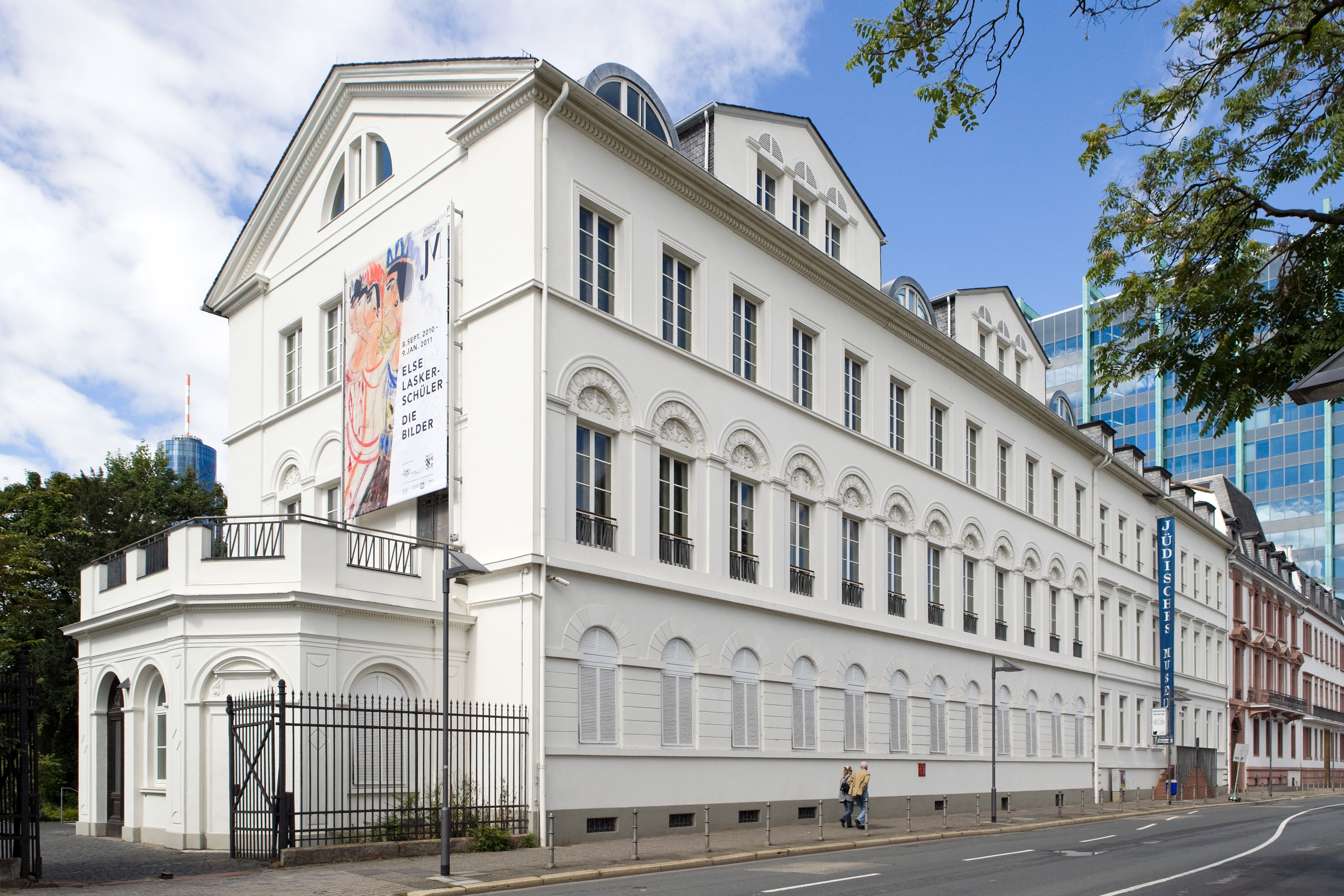
Jewish

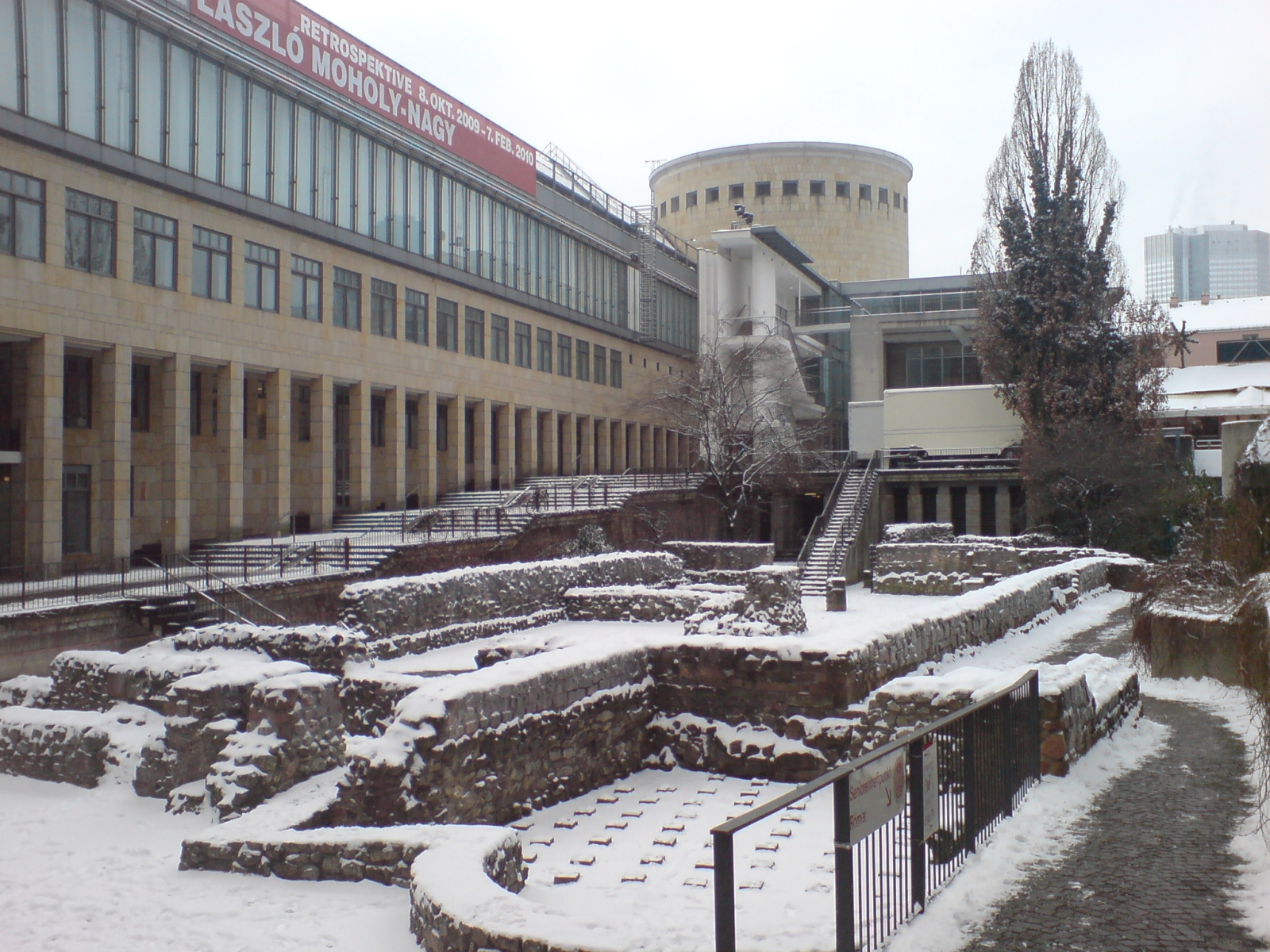
Schirn

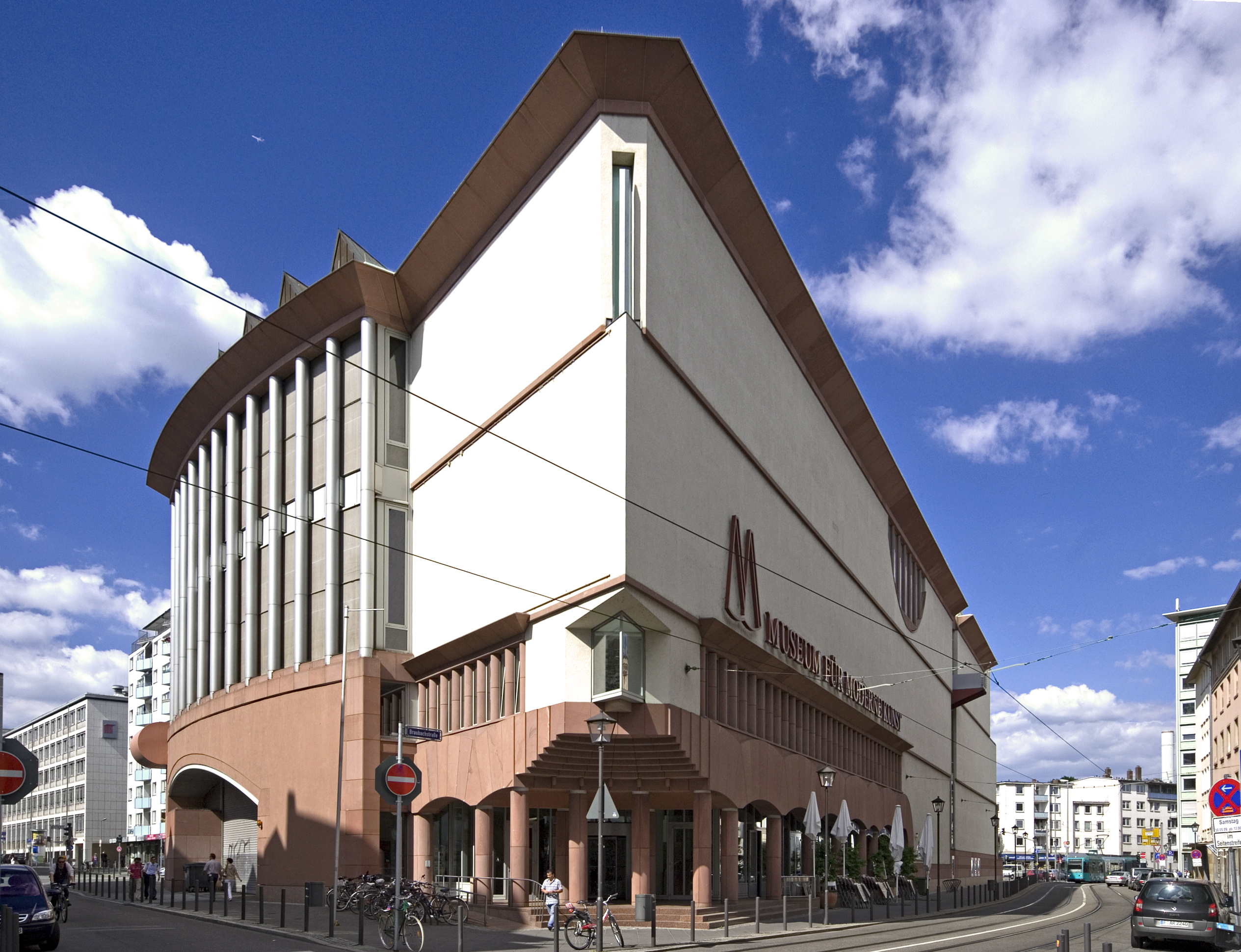
Modern Art

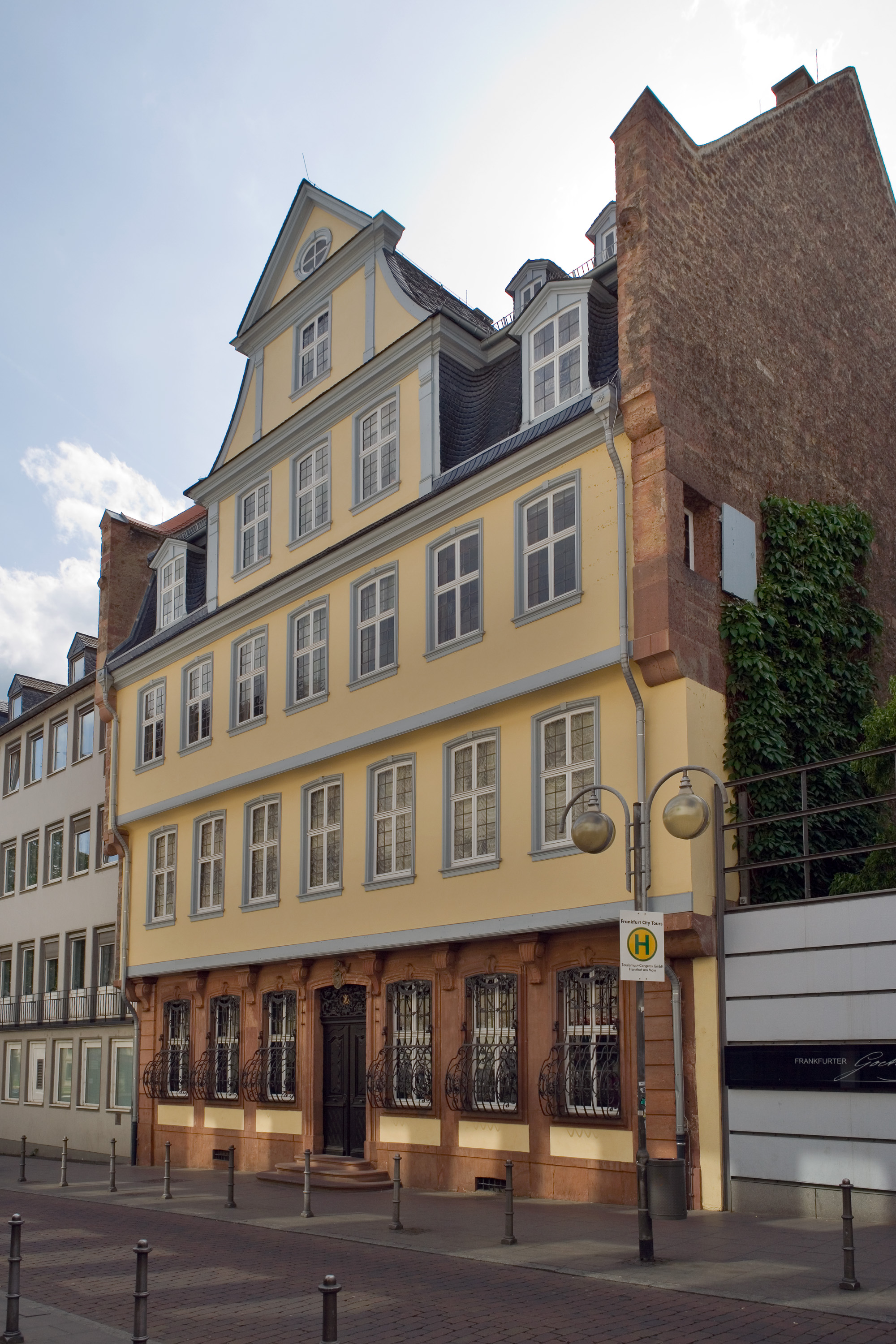
Goethe House

== Events ==
The street on the south is called Schaumainkai and is often partially closed to traffic for Frankfurt's largest flea market each Saturday. Two festivals focus on the Museumsufer, the "Nacht der Museen" (Night of the Museums) when several museums open at night, and the Museumsuferfest (Museumsufer Festival) in August.

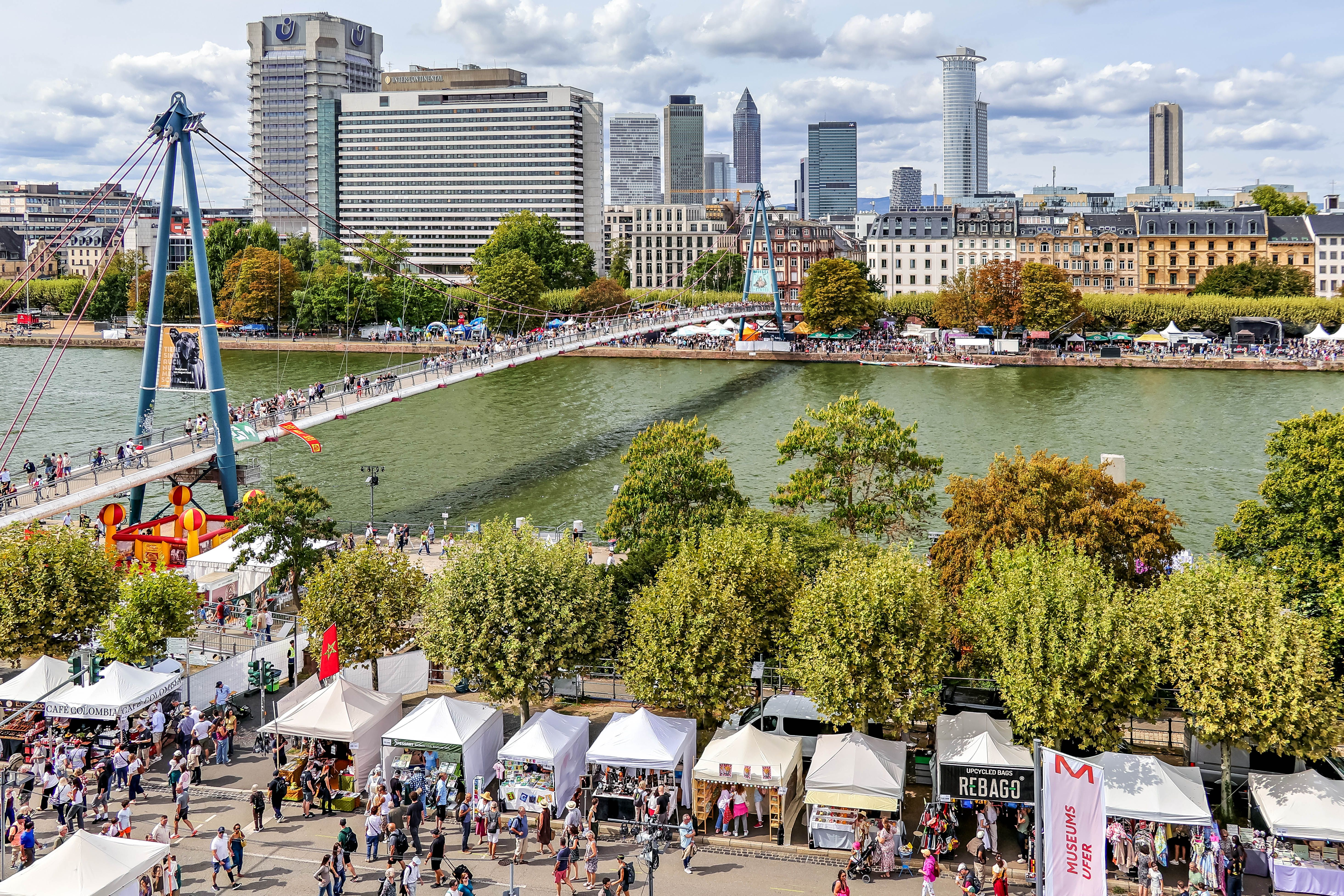
Museum Embankment Festival (Museumsuferfest)

Museum Embankment Festival (Museumsuferfest)

flea market on the Museum Embankment

== Tickets ==
- MuseumsuferTicket (2 days)
- MuseumsuferCard (1 year)

== Panorama ==
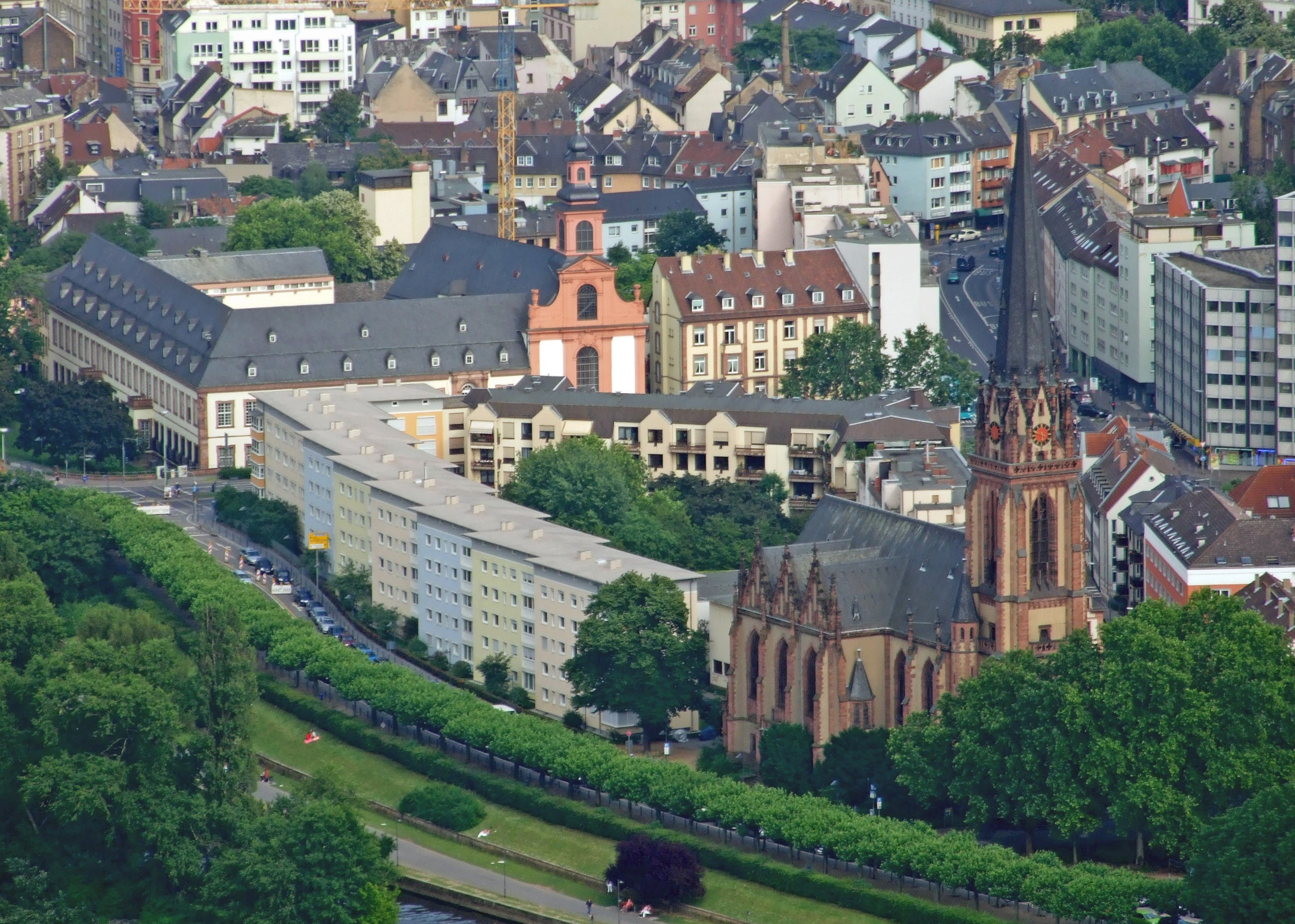
First part at Brückenstraße

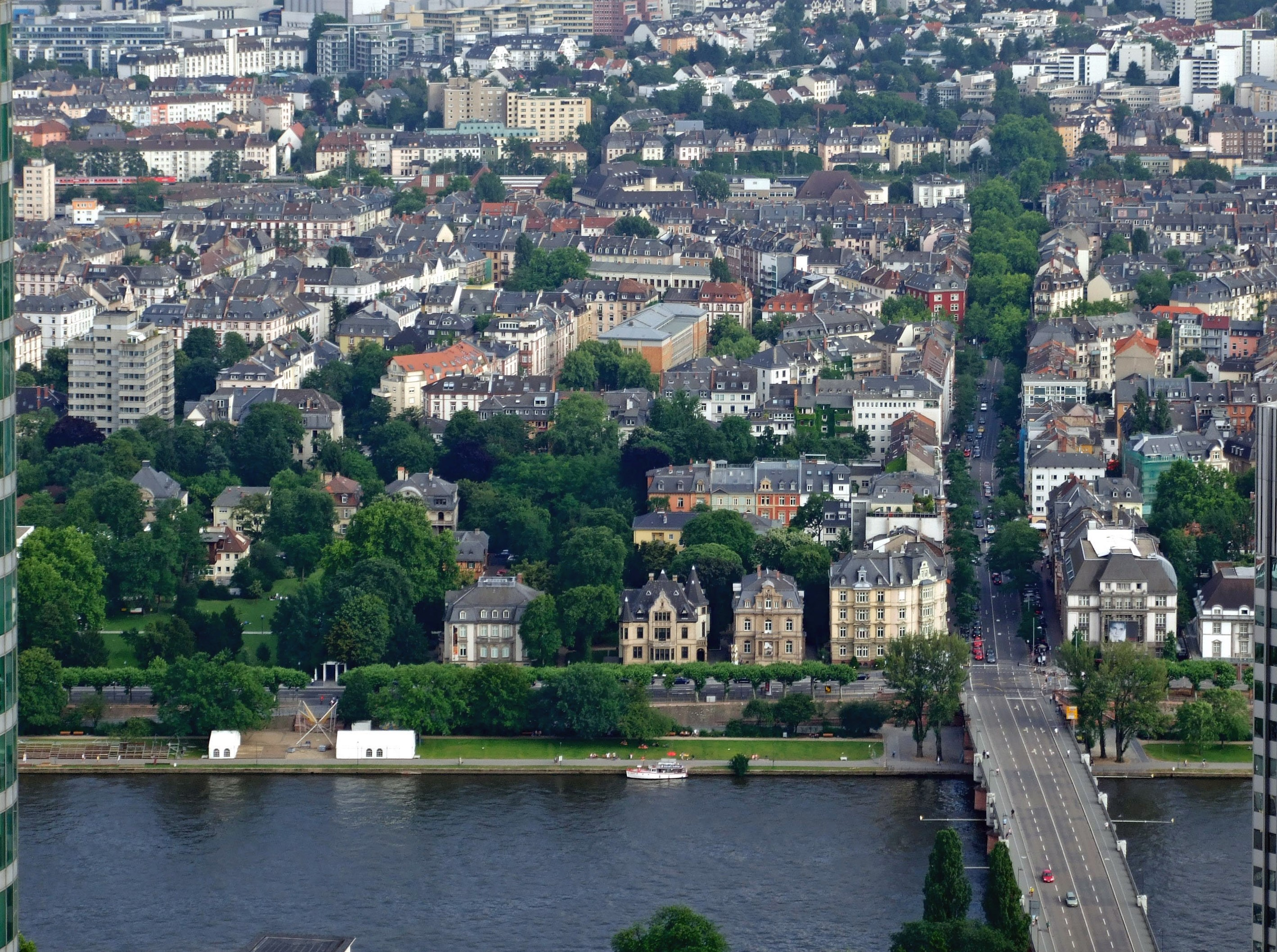
Second (middle) section, left and right from Schweizer Straße

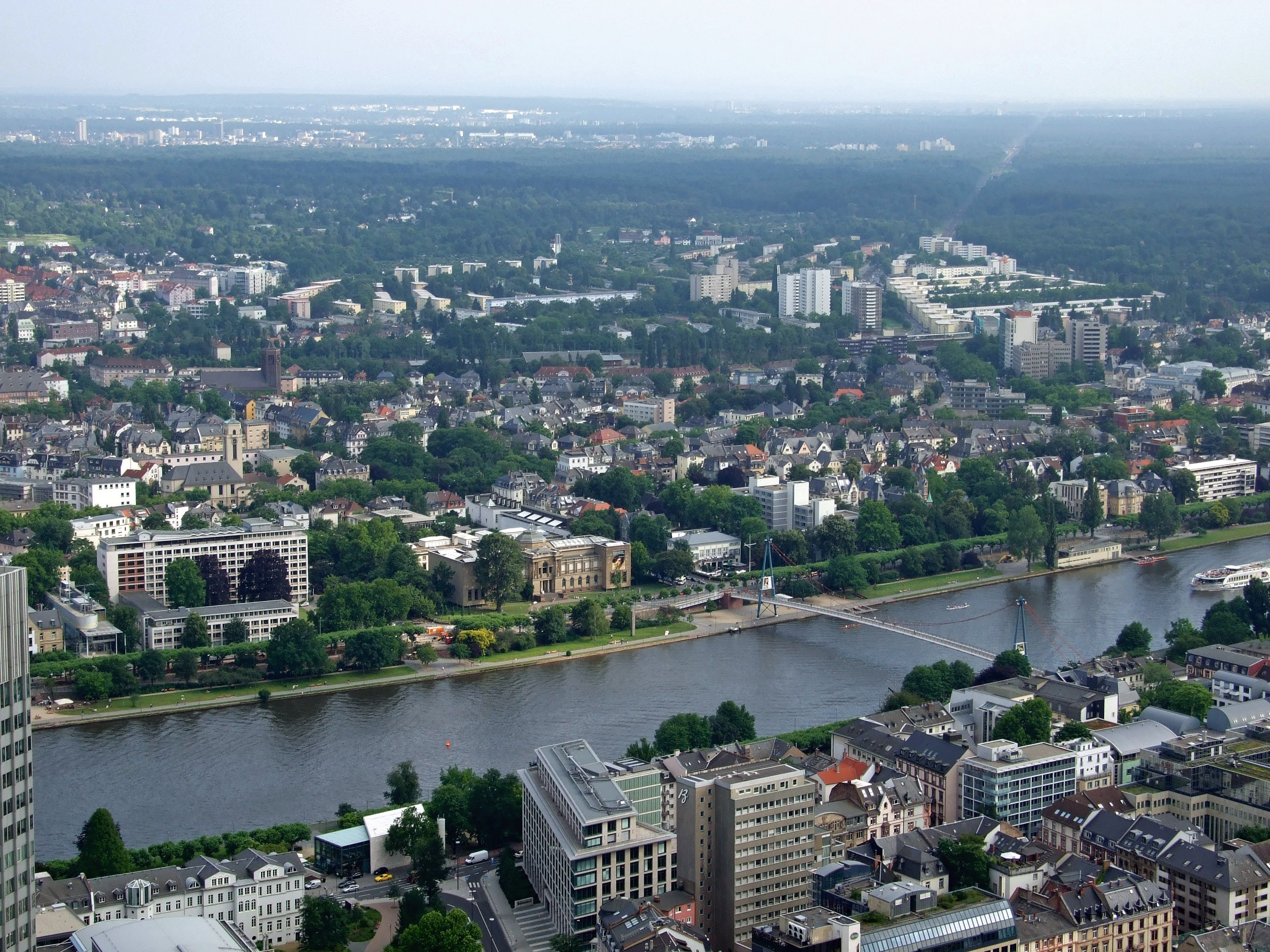
Last part, until Museum Giersch

== See also ==
- Schaumainkai
- Sachsenhausen (Frankfurt am Main)
- Altstadt (Frankfurt am Main)
