= Georg Heuberger =

German jurist

Georg Heuberger (1946 – 7 November 2010) was founding director of the Jewish Museum Frankfurt and representative of the Claims Conference.

== Biography ==
He was born in Budapest, Hungary. Both his parents, Dolek and Franziska, escaped from the Bochnia ghetto in 1943 and fled to Budapest, Hungary via Slovakia, where they survived The Holocaust. After the Holocaust, the family came to Frankfurt via Prague in 1948. In his early years, Heuberger studied Jewish history at the Hebrew University of Jerusalem. From 1982 to 1985 he was the rector's assistant at the department of Jewish Studies at the University of Heidelberg. In 1988 he became the founding director of the Jewish Museum Frankfurt and, until his retirement in January 2006, he took over the editing of the exhibition catalogs. As a museum director, he was also the managing director of the Commission for Research into the History of Frankfurt's Jews. Nearing the end of his life, Heuberger became a representative of the Claims Conference, and played an active role in the restitution of art and cultural goods that were stolen from the Jewish community of Budapest. In 2006, Heuberger was awarded the Federal Cross of Merit.
