= Portikus =

Contemporary art exhibition hall

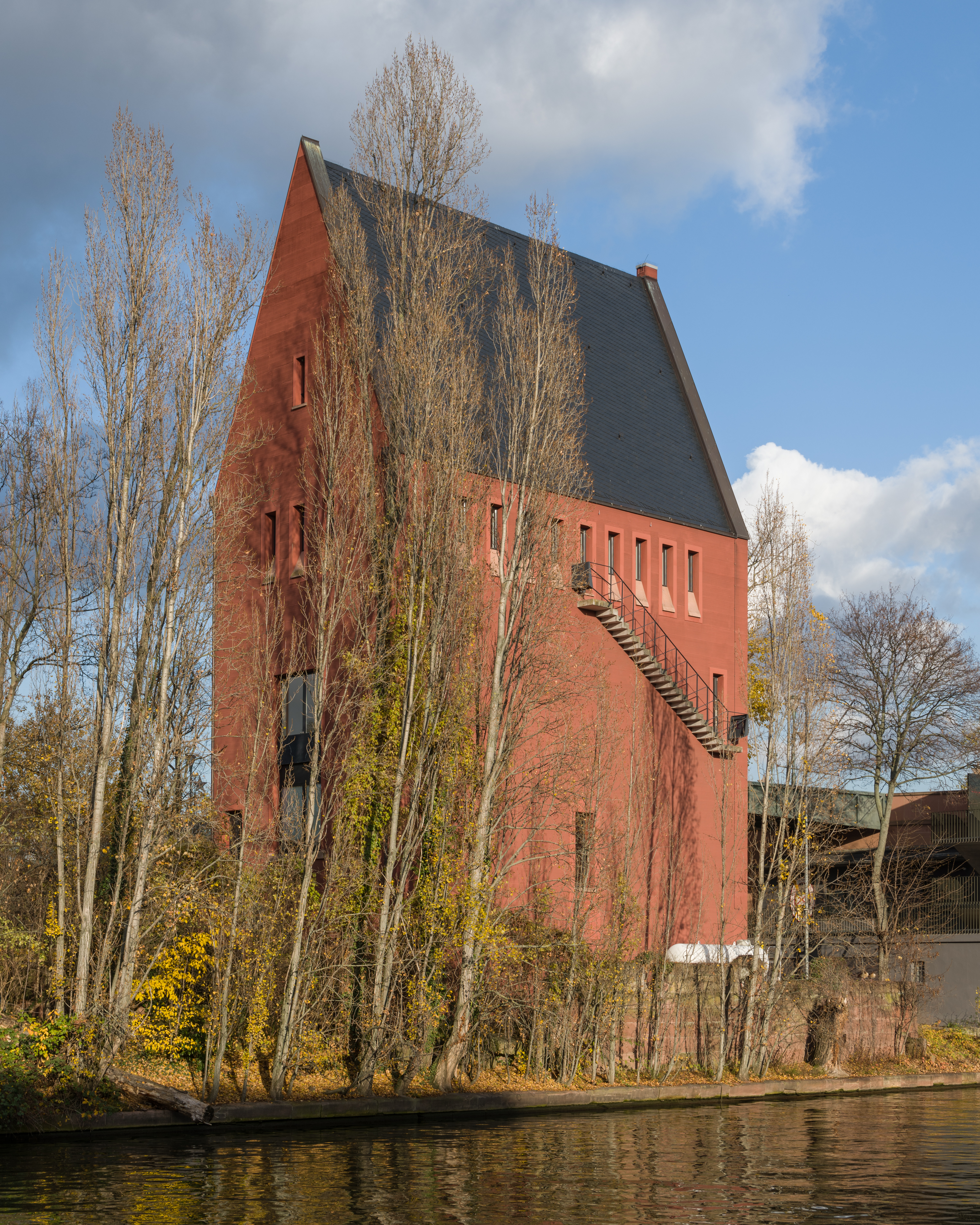
- Portikus, located on a small island in the river Main, south front
- Established: 1987/2006
- Location: Museumsufer, Frankfurt, Germany
- Coordinates: 50°06′29″N 8°41′15″E
- Type: Museum

Portikus is an exhibition hall for contemporary art in Frankfurt am Main, that was founded in 1987 by Kasper König. The museum is part of Frankfurt's Museumsufer (Museum Riverbank). Portikus presents the work of both internationally renowned artists and emerging artists. Almost always, artwork is commissioned for the gallery space.

== History ==
Its name is derived from the surviving portico of the Stadtbibliothek (public library) from 1825 that was destroyed during World War II. In 1987, the vestige of this classical building again fulfilled its architectural function as a facade when the Frankfurt-based architects Marie-Theres Deutsch and Klaus Dreißigacker built a simple white cube out of shipping containers.

The city government decided to rebuild the destroyed library, however, awarding the contract to local architect Christoph Mäckler. In 2003, therefore, after 16 years and more than 100 exhibitions, Portikus moved into the ground floor of the historical building known as the Leinwandhaus. This temporary location was designed with the artist Tobias Rehberger. Rehberger developed a spatial concept that, through the introduction of various modular elements such as platforms and boxes, allowed the integration of the gallery, office, reading area, and storage spaces into a large and rustic hall. In collaboration with the Zumtobel Staff, the artist Olafur Eliasson designed the lighting of the exhibition space. Until the beginning of 2006, the exhibition program operated in this space under the name "Portikus im Leinwandhaus".

In 2006, Portikus moved to a new space, designed as well by Mäckler. The new building is located on a small island in the river Main at the very center of the city, with direct access only from the Alte Brücke, or Old Bridge, Frankfurt's oldest bridge.

The relationship of Portikus to the city is defined by its association with the Städelschule, Academy of Fine Arts; this link allows an intense exchange between the exhibiting artists and the students of the art academy.

== Publications ==
- Kölle, Brigitte (1997). Portikus Frankfurt am Main, 1987–1997 (in German). Frankfurt am Main: Portikus. ISBN 978-3-928071-34-5. OCLC 38725448.
- Nollert, Angelika (2001). Daniel Hunziker, dieser Katalog erscheint anläßlich der Ausstellung Daniel Hunziker im Portikus Frankfurt am Main, 9. Dezember 2000 bis 21. Januar 2001 (in German). Frankfurt am Main: Portikus. ISBN 3-928071-51-3. OCLC 76230952.
