= Historical Museum, Frankfurt =

Historical Museum
- Historisches Museum

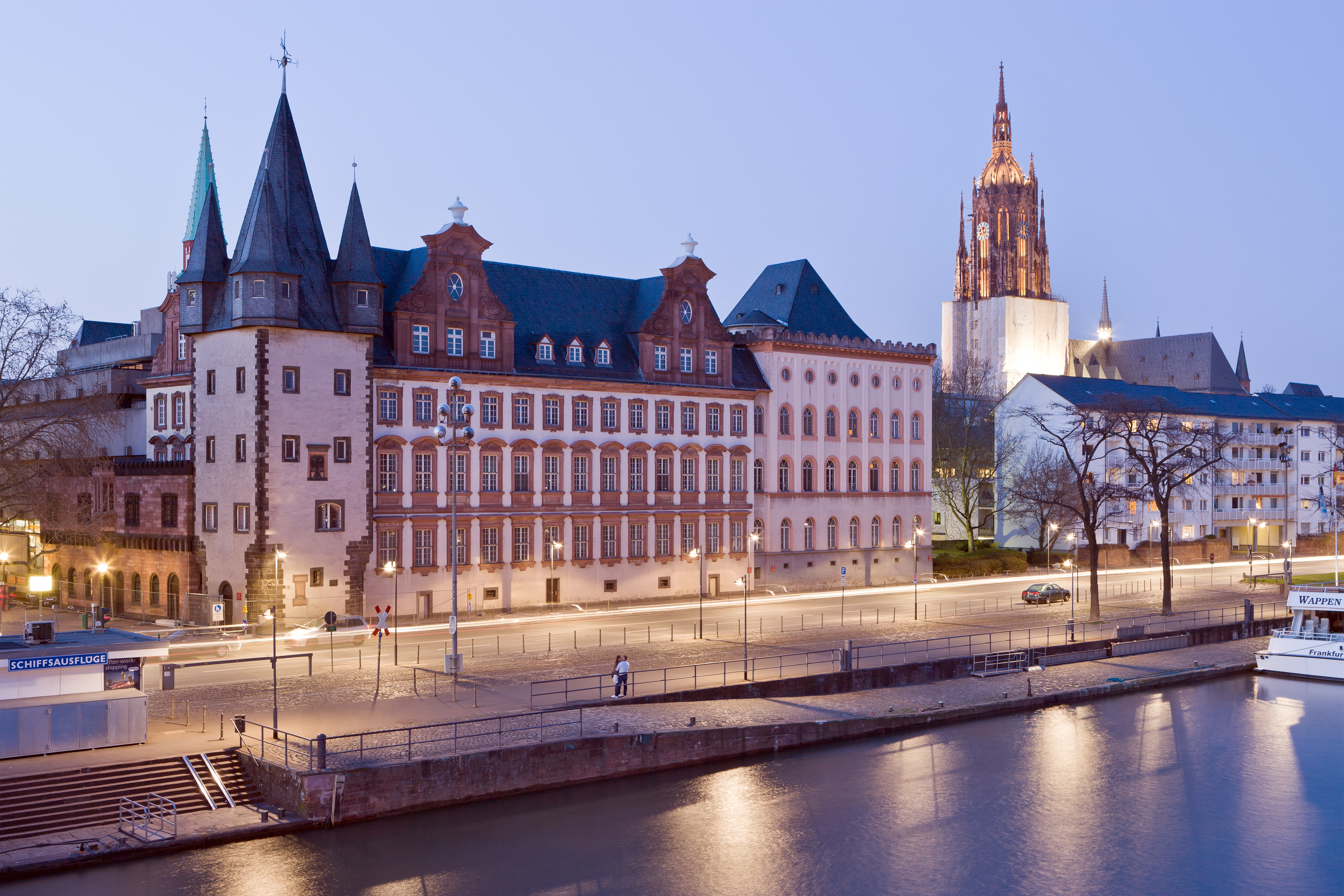
- View from the iron footbrigde over the Main (river), 2009
- Established: 1878
- Location: Museumsufer, Frankfurt, Germany
- Coordinates: 50°06′35″N 8°40′57″E
- Type: Museum
- Collections: History of Frankfurt
- Website: www.historisches-museum-frankfurt.de

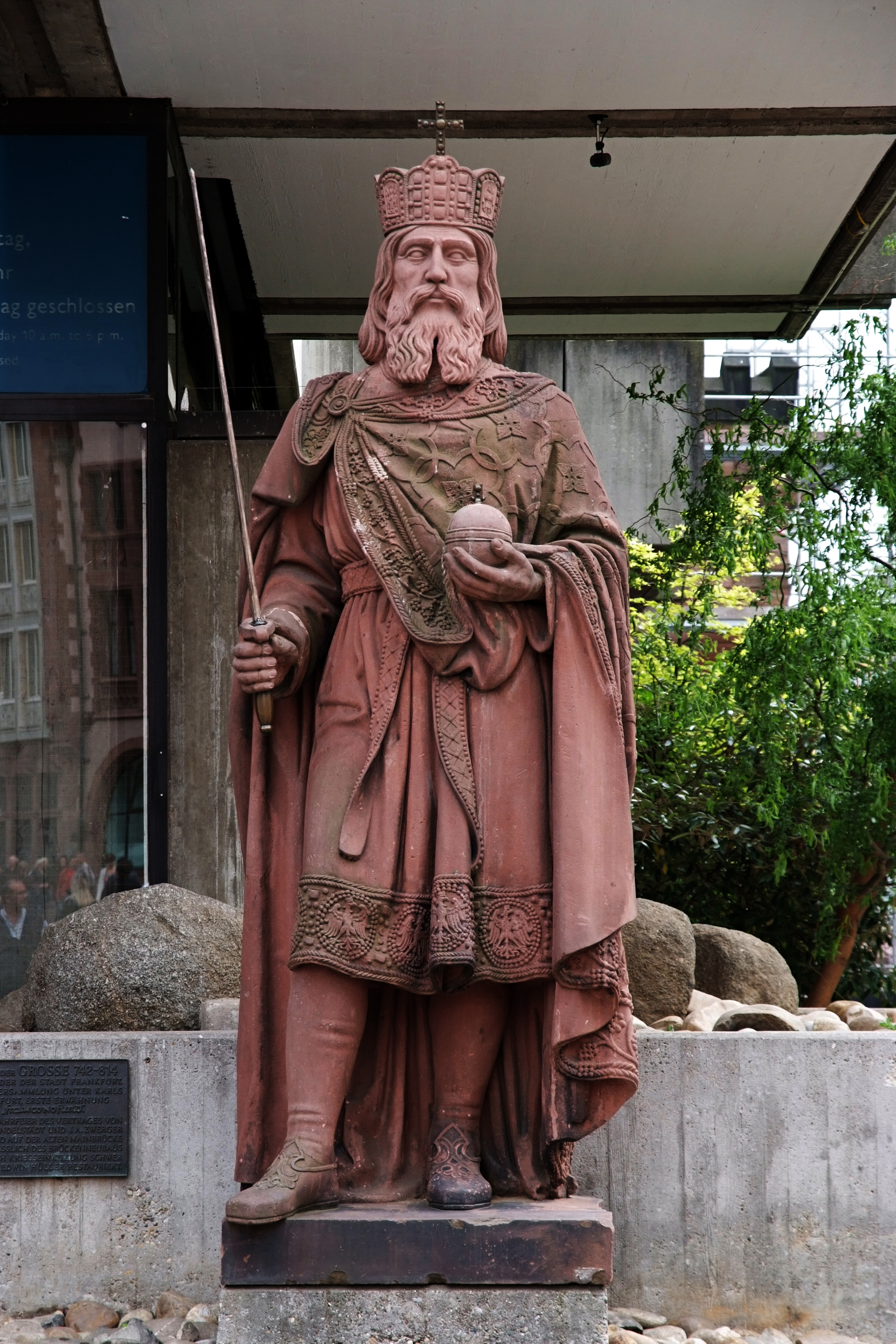
The portrait of Charlemagne in front of the Historisches Museum

The Historical Museum (German: Historisches Museum) in Frankfurt am Main, Germany, was founded in 1878, and includes cultural and historical objects relating to the history of Frankfurt and Germany. It moved into the Saalhof in 1955, and a new extension was opened in 1972.

Due to reconstruction and renovation work on the old buildings (before 1971), the museum was closed until the beginning of 2012. The renovated old building was opened on 26 May 2012 and the new building on 7 October 2017.

== Collection ==
The museum's collection is displayed in several permanent chronological exhibitions: Mediaeval Frankfurt, the Late Middle Ages, the sixteenth to eighteenth centuries, the nineteenth-century city, and its history as a metropolis from 1866 to 2001. Special exhibitions are also on display.

== Artworks ==
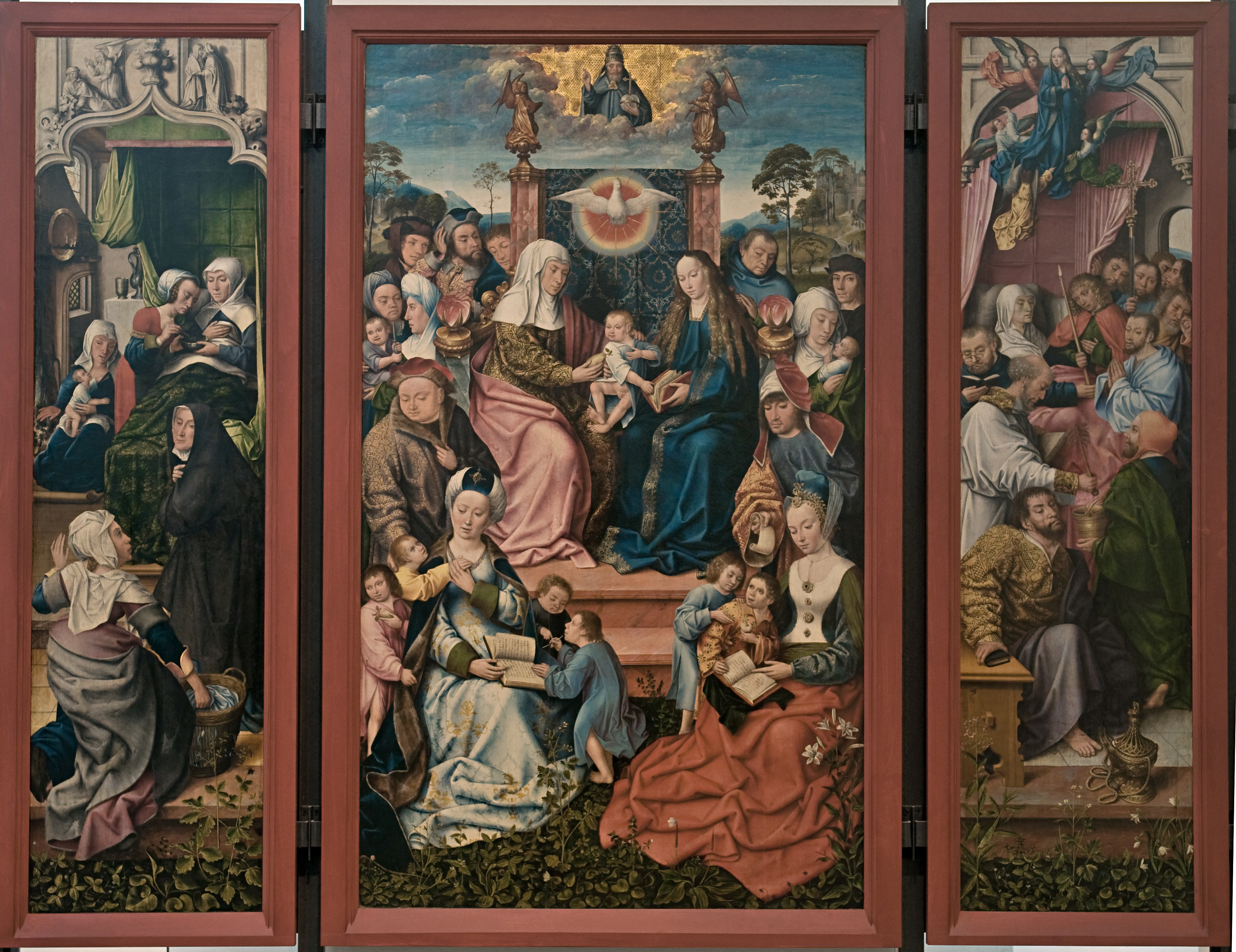
St. Anne altarpiece from the Carmelite church in Frankfurt, c.1500 by the Master of Frankfurt

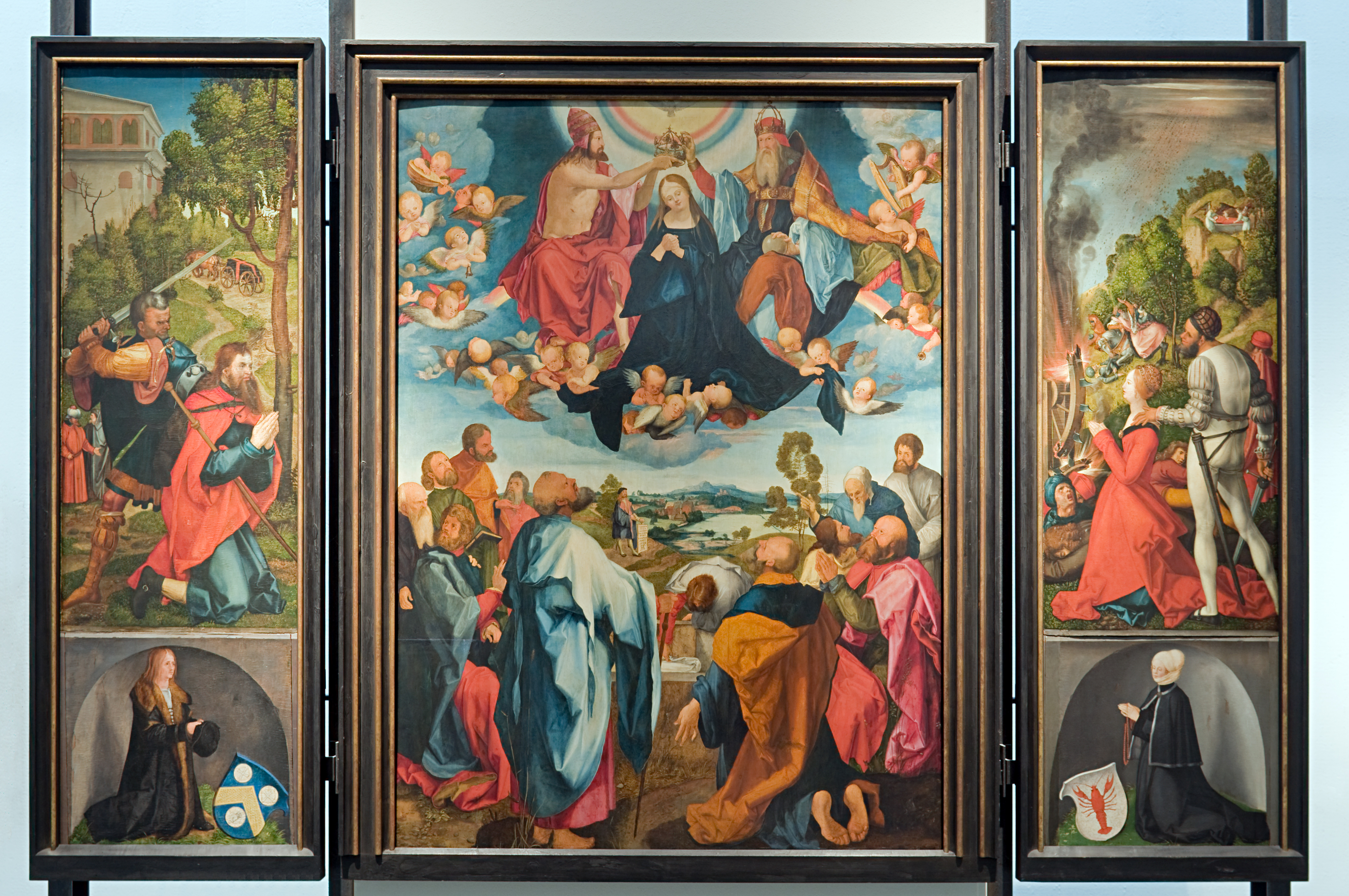
The Heller Altarpice (1508) from the Dominican cloister in Frankfurt by Albrecht Dürer

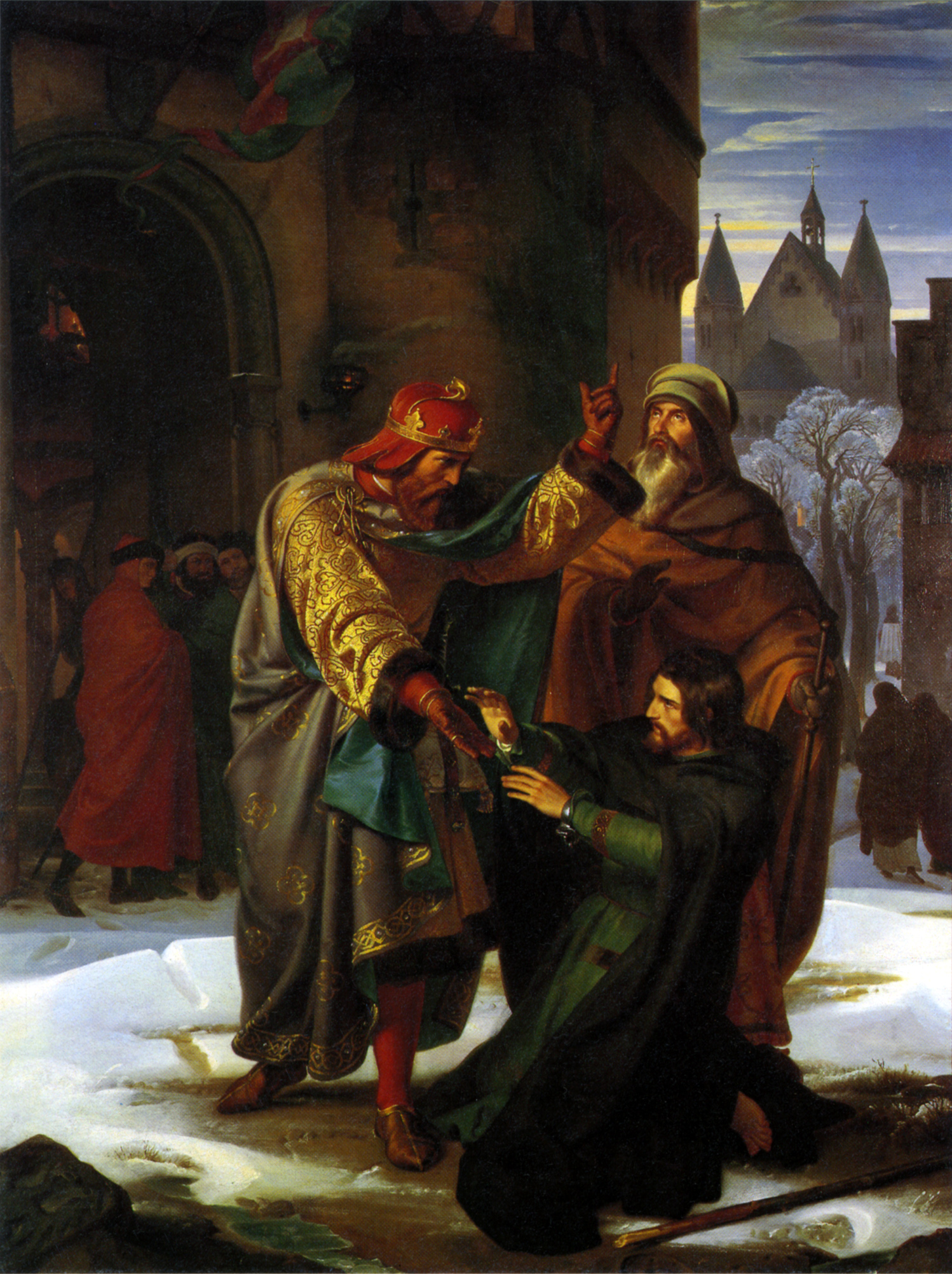
The Reconciliation of Emperor Otto I with his brother Heinrich in 941 in Frankfurt am Main (1840) by Alfred Rethel

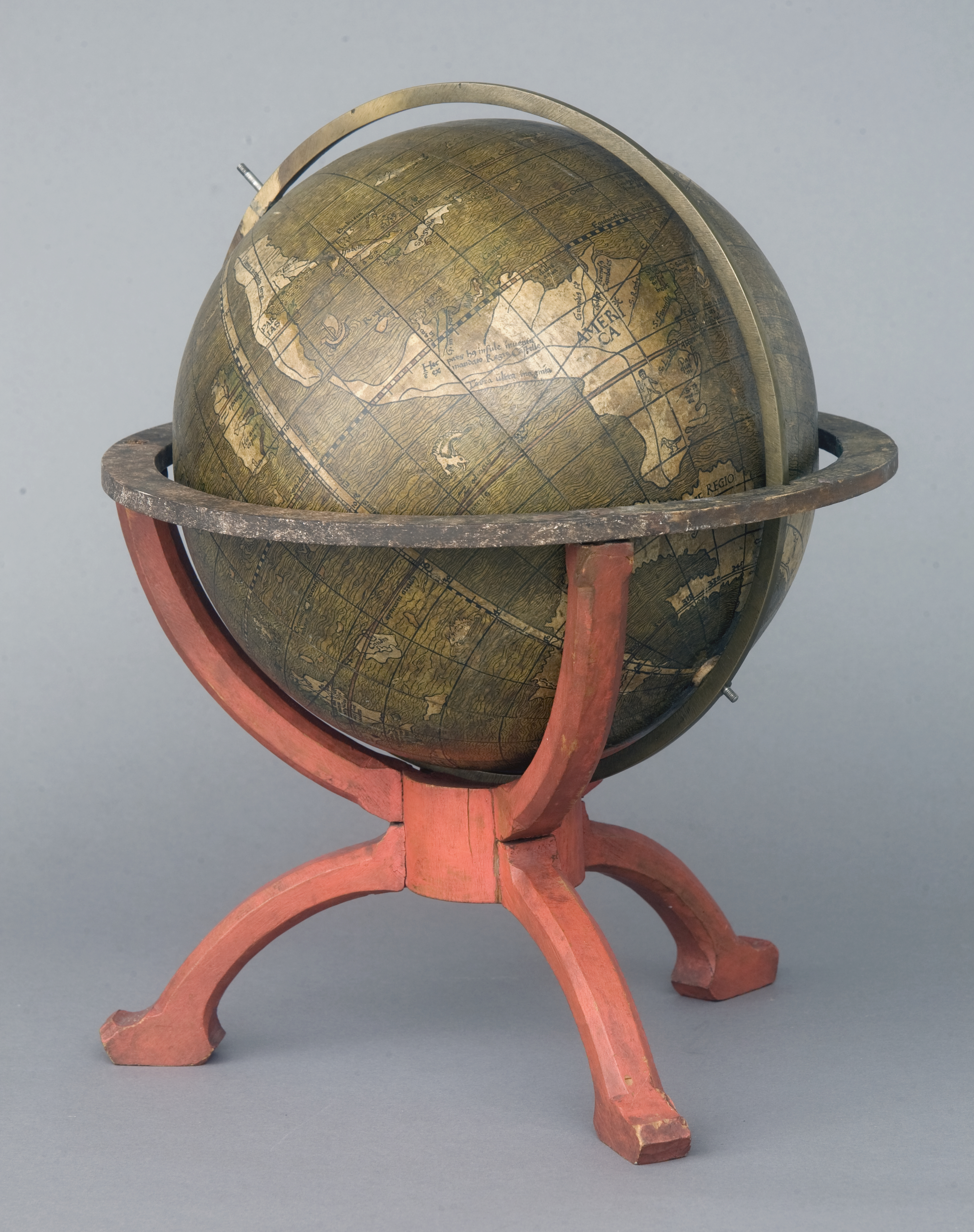
Johannes Schöner's Terrestrial globe with wooden frame, around 1515, wood, papier-mâché

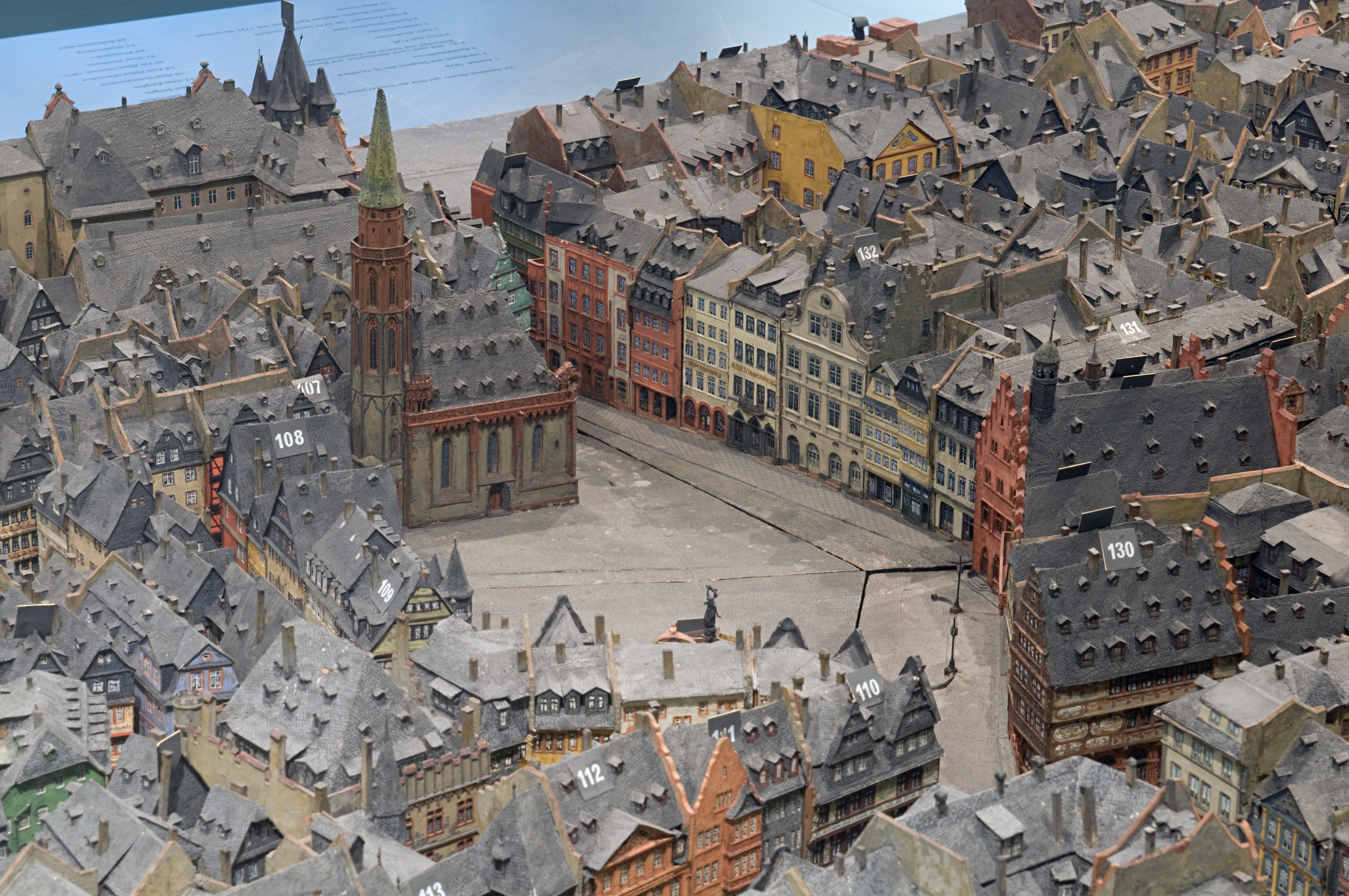
A highlight of the museum is the Treuner Brothers' model of the old town (Altstadt), showing how it looked before World War II bombing.

== See also ==
- List of museums in Germany
