= Schaumainkai =

Street in Frankfurt

Coordinates: 50°06′13″N 8°40′26″E

Schaumainkai is a street in central Frankfurt, Germany, running along the south side of the river Main. It includes a number of museums including the Städel. Because of the large concentration of museums on the riverside, the area is called Museumsufer ("Museum Embankment").

The street is sometimes partially closed to traffic and used for Frankfurt's largest flea market.

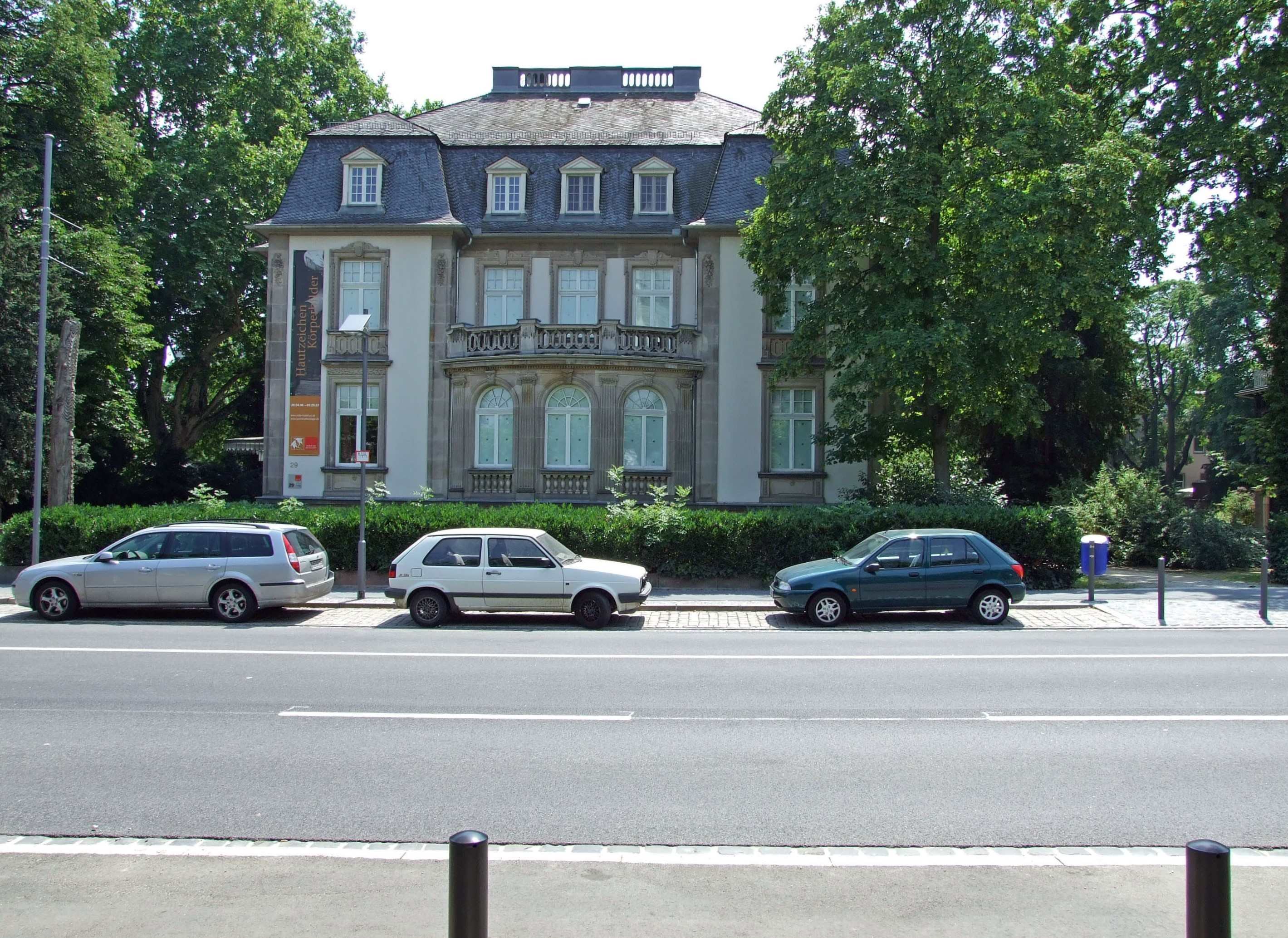
Museum der Weltkulturen, Haupthaus Schaumainkai 29

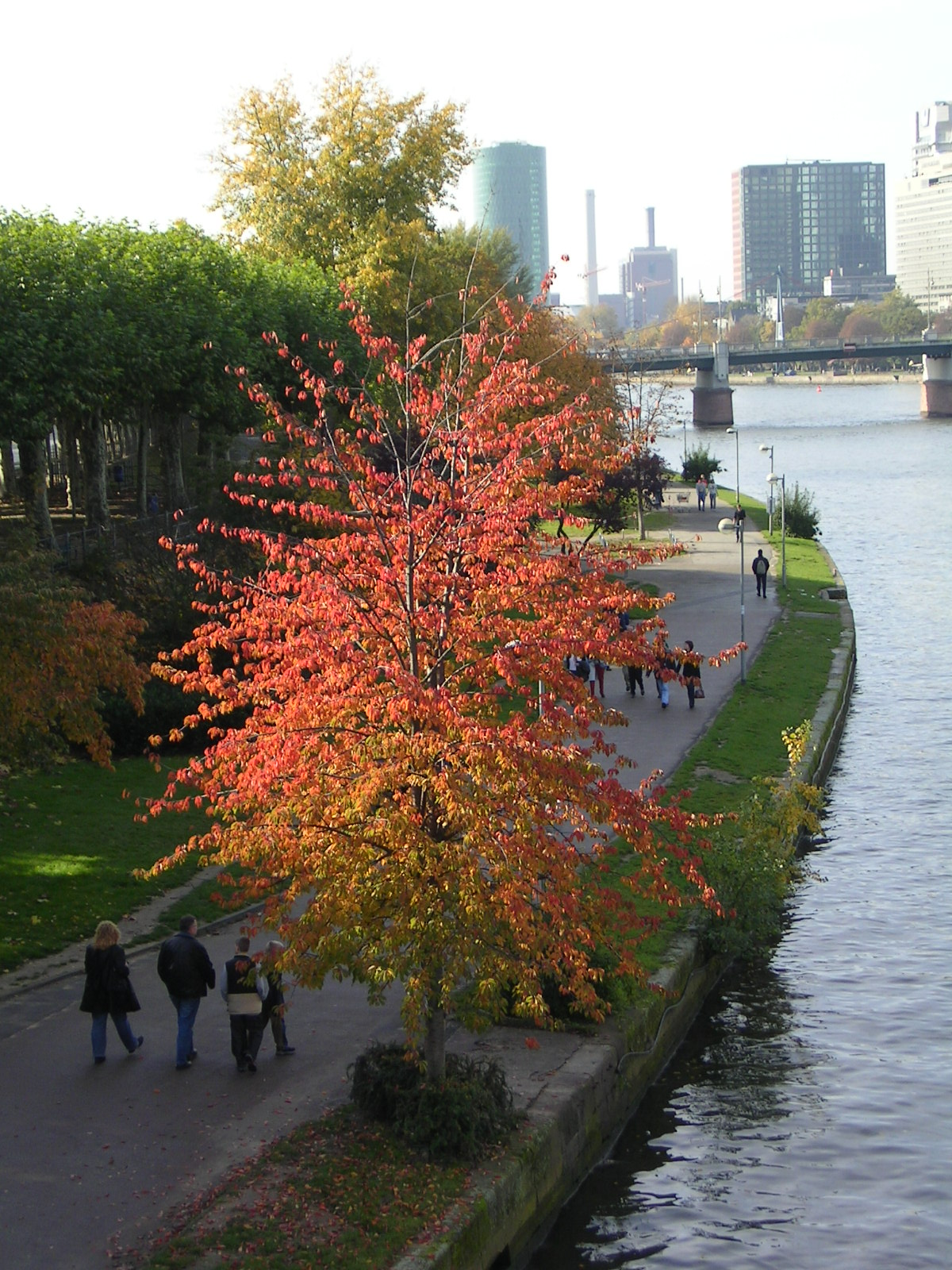
Bank of the river Main at Sachsenhausen-Nord

Museum Embankment Festival (seen from Städel)

Flea market on Schaumainkai

== See also ==
- Museumsufer
- Sachsenhausen (Frankfurt am Main)
