= Deutsches Architekturmuseum =

Museum in Frankfurt

Coordinates: 50°6′18″N 8°40′38.5″E

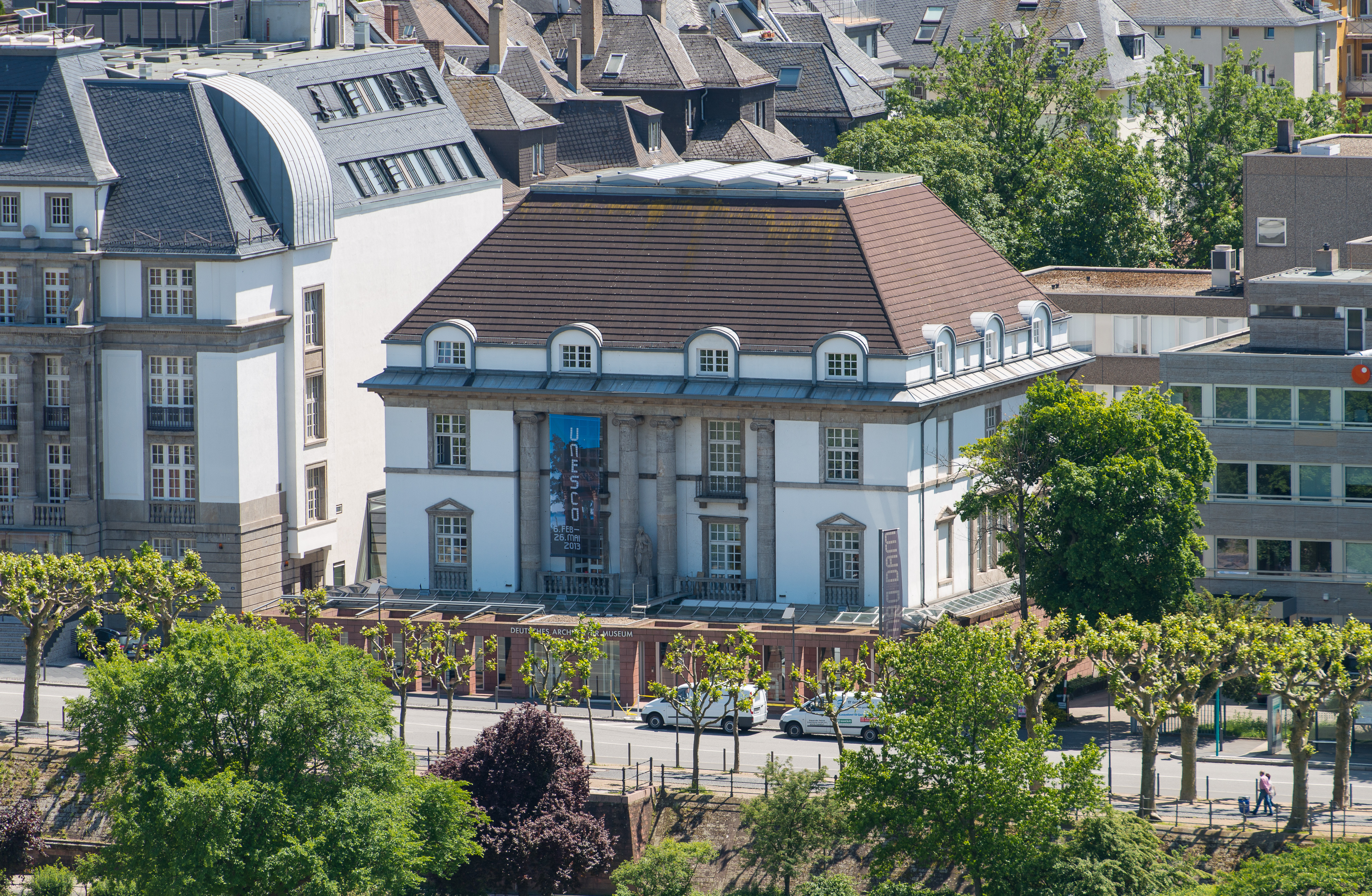
- Location: Museumsufer, Frankfurt, Germany
- Key holdings: Erich Mendelsohn, Mies van der Rohe, Archigram, Frank O. Gehry
- Collection size: 180,000 architectural drawings; 600 models
- Visitors: 110,712 (2018)
- Architect: Oswald Mathias Ungers (interior redesign)
- Public transit access: Schweizer Platz; Willy-Brandt-Platz; 15, 16 Schweizer Straße\Gartenstraße; 46 Untermainbrücke
- Website: dam-online.de

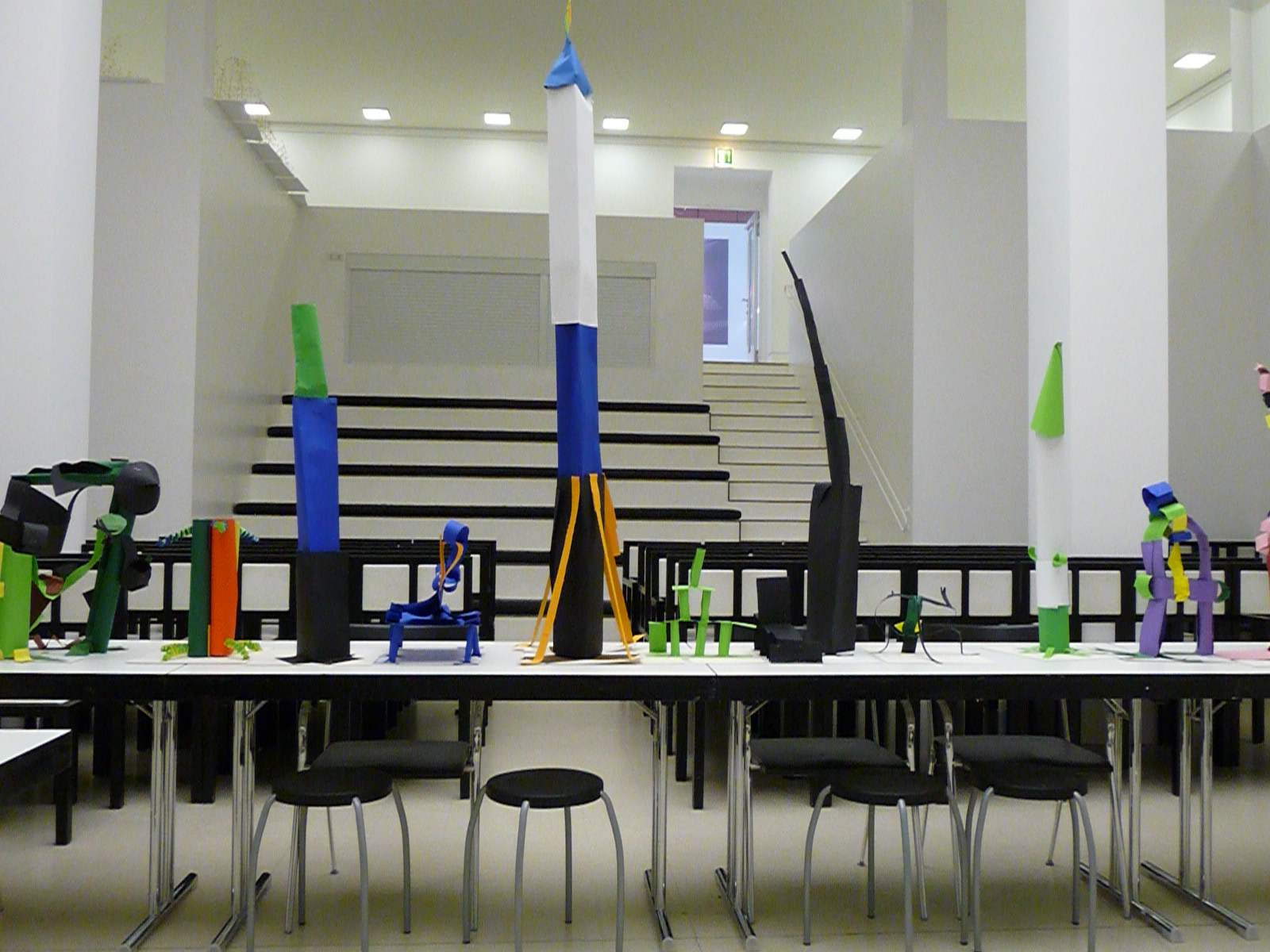
Interior of the museum

The Deutsches Architekturmuseum (English: German Architecture Museum), or DAM, is located on the Museumsufer in Frankfurt, Germany. Housed in an 18th-century building, the interior has been re-designed by Oswald Mathias Ungers in 1984 as a set of "elemental Platonic buildings within elemental Platonic buildings". It houses a permanent exhibition entitled "From Ancient Huts to Skyscrapers" which displays the history of architectural development in Germany.

The museum organises several temporary exhibitions every year, as well as conferences, symposia and lectures. It has a collection of ca. 180,000 architectural drawings and 600 models, including works by modern and contemporary classics like Erich Mendelsohn, Mies van der Rohe, Archigram and Frank O. Gehry. It also includes a reference library with approximately 25,000 books and magazines.

== Awards ==
The DAM grants several awards:

- DAM Preis für Architektur in Deutschland
- International High-Rise Award
- DAM Architectural Book Award
- Europäischer Architekturfotografiepreis
- European Prize for Urban Public Space
