= Liebieghaus =

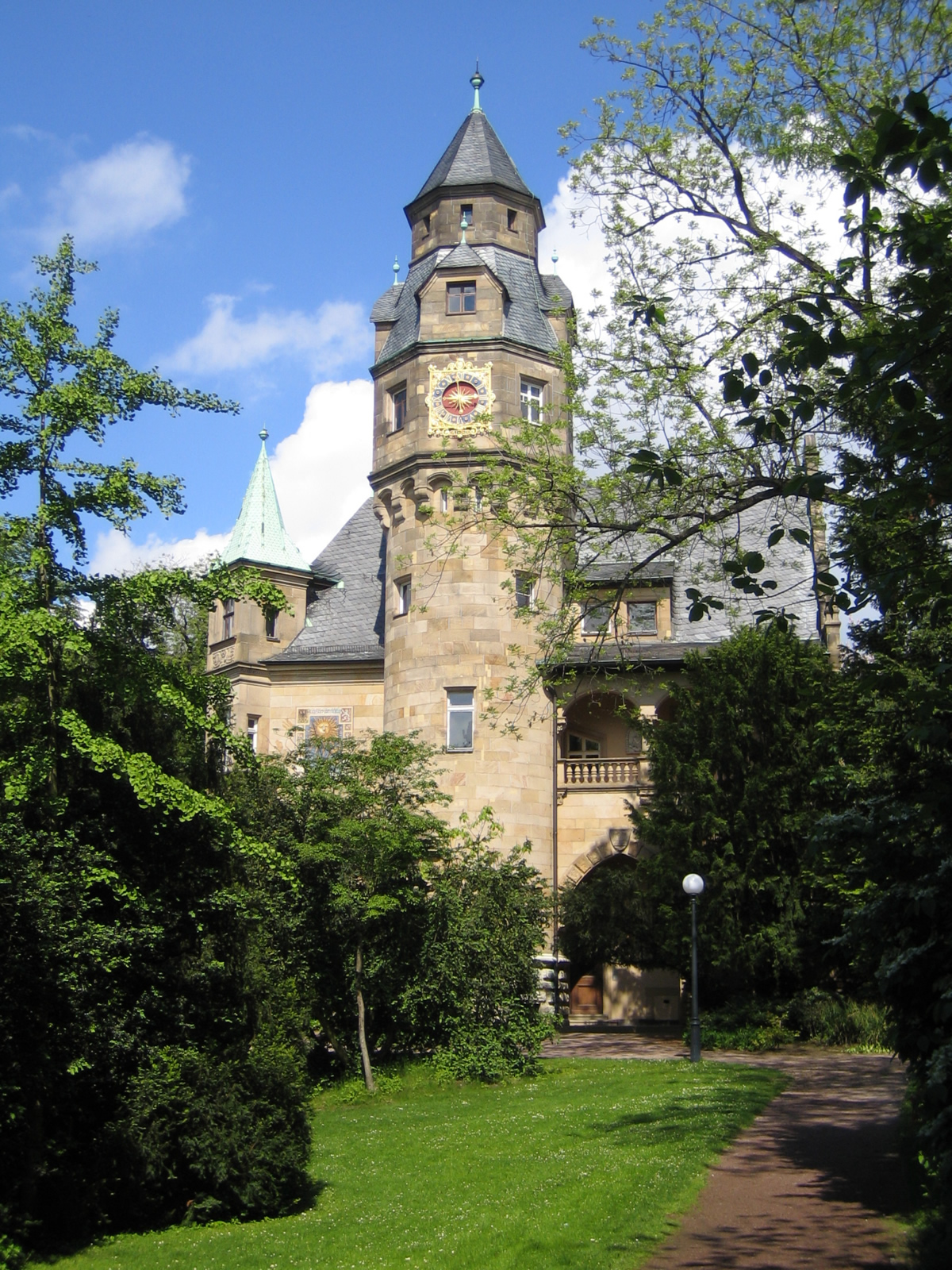
- The Liebieghaus in 2005
- Established: 1896/1908
- Location: Schaumainkai 71, Museumsufer, Frankfurt, Germany
- Coordinates: 50°06′07″N 8°40′18″E
- Type: Sculpture museum
- Key holdings: Rimini Altarpiece; Dannecker's Ariadne on the Panther
- Collections: Egyptian; Ancient Greek; Roman; Medieval, Baroque, Renaissance, Classical; Far East
- Collection size: 3,000
- Visitors: 54,483 (2025)
- Director: Philipp Demandt
- Architect: Leonhard Romeis
- Public transit access: Schweizer Platz (10 min); 15, 16 Otto-Hahn-Platz (5 min); 16, 17, 21 Stresemannallee / Gartenstraße (7 min)
- Website: www.liebieghaus.de

The Liebieghaus is a late 19th-century villa in Frankfurt, Germany. It contains a sculpture museum, the Liebieghaus Skulpturensammlung, which is part of the Museumsufer on the Sachsenhausen bank of the River Main. The collection comprises some 3,000 sculptures, spanning over 5,000 years of culture.

== History ==
The Liebieghaus was built in 1896 based on designs by Leonhard Romeis, in a palatial, historicist style, as a retirement home for the Bohemian textile manufacturer Baron Heinrich von Liebieg (1839–1904). The city of Frankfurt acquired the building in 1908 and devoted it to the sculpture collection. The first director of the Skulpturensammlung der Städtischen Galerie Frankfurt was Georg Swarzenski. In 1909, Paul Kanold built a gallery wing extension to the villa, that was completed in 1990 by Scheffler and Warschauer.

A renovation was completed in October 2009. This included adding a publicly accessible "Open Depot" in the gallery wing basement, making it possible for the first time to view certain parts of the collection that are not in the permanent exhibition. As of 2023, the exhibition space is 1,600 m^{2} (17,000 ft^{2}).

Max Hollein was the director from January 2006 to 2016, followed by Philipp Demandt. Since 2007, Vinzenz Brinkmann has headed the antiquities collection. His main research areas are the colors of antiquity and ancient myths. Since 2006, Stefan Roller has been the head of the Medieval Department. His research focuses on Southern German sculpture of the Late Gothic period.

== Collection ==
The museum includes ancient Egyptian, Greek, Roman sculpture, (Note: Wall colors: sand gray (Egypt), light blue (Greece), bright red (Rome), anthracite (show depot)) as well as Medieval, Baroque, Renaissance and Classicist pieces, and works from the Far East. The collection was built up mostly through endowments and international purchases.

The building stands on the Schaumainkai, in a garden in which a number of sculptures are also on display, including a replica of Dannecker's Ariadne on the Panther. The original, which was acquired by the banker Simon Moritz von Bethmann in 1810, is in the depot.

Other major exhibits include:

- A marble discobolus
- A marble statue of Athena, a Roman copy of a Greek original by Myron
- Carolingian reliefs carved from ivory (mid-9th century)
- An Ottonian crucifix (mid-11th century)
- A Romanesque king's head from a statue from the Île-de-France
- Fragments from a Florentine tomb by Tino di Camaino (probably after 1318)
- An alabaster sculpture of the Trinity by Hans Multscher (c. 1430)
- A Woman of the Apocalypse by Tilman Riemenschneider
- The Rimini Altar, an alabaster calvary from northern France (c. 1430)
- A bust of Barbara von Ottenheim by Nikolaus Gerhaert (1463–64)
- Abbot Saint, a late Gothic wooden sculpture

== Permanent exhibitions ==
- Splendid White – Reiner Winkler's ivory collection (gallery wing basement)

== Temporary exhibitions ==
- 2008/2009: Gods in Color
- 2011/2012: Nikolaus Gerhaert. The Medieval Sculptor
- 2012: Jeff Koons. The Sculptor (at the Liebieghaus)
- 2013: Back to Classic. Ancient Greece reconsidered
- 2015/2016: Dangerous Liaisons. The Art of the French Rococo
- 2020/2021: Gods in Color – Golden Edition
- 2021/2022: Mission Rimini
- 2023/2024: Machine room of the gods (Note: Exhibits: Pythagorean theorem, Daidalos, Sphaira, Antikythera mechanism, Astrolabe and Jeff Koons' Apollo Kithara.)

== Gallery ==
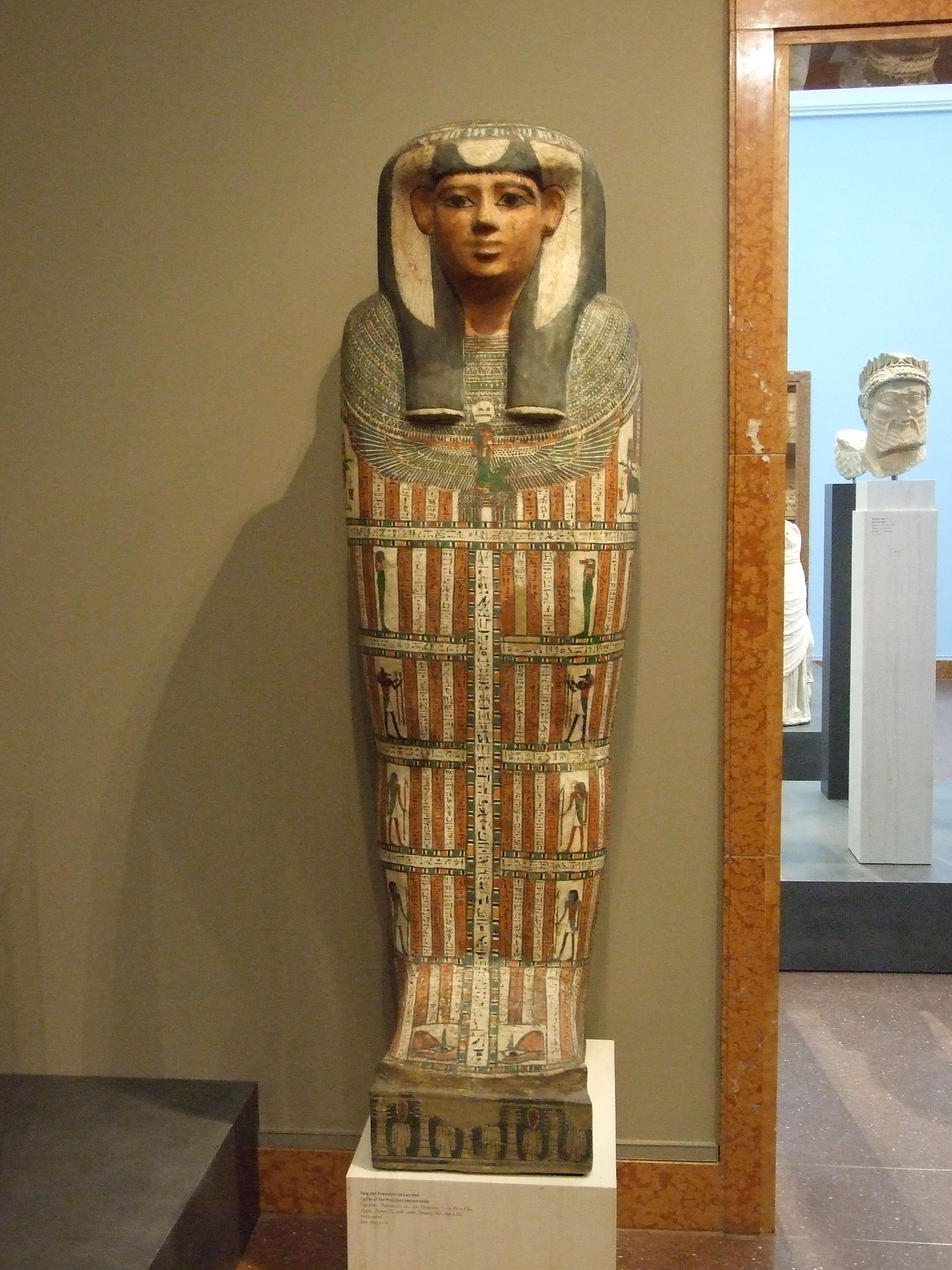
Coffin of the priestess "Iset-en-kheb", Egypt

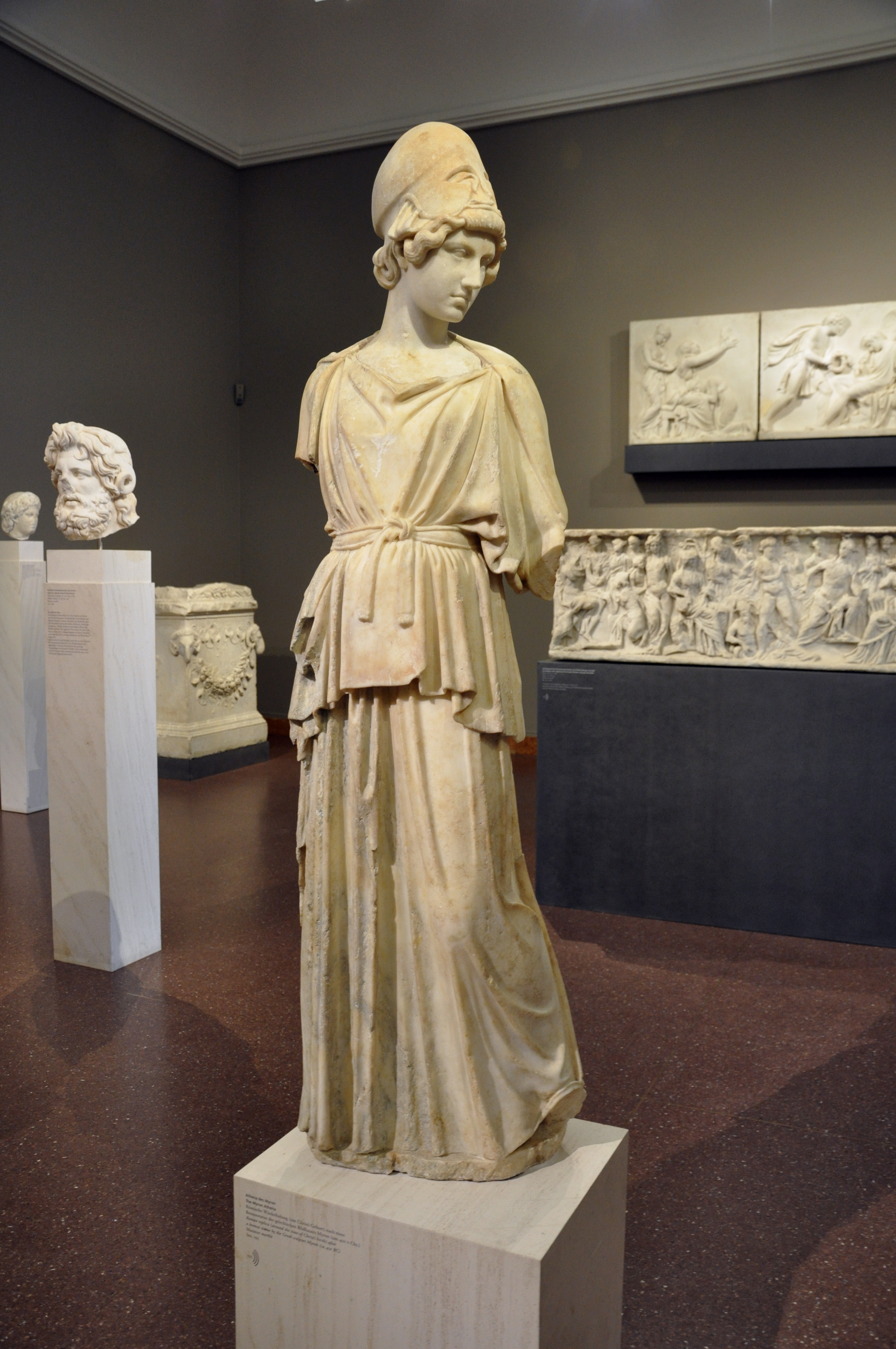
Myron's Athena, Roman replica

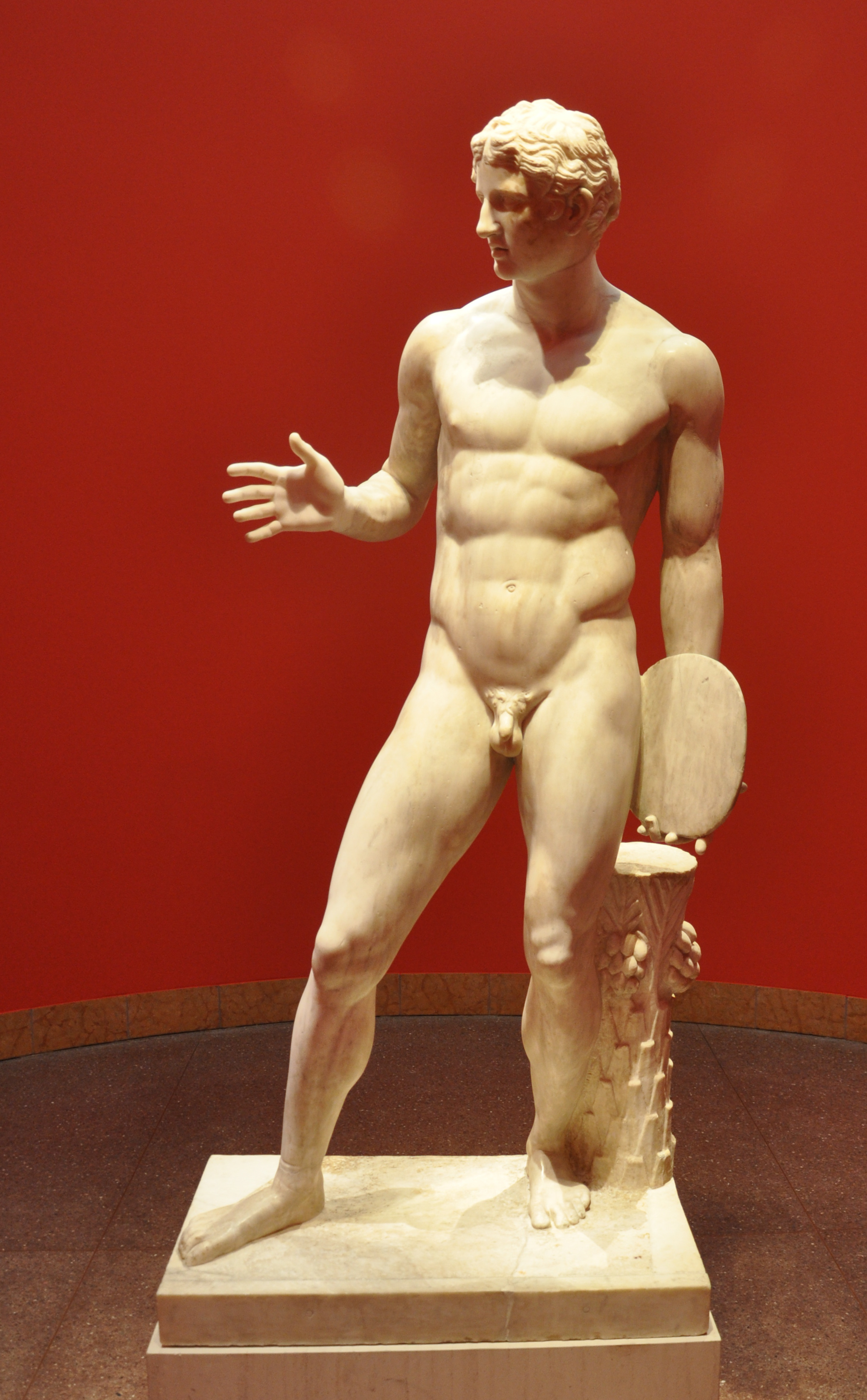
Discus thrower, Roman replica of a Greek statue possibly by Naukydes of Argos

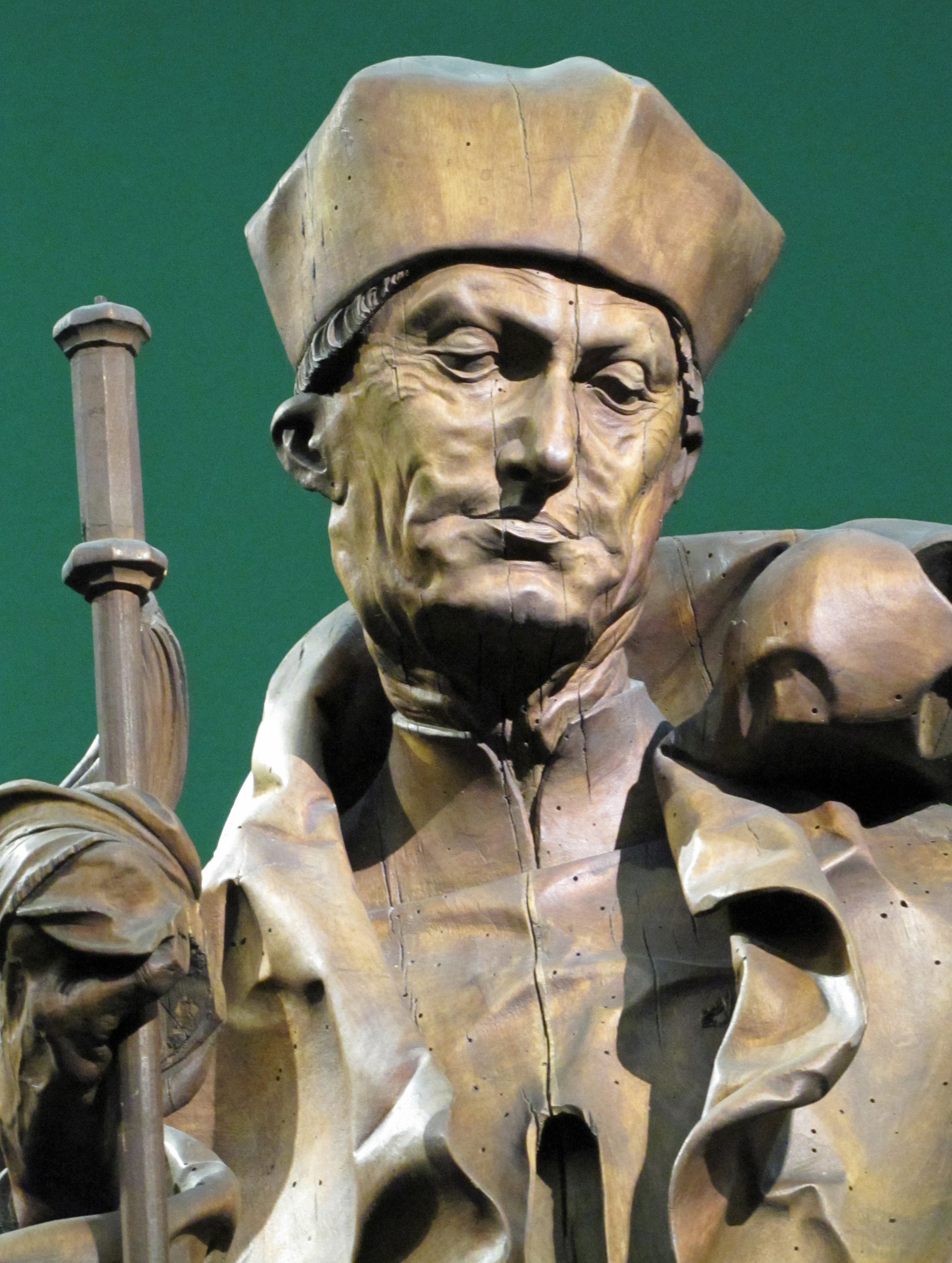
Abbot Saint

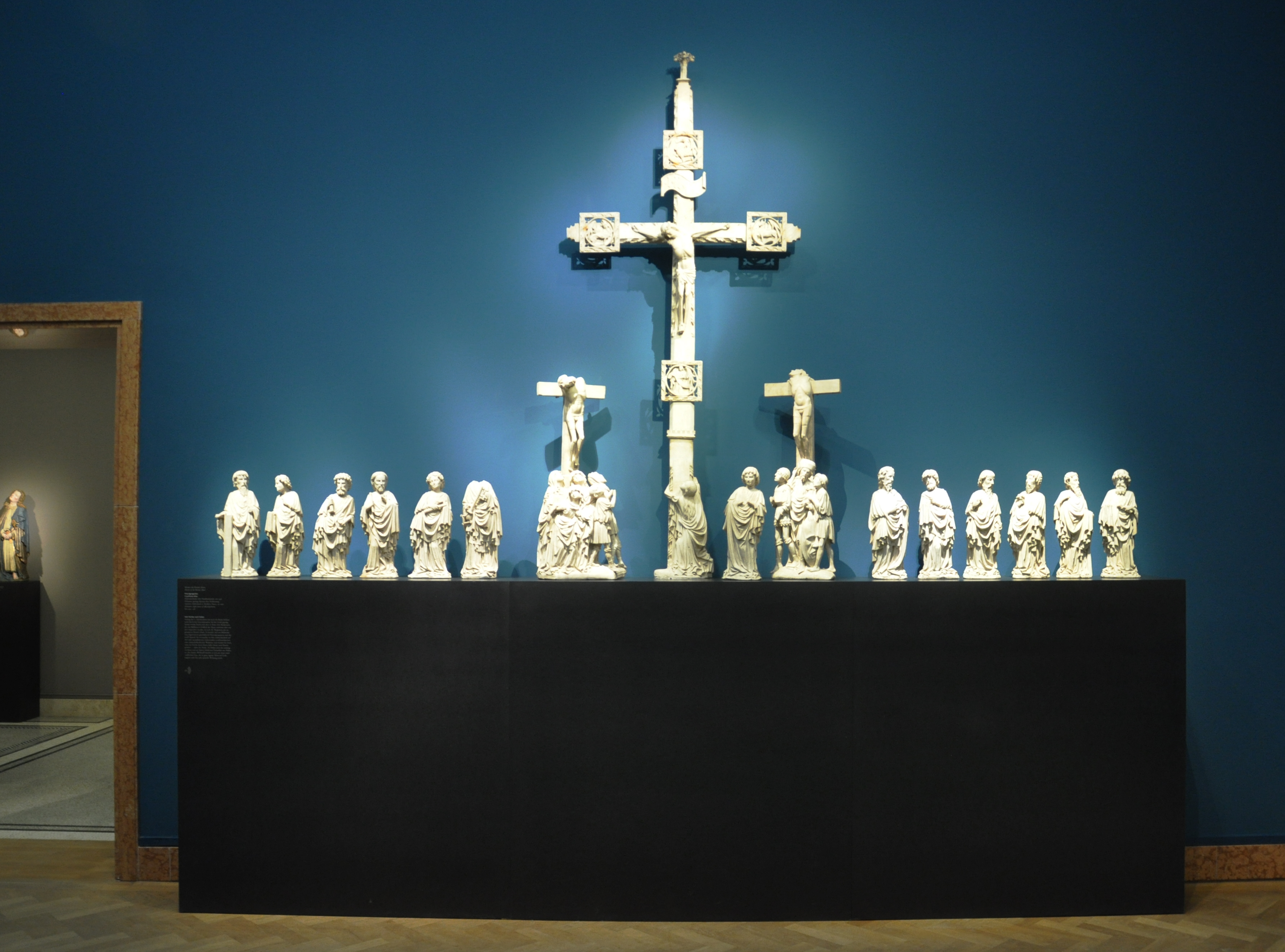
Rimini Altarpiece

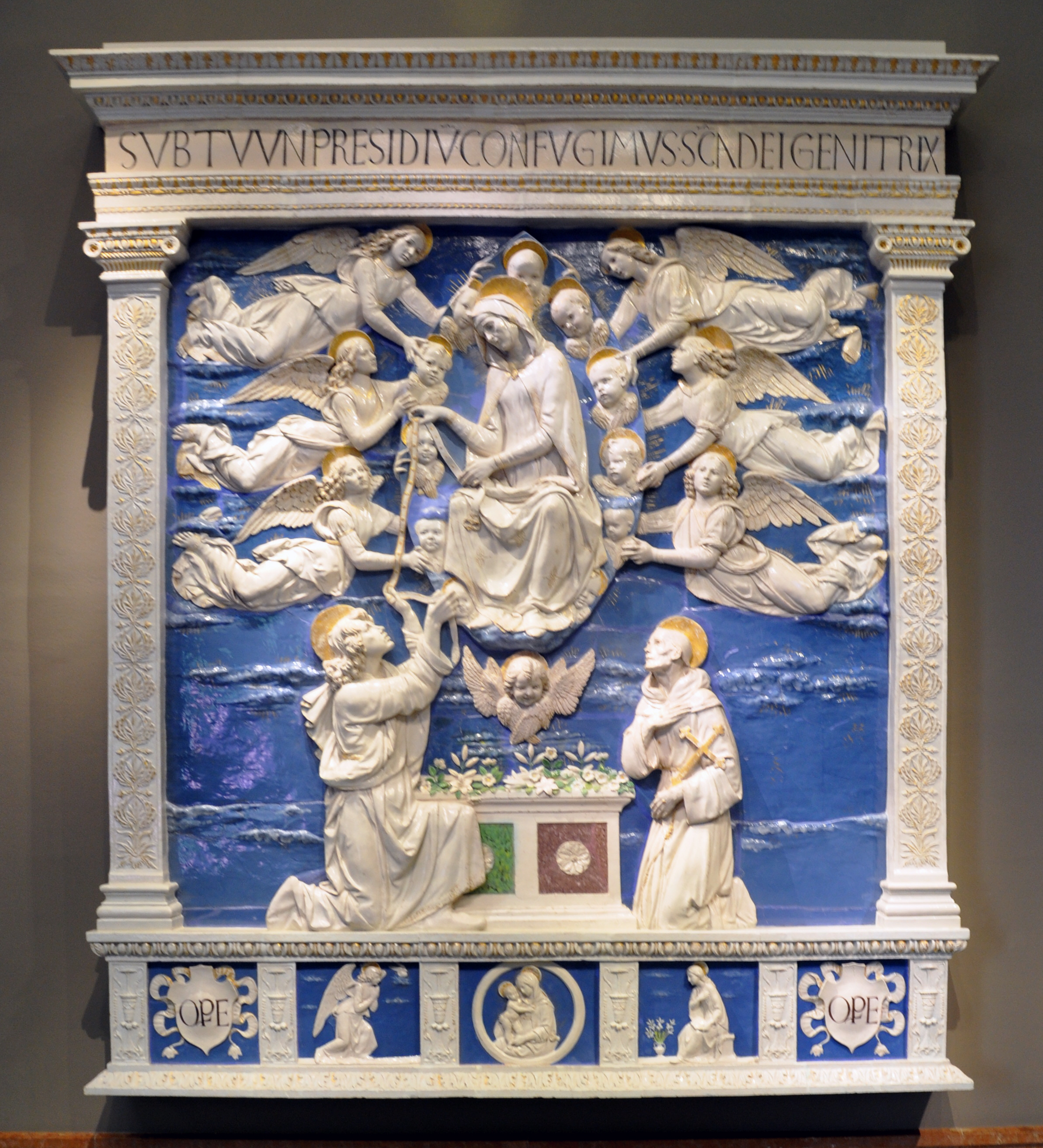
Andrea della Robbia Madonna della Cintola

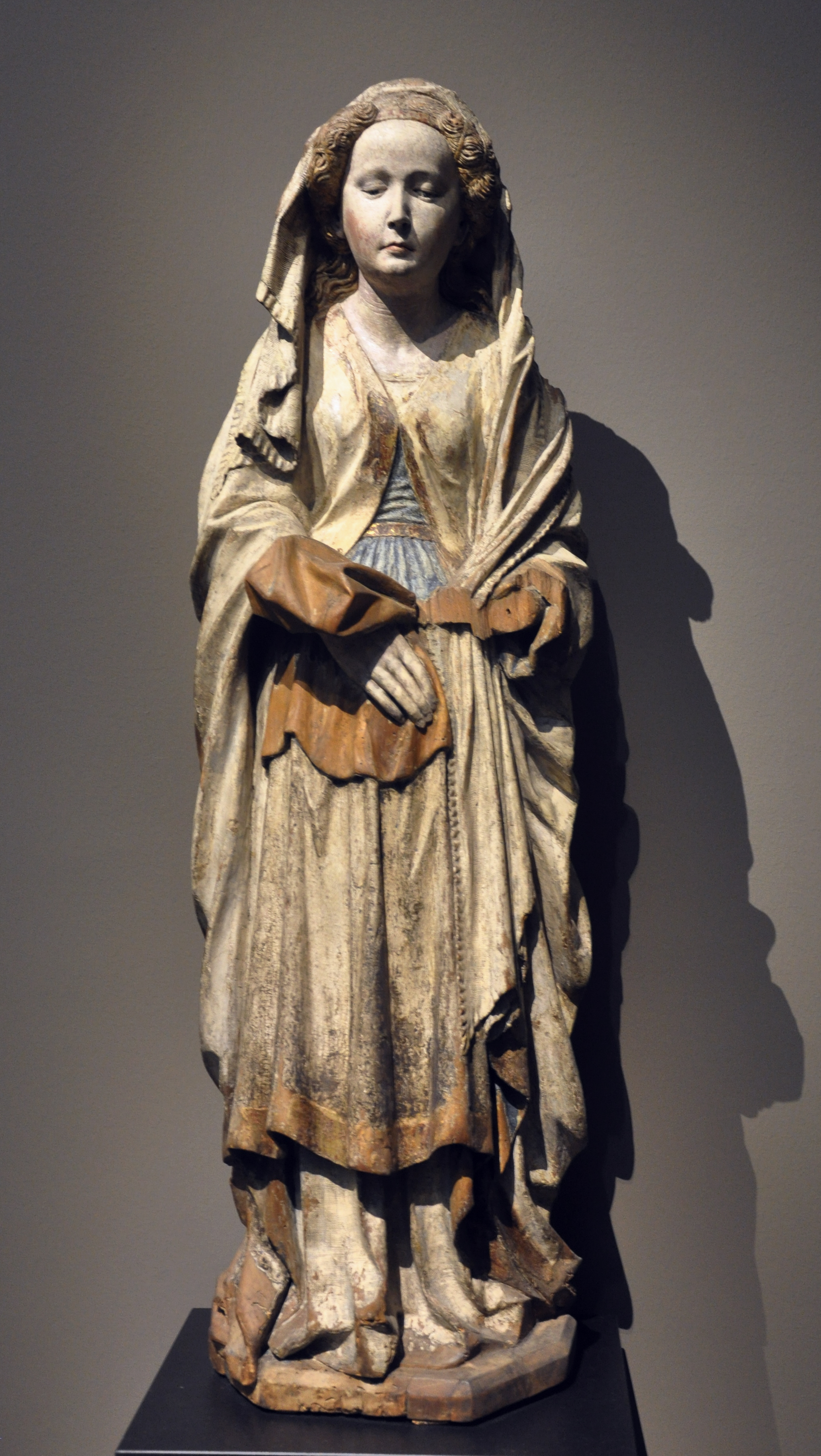
Hans Multscher St. Mary Magdalene

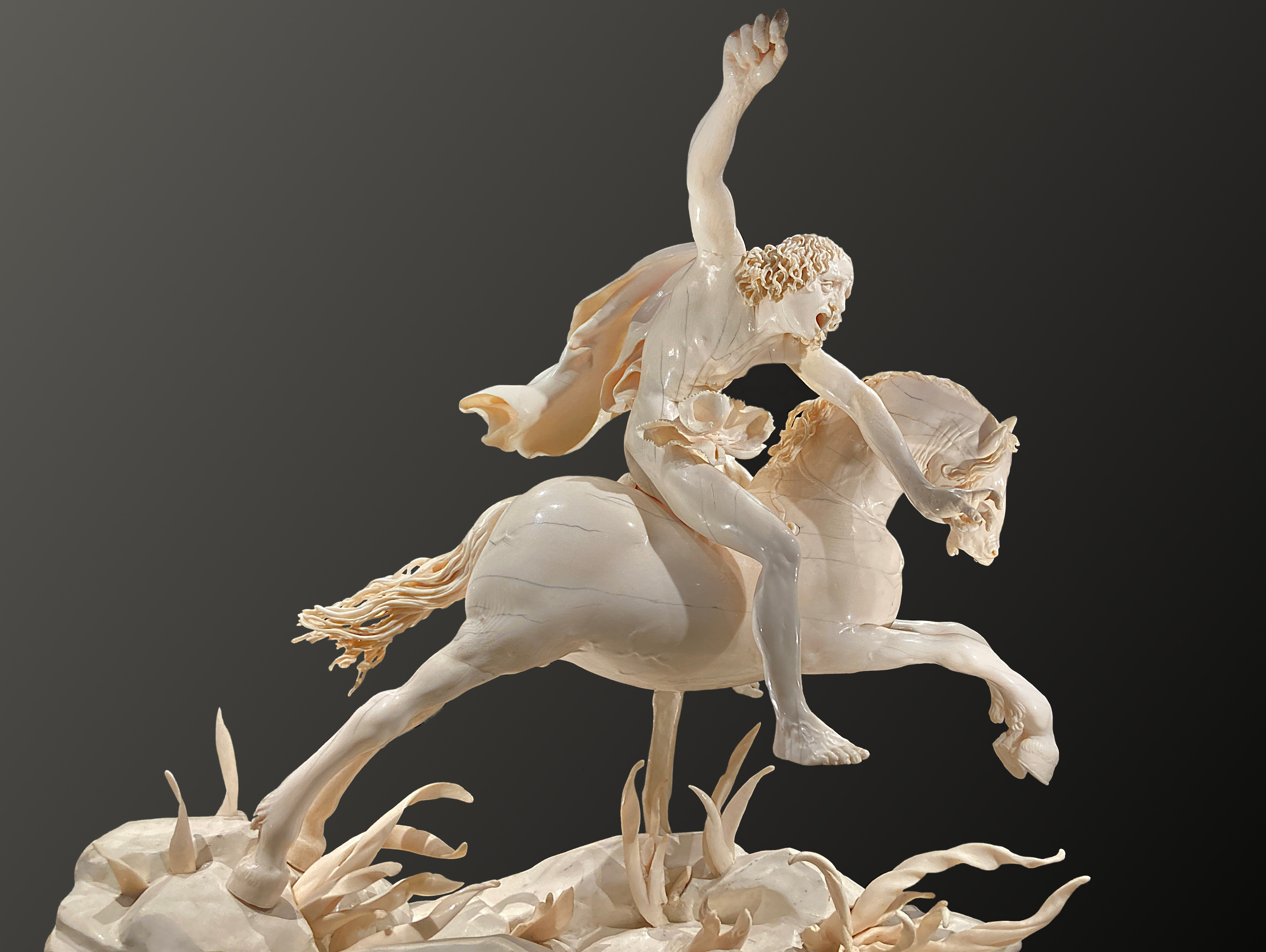
Spendid White: Master of the Furies Fury on a charging horse

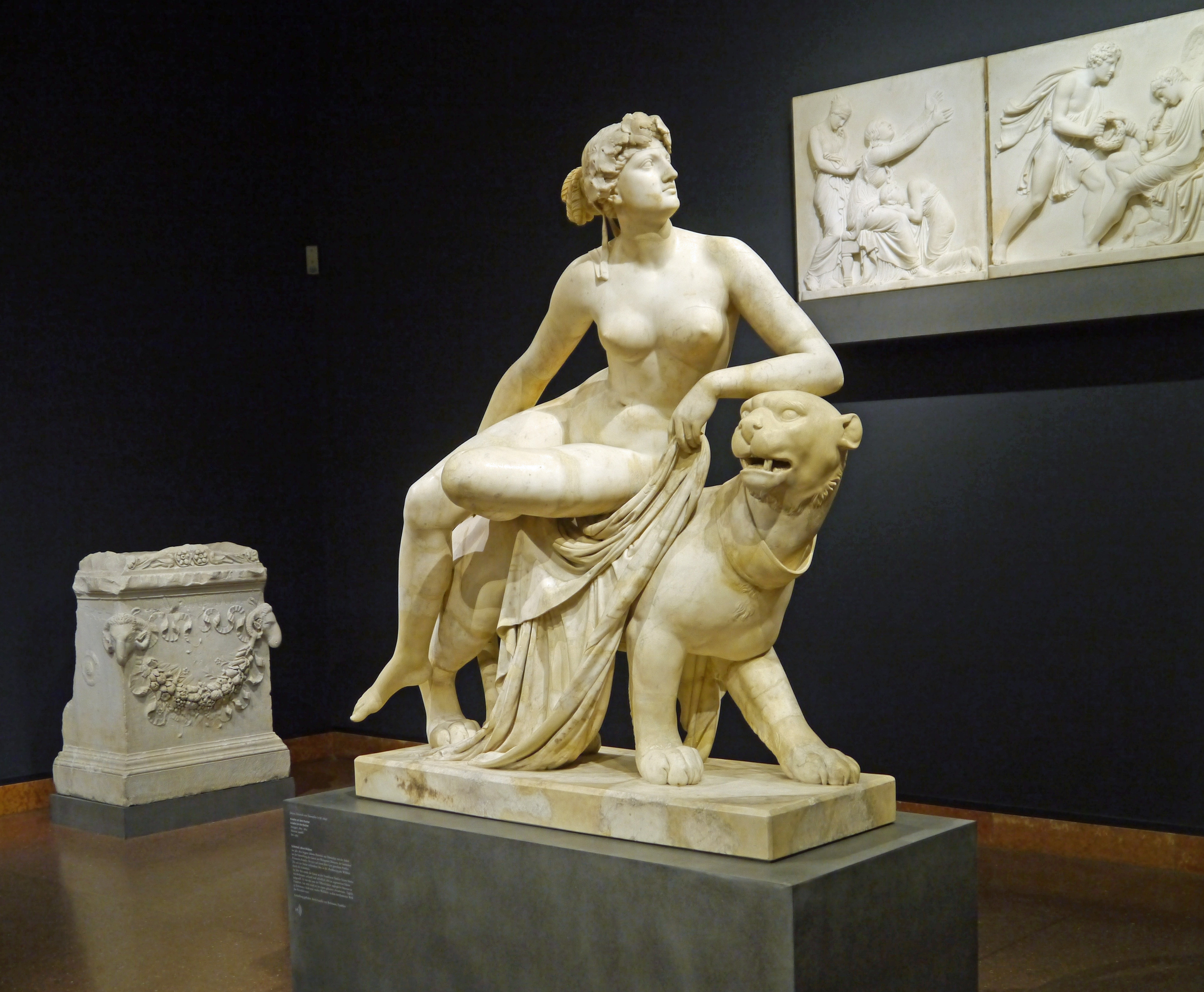
Johann Heinrich von Dannecker's Ariadne on the Panther

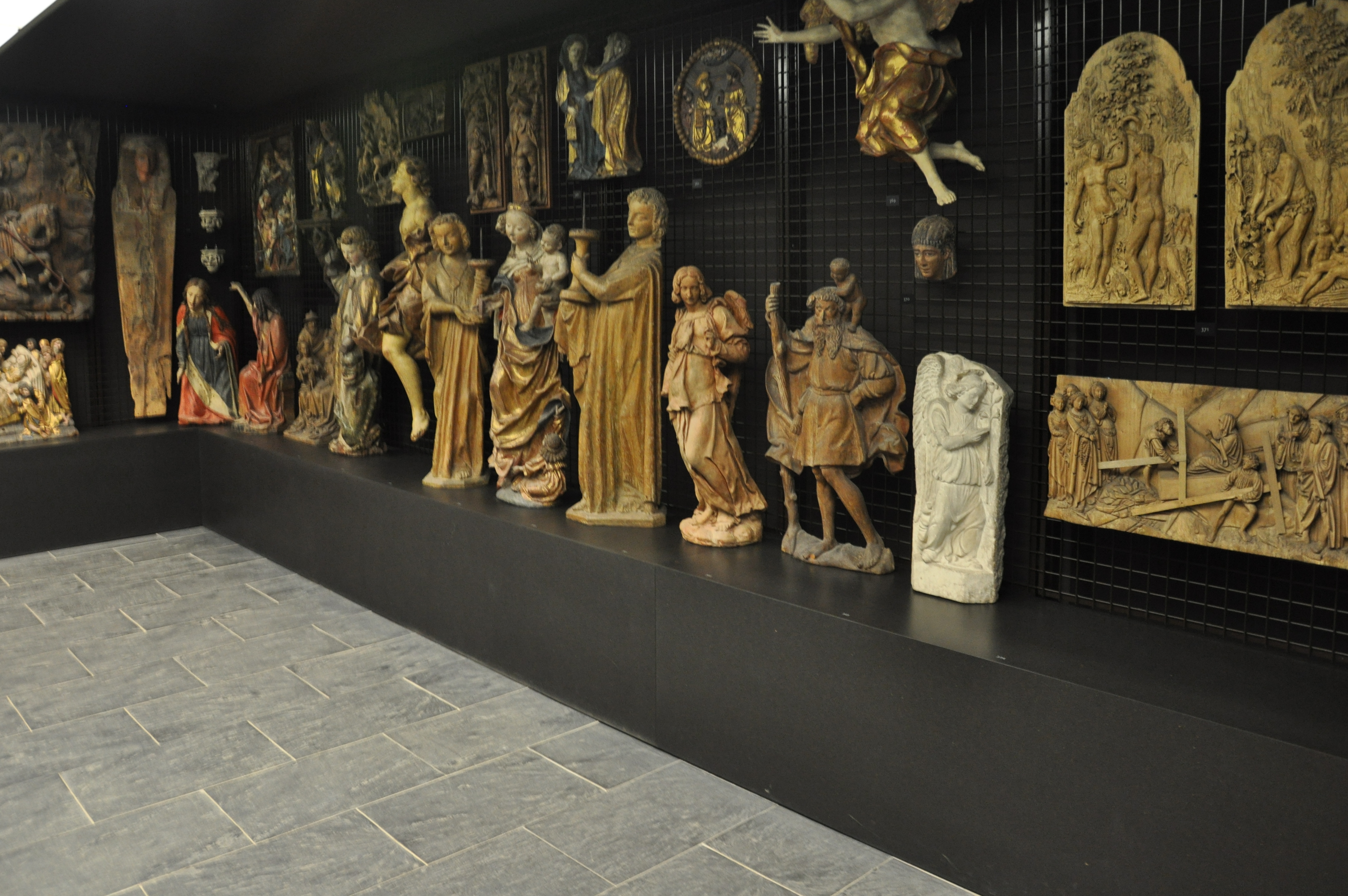
show depot

== See also ==
- Städel
- List of museums in Germany
- List of art museums
- Gods in Color
- Meister des Rimini-Altars
