= Demandt =

Demandt is a surname. Notable people with that surname include:

- Alexander Demandt (born 1937), German historian
- Philipp Demandt (born 1971), German art historian
- Sven Demandt (born 1965), German football coach and player
