= Gods in Color =

Travelling exhibition

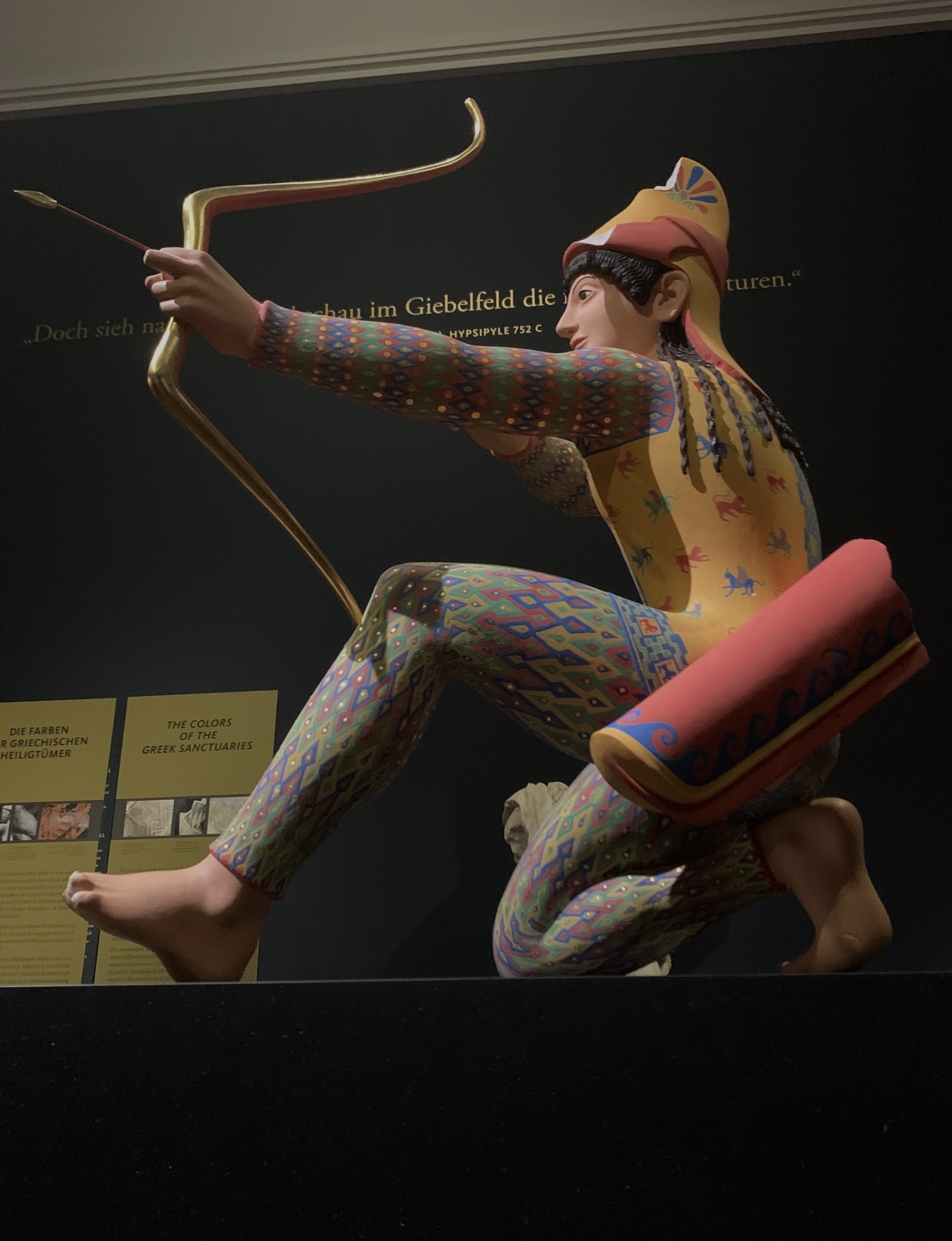
Experimental color reconstruction of an archer from the pediments of the Temple of Aphaia on Aegina, Variant C, Frankfurt Liebieghaus 2021

Gods in Color or Gods in Colour (original title in German: Bunte Götter – Die Farbigkeit antiker Skulptur ("Painted gods – the polychromy of ancient sculpture") is a travelling exhibition of varying format and extent that has been shown in multiple cities worldwide. Its subject is ancient polychromy, i.e. the original, brightly painted, appearance of ancient sculpture and architecture.

== Concept ==
The exhibition is based on the conclusions drawn from research on ancient polychromy, conducted especially by the classical archaeologist Vinzenz Brinkmann since the early 1980s, based on earlier works by Volkmar von Graeve. Working together with Raimund Wünsche, the director of the Glyptothek at Munich, Brinkmann developed the concept for the exhibition, culminating in the original Munich show in 2003. It displayed copies of ancient sculpture in their reconstructed and painted appearance that had been produced during his studies, as well as new reconstructions created especially for the exhibition, in conjunction with the originals or comparable ancient sculptures. Soon, the exhibition began to travel to other cities in Germany and beyond.

Since 2007, the exhibition and underlying research has received support from a foundation created by the government of Bavaria, as well as private donations. After the original German catalogue produced for the 2003 Munich exhibition, new editions were issued for later showings, most recently for the 2020 one in Frankfurt. An English catalogue was published for the 2007–2008 showing in the Arthur M. Sackler Museum at Harvard University and more recently for the show in San Francisco (Legion of Honor (museum)). In 2007, the Colored Gods formed part of the exhibition Color of Life – Polychromy in Sculpture from Antiquity to the Present, at the Getty Villa in Los Angeles, with contributions in the respective catalogue.

== Dates ==
So far, the exhibit has been shown in the following locations:

1. 16 December 2003 – 29 February 2004: Glyptothek, Munich
2. Ny Carlsberg Glyptotek, Copenhagen
3. Vatican Museums, Rome
4. 11 August – 20 November 2005: Skulpturhalle, Basel
5. 2 December 2005 – 26 March 2006: Allard Pierson Museum, Amsterdam
6. 2006: Archaeological Museum, Istanbul
7. 9 January – 24 March 2007: as Πολύχρωμοι Θεοί/Polychromoi Theoi, National Archaeological Museum, Athens
8. 4 April – 1 July 2007: Museum für Kunst und Gewerbe, Hamburg
9. 22 September 2007 – 20 January 2008: as Gods in Color. Painted Sculpture of Classical Antiquity, Arthur M. Sackler Museum at Harvard University, Cambridge (Massachusetts)
10. 6 March – 23 June 2008: Part of exhibition Color of Life – Polychromy in Sculpture from Antiquity to the Present, Getty Villa, Los Angeles
11. 8 October 2008 – 15 February 2009: Liebieghaus, Frankfurt am Main
12. 6 March – 1 June 2009: Antikensammlung, Schloss Wilhelmshöhe, Kassel
13. 18 December 2009 – 18 April 2010: Museo Arqueológico Regional de la Comunidad de Madrid, Madrid
14. 13 July – 3 October 2010: Antikensammlung in the Pergamonmuseum, Berlin
15. 9 October 2010 – 30 January 2011: as White Lies, Medelhavsmuseet, Stockholm
16. 6 March – 31 July 2011: Georg-August-Universität, Archaeological Institute, Göttingen
17. 29 October 2011 – 20 May 2012: Heidelberg University
18. 28 June – 28 October 2012: Kunstsammlungen, Ruhr University Bochum
19. 13 November 2012 – 17 March 2013: Kunsthistorisches Museum, Vienna
20. 11 April 2014 – 10 August 2014: Museum of Tübingen University, Tübingen
21. 22 January 2015 – 14 June 2015: Ashmolean Museum, Oxford
22. 11 October 2016 – 8 January 2017: Palacio de Bellas Artes, Mexico City
23. 28 October 2017 – 7 January 2018: Legion of Honor (museum), San Francisco
24. 30 January 2020 – 26 September 2021: Bunte Götter – Golden Edition, Liebieghaus, Frankfurt am Main
25. 5 July 2022 – 23 March 2023: participation in Chroma. Ancient Sculpture in Color, Metropolitan Museum of Art, New York City
26. October 2023 – June 2024: Gallo-Roman Museum, Tongeren, Belgium

== Research and reconstruction objects (selection) ==
West and East pediment of Aphaea Temple on Aegina

- Archer in Scythian garment (three variants)
- Statue of Athena (two variants)
- Head of a warrior (two variants)
- Shield with boar as device
- Shield with eagle and serpent

Sculpture from the Athenian Acropolis

- Statue of the so-called Peplos Kore (three variants)
- Cuirassed Torso (two variants)
- So-called Chios Kore
- So-called Persian Rider
- Riace Bronzes

Sculpture from Attica

- Grave Statue of Phrasikleia Kore
- Grave Stele of Aristion (two variants)
- Theseus and Antiope from Eretria (two variants)
- Grave Stele of Paramythion (two variants)

Sculpture from Delos

- So-called Small Herculaneum Woman
- Statue of a Muse (five variants)

Other sculpture from Greece

- Kouros of Tenea
- Sphinx from Thasos
- Bronzes from Quirinal (so-called Boxer at Rest and so-called Hellenistic Prince)

Sculpture from Pompeii

- So-called Winckelmann-Artemis (three variants)
- So-called Venus Lovatelli

Roman portraiture

- Portrait of Emperor Caligula (three variants)

Elements from Greek Architecture

- Antefix from the Temple of Aphaea
- Ionic capital from the Athenian Agora

== Catalogues ==
In German:

- Vinzenz Brinkmann, Raimund Wünsche (eds.): Bunte Götter. Die Farbigkeit antiker Skulptur. Staatliche Antikensammlungen und Glyptothek, Munich 2004. ISBN 3-933200-08-3. [Original catalogue]
- Various editions coinciding with later showings
- Vinzenz Brinkmann, Andreas Scholl (eds.): Bunte Götter. Die Farbigkeit antiker Skulptur. Hirmer, Munich, 2010. ISBN 978-3-7774-2781-2
- Vinzenz Brinkmann, Ulrike Koch-Brinkmann (eds.): Bunte Götter – Golden Edition. Die Farbigkeit antiker Skulptur. Prestel, Munich 2020.

In English:

- Vinzenz Brinkmann (ed.): Gods in Color – Painted Sculpture of Classical Antiquity, Biering & Brinkmann, Munich, 2007. ISBN 3-930609-54-1 [Coinciding with Harvard showing]
- Roberta Panzanelli, Eike Schmidt, Kenneth Lapatin (eds.): The Color of Life: Polychromy in Sculpture from Antiquity to the Present, Getty Research Institute, Los Angeles, 2008. ISBN 0-892369-18-3 [Catalogue for the L.A. exhibition, including sections on the Gods in Color exhibit]
- Vinzenz Brinkmann, Oliver Primavesi, Max Hollein: Circumlitio. The Polychromy of Antique and Medieval Sculpture. 2010.
- Vinzenz Brinkmann, Ulrike Koch-Brinkmann, Renée Dreyfus: Gods in Color – Polychromy in the Ancient World, Prestel, New York 2017.

== Gallery ==
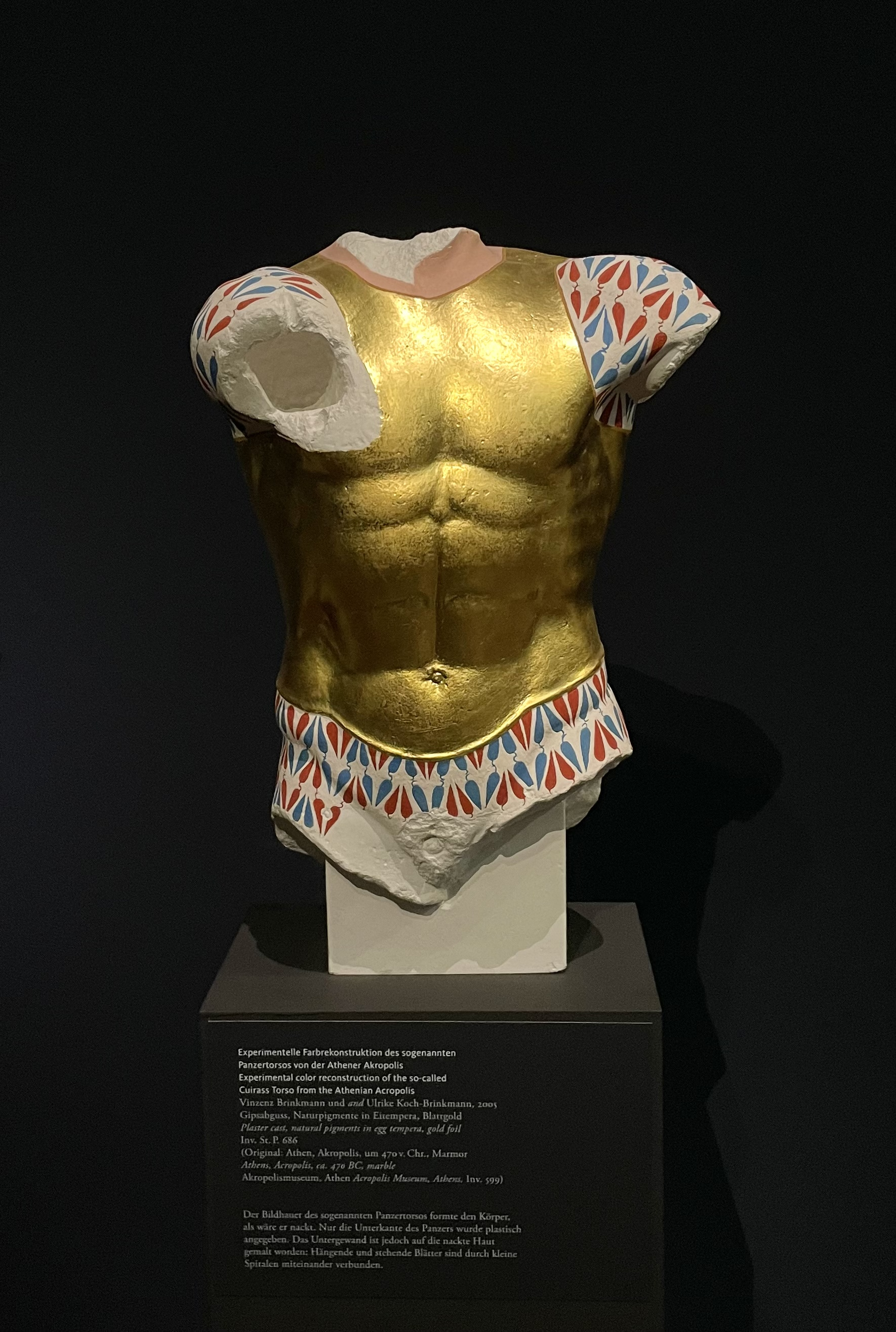
Experimental color reconstruction of a marble torso from the Athenian Acropolis, Liebieghaus Frankfurt

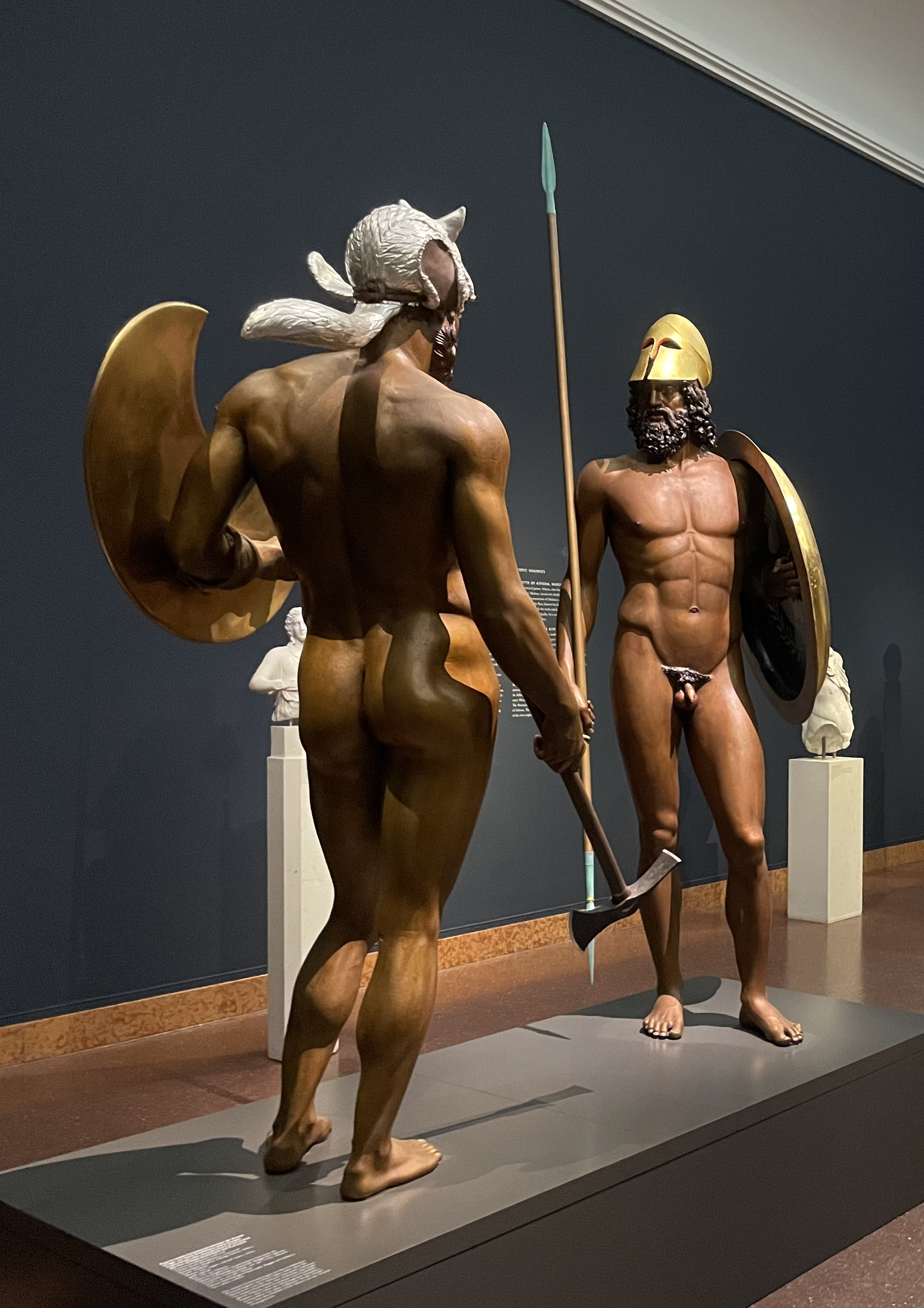
Experimental Reconstruction of the Riace bronzes, Liebieghaus Frankfurt

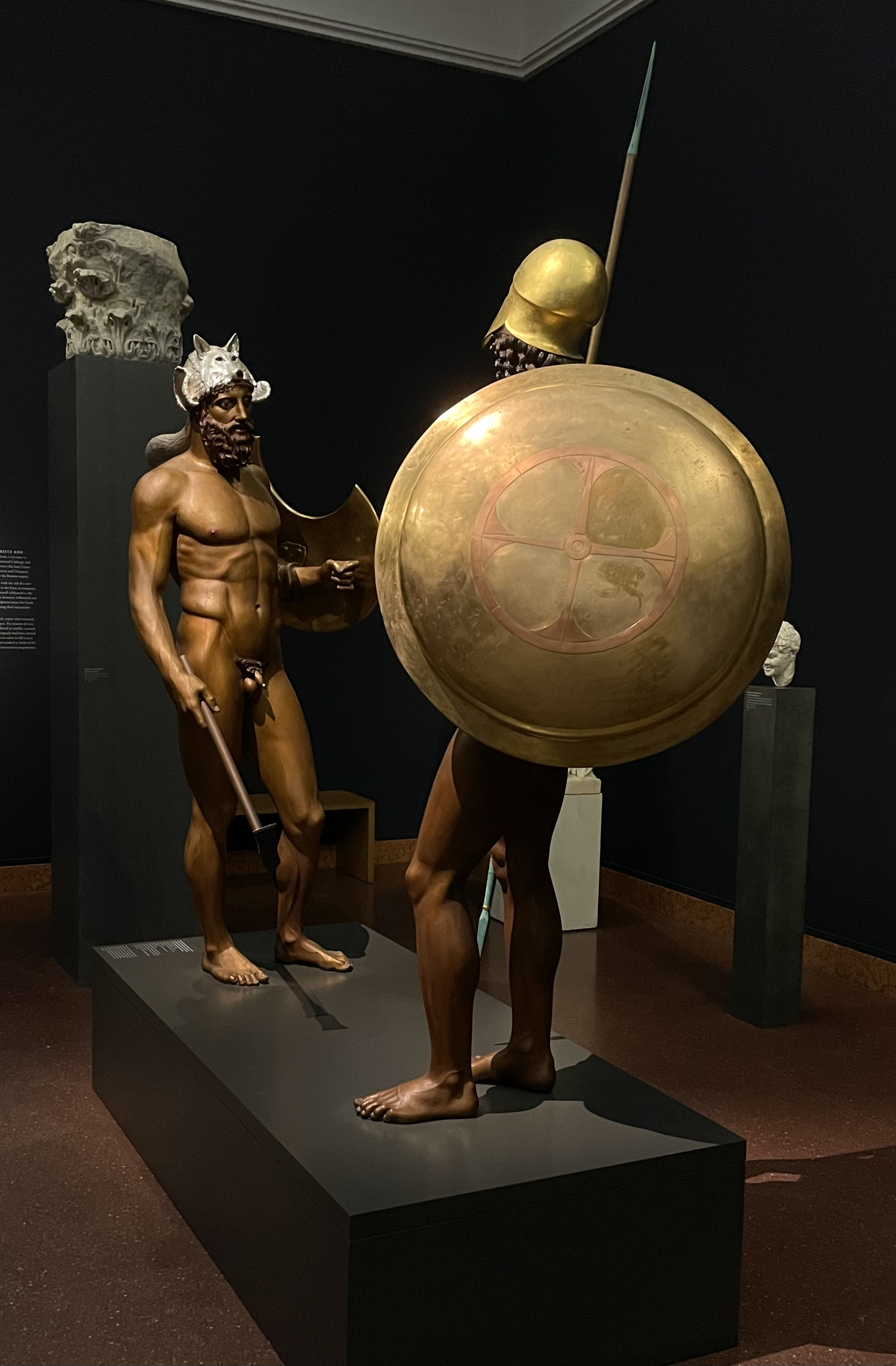
Experimental Reconstruction of the Riace bronzes, Liebieghaus Frankfurt

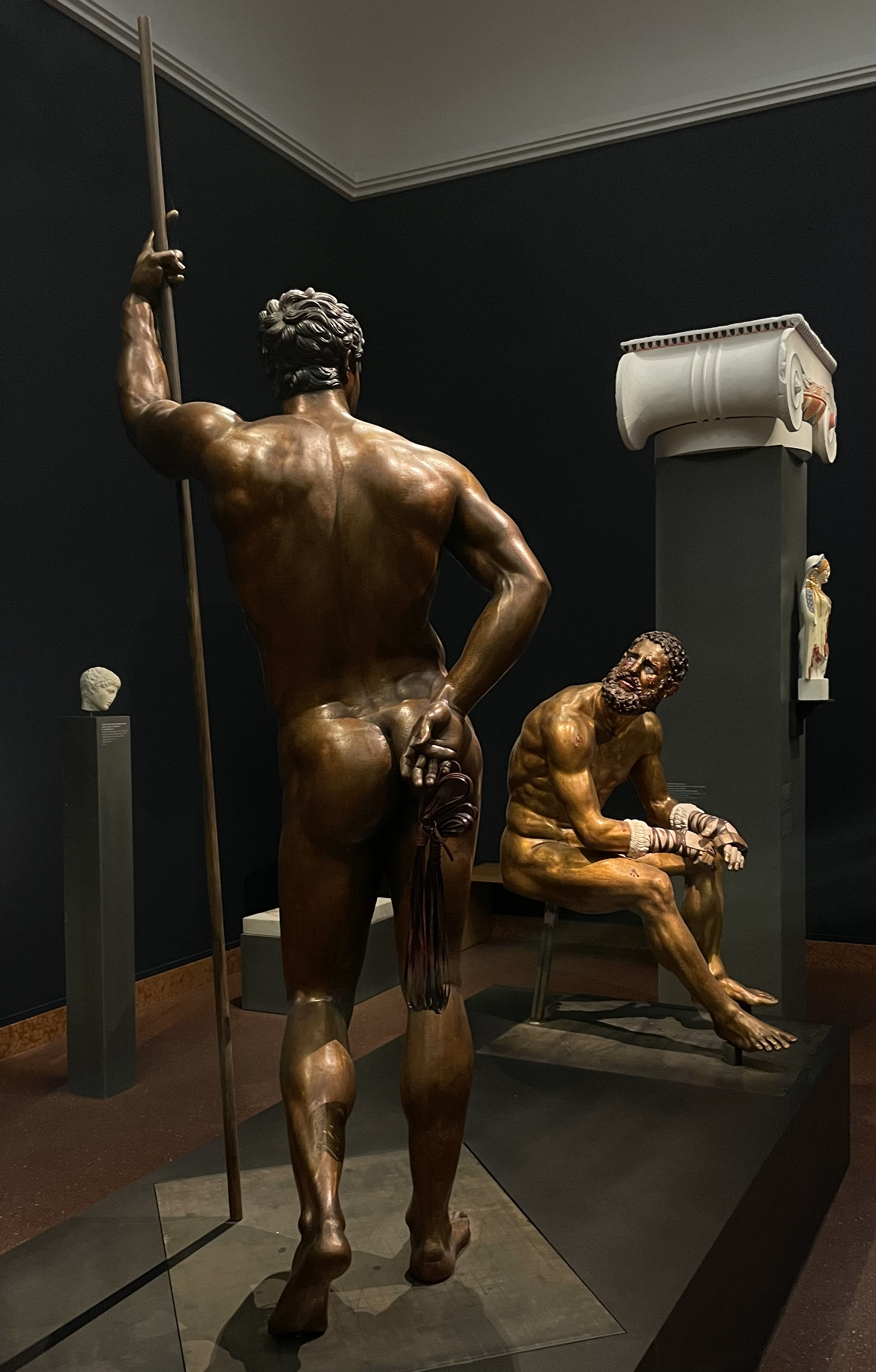
Experimental color reconstruction of the two bronzes from the Quirinal hill in Rome, Liebieghaus Frankfurt

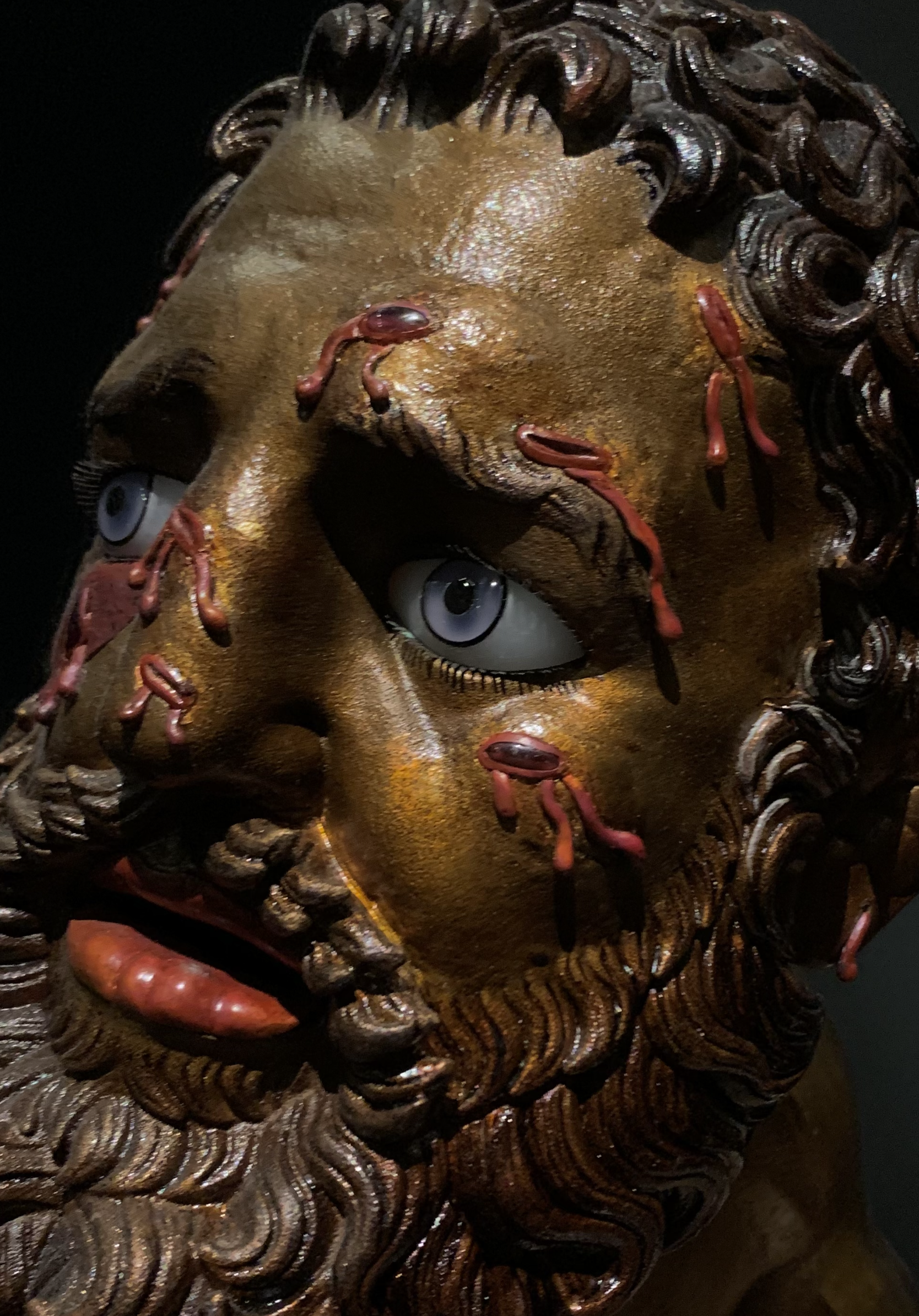
Experimental color reconstruction of the bronze statue called Boxer at Rest from the Quirinal hill in Rome, detail head, Liebieghaus Frankfurt

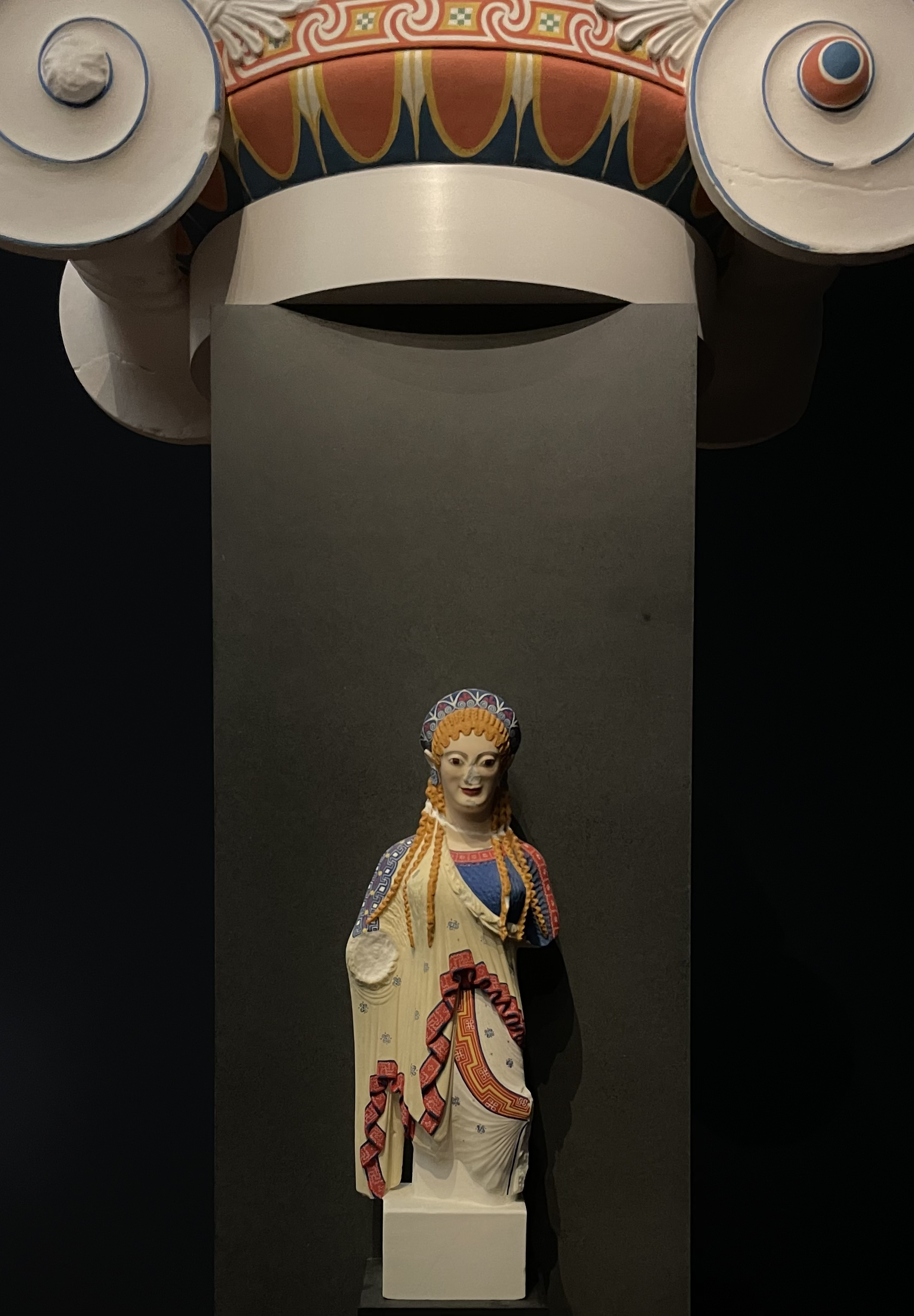
Experimental color reconstruction of so-called Chios kore from the Athenian Acropolis and capital from Athens Agora, Liebieghaus Frankfurt

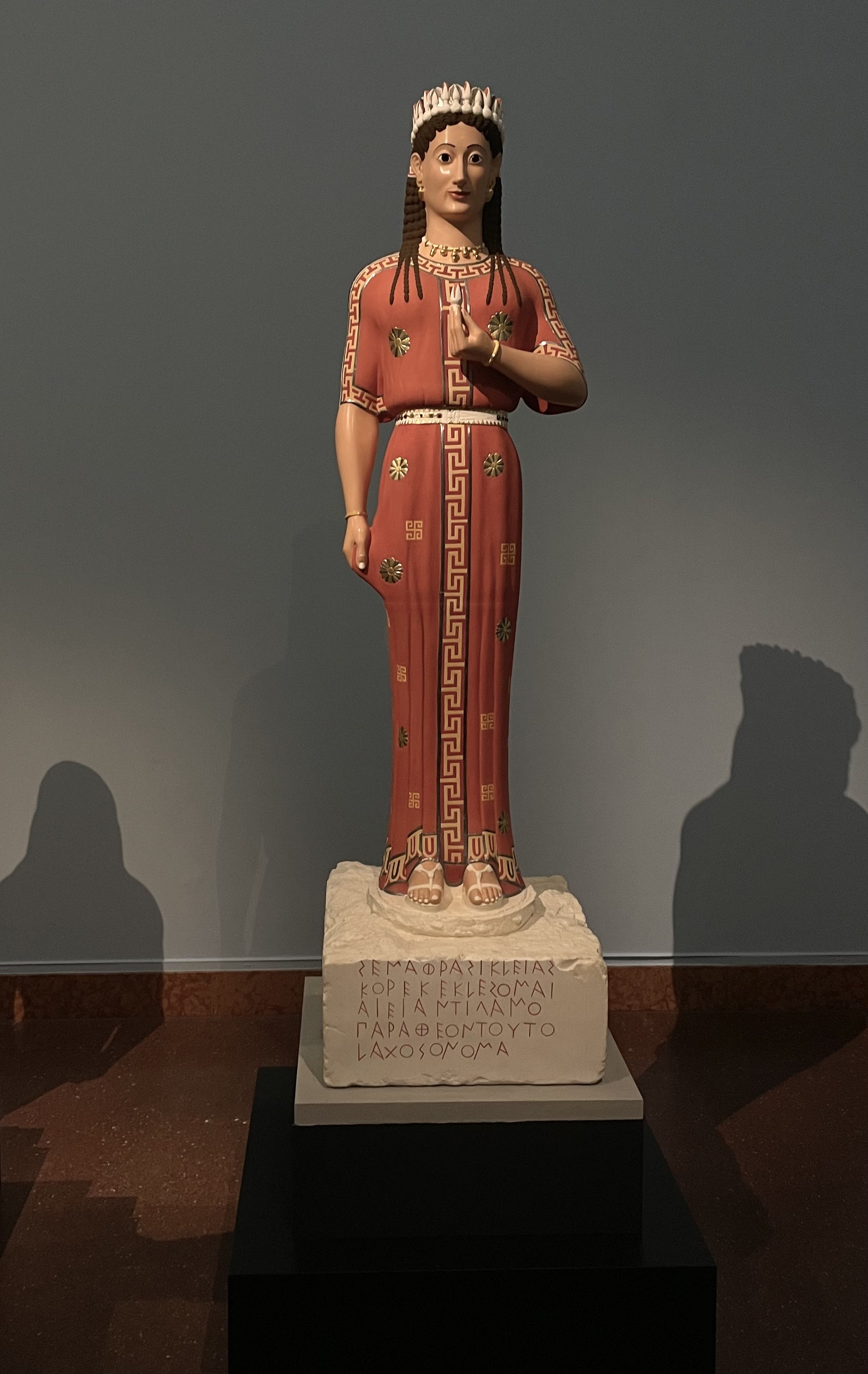
Experimental color reconstruction of the Greek grave statue of Phrasikleia, Liebieghaus Frankfurt

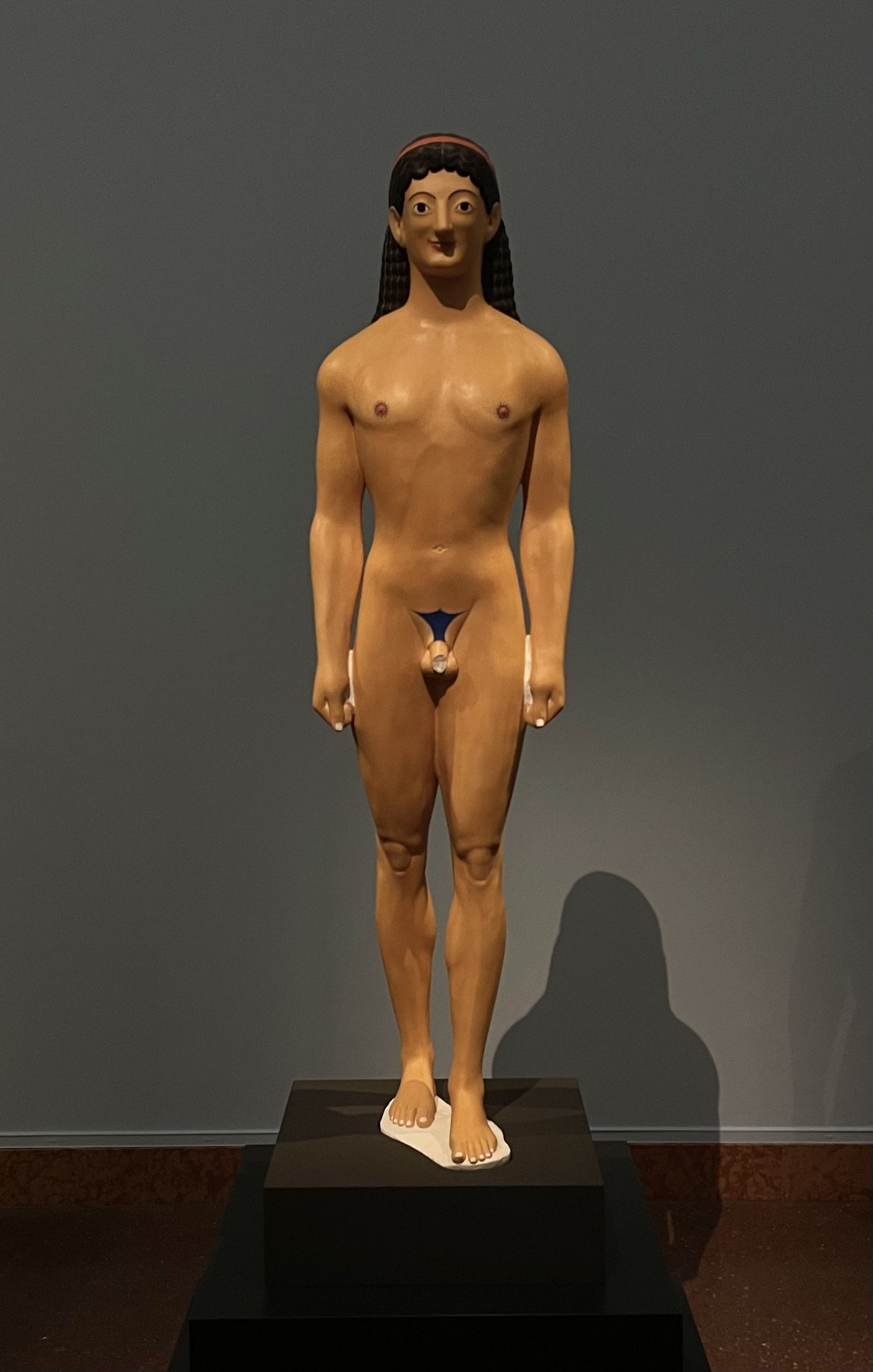
Experimental color reconstruction of the Kouros of Tenea, Frankfurt Liebieghaus

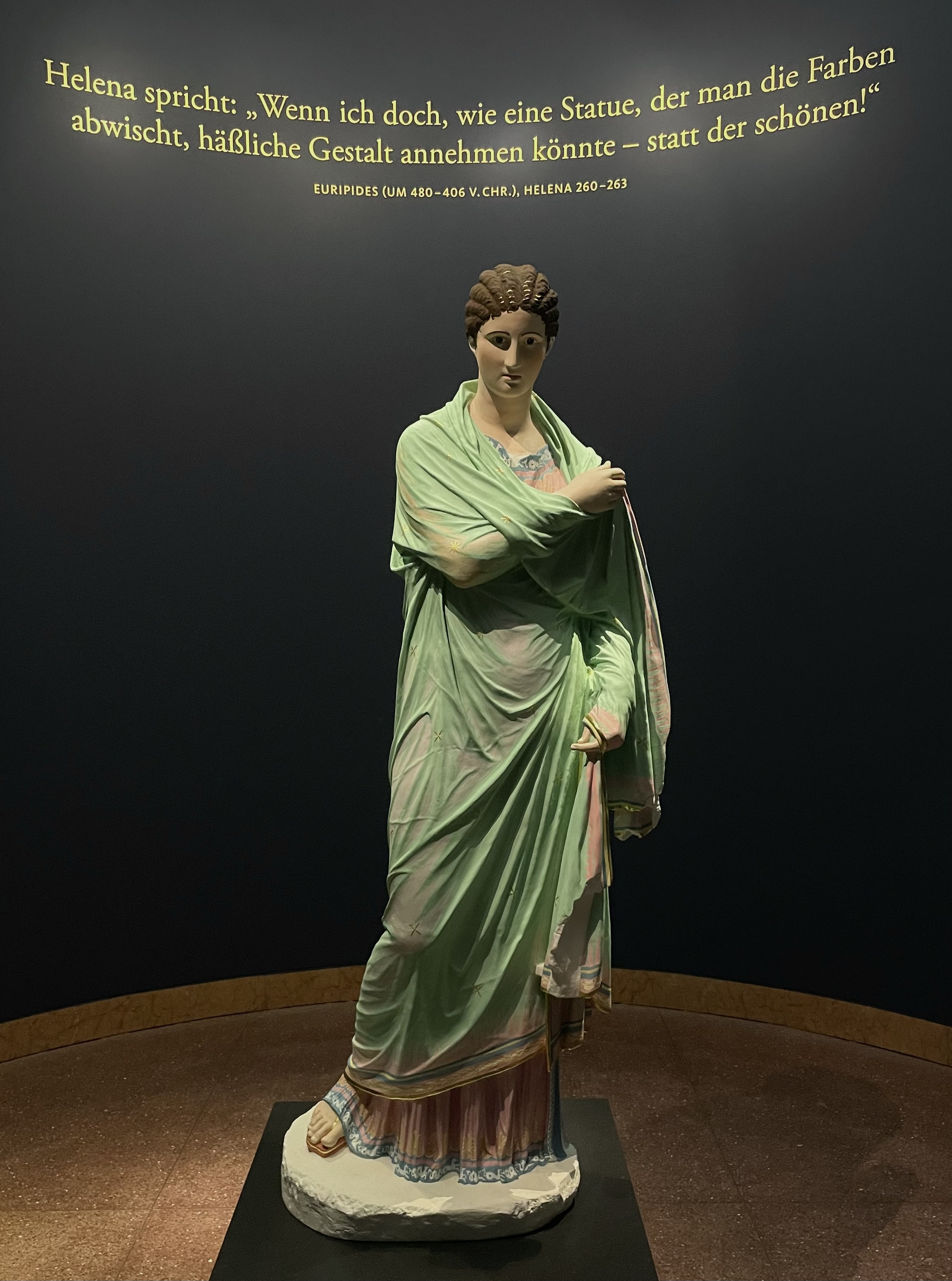
Experimental color reconstruction of the so-called Small Herculaneum Woman, Frankfurt Liebieghaus

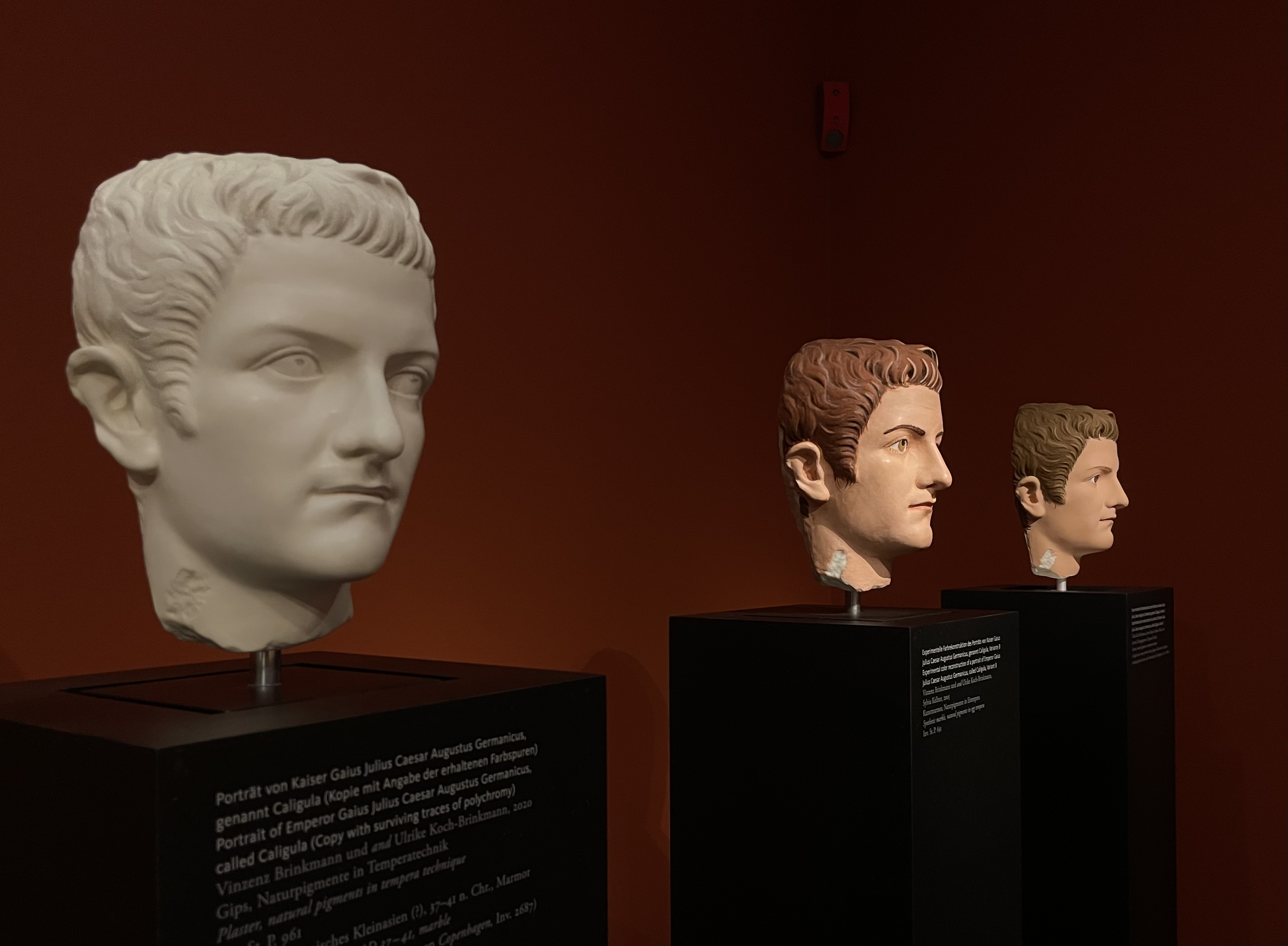
Experimental color reconstructions of the marble portrait of Roman emperor Caligula in the Ny Carlsberg Glyptotek, Liebieghaus Frankfurt

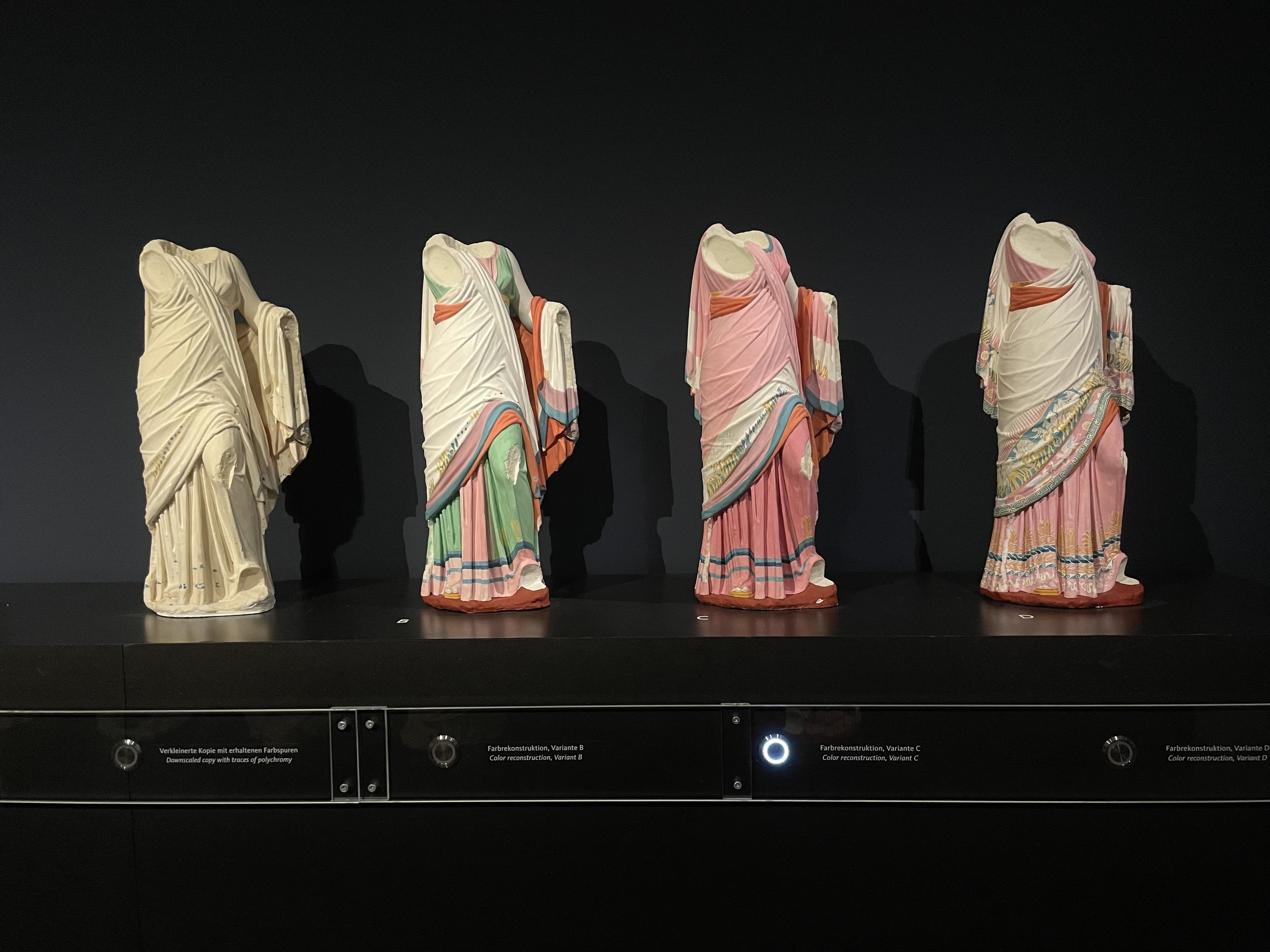
Experimental color reconstructions of the marble statue of a Greek Muse in the Frankfurt Liebieghaus

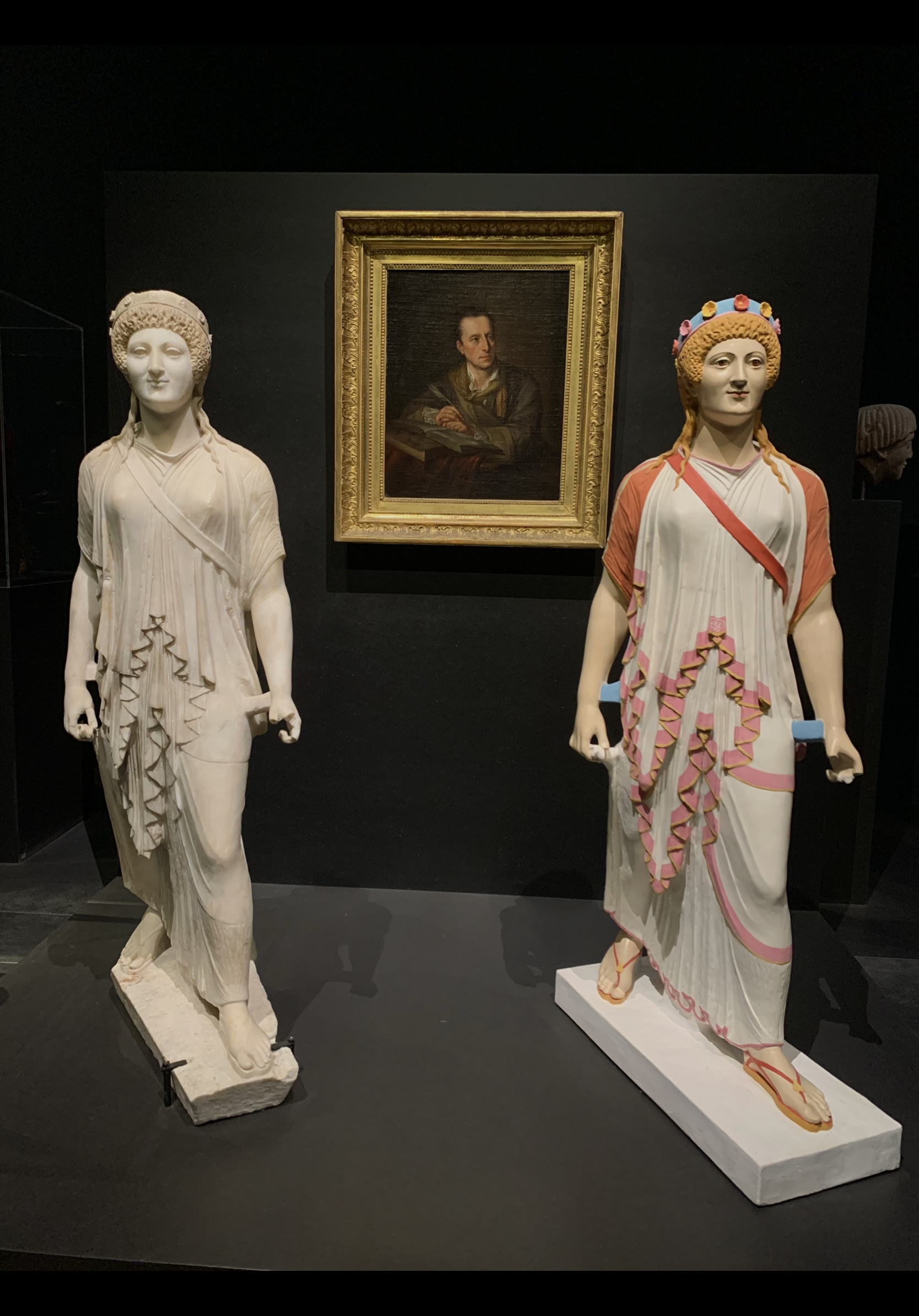
Experimental color reconstruction of the so-called Winckelmann-Artemis from Pompeii next to the original marble statue, Frankfurt Liebieghaus

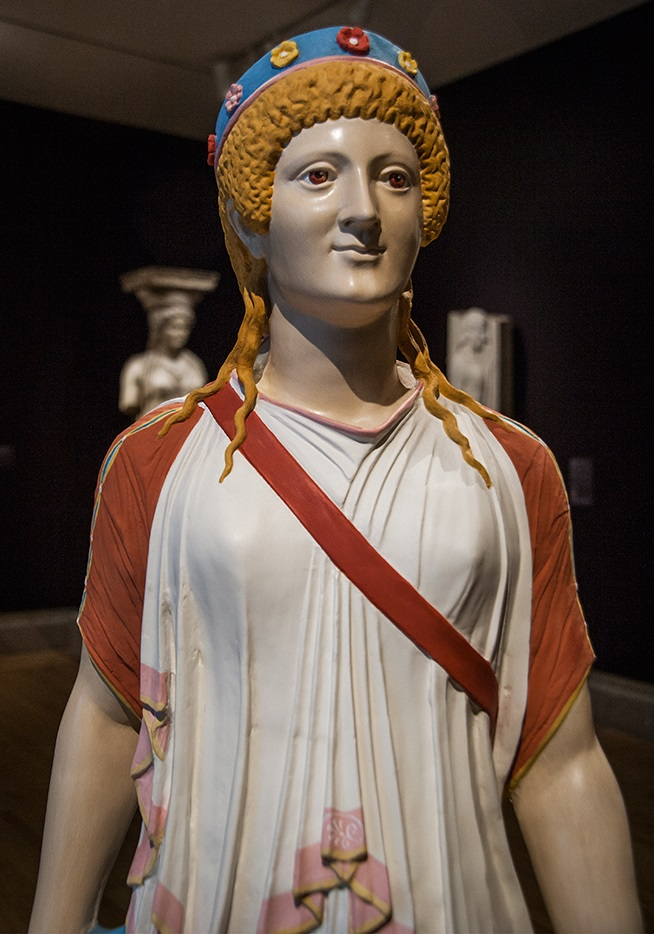
The Greek goddess Artemis, color reconstruction of a first century AD statue found in Pompeii, an imitation of Greek statues of the sixth century BC, reconstructed using analysis of trace pigments

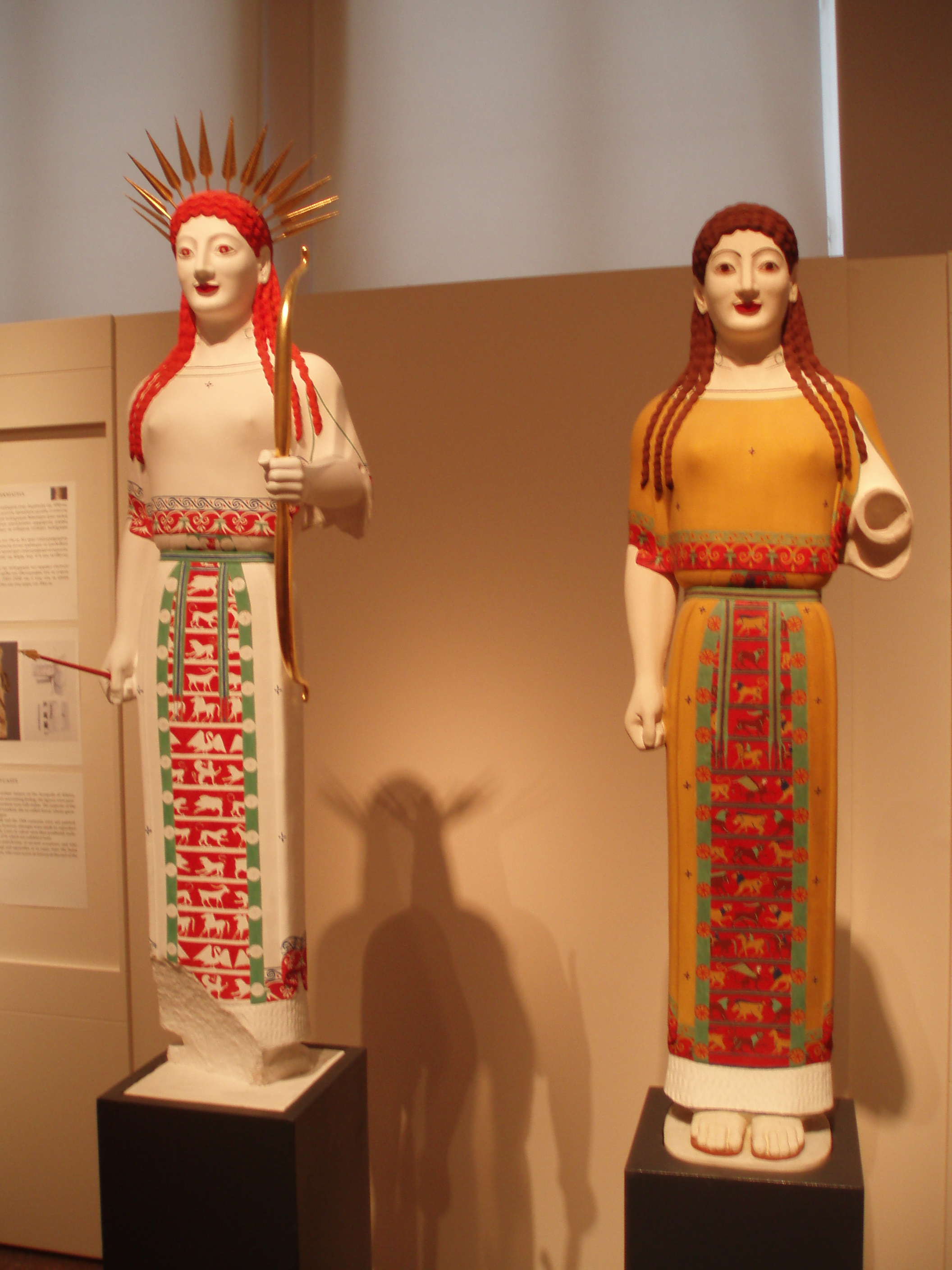
Alternative reconstructions of the Peplos Kore displayed at the Athens show

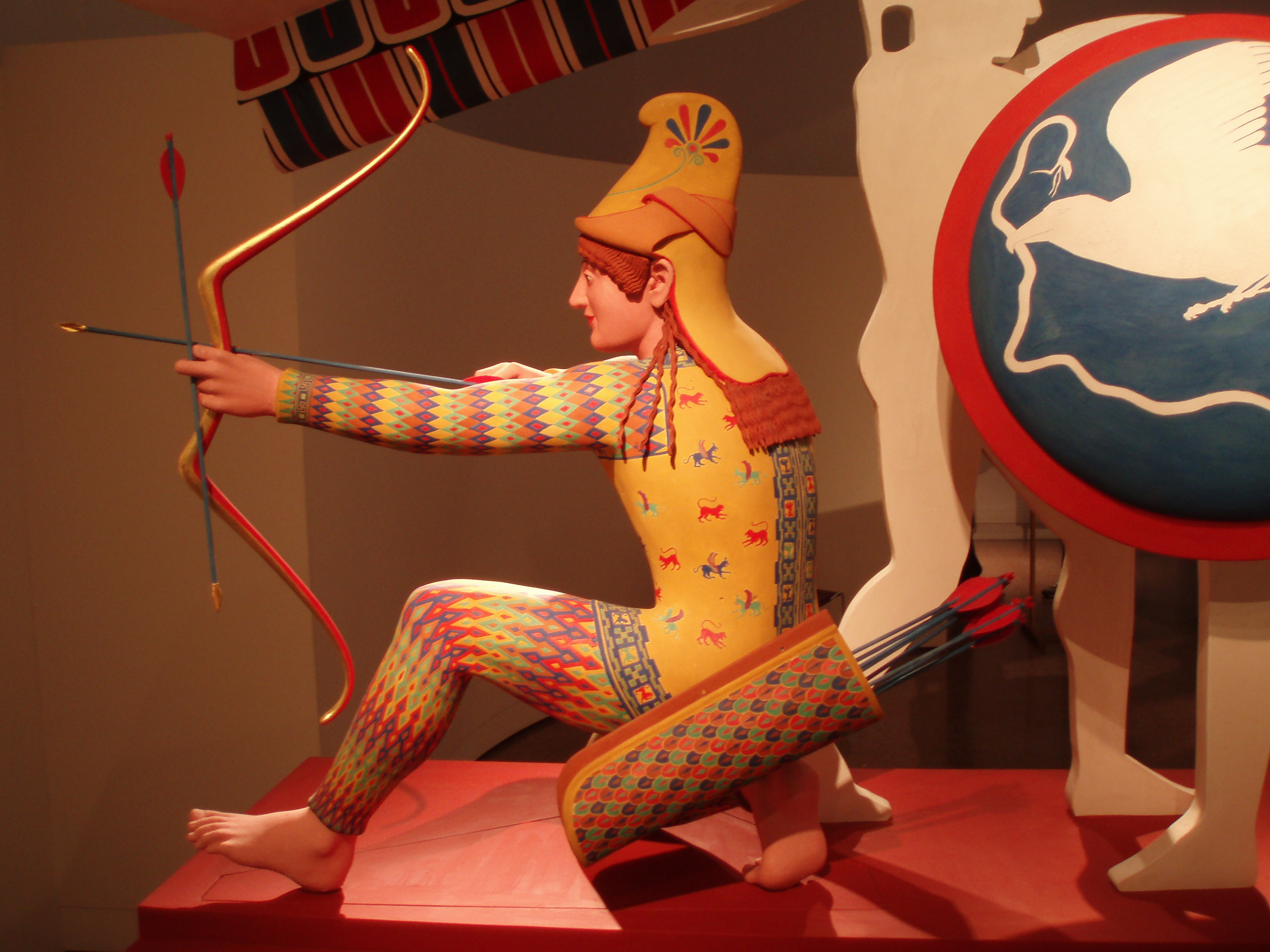
Archer from the western pediment of the Temple of Aphaia on Aigina, reconstruction, color variant A, as exhibited in Athens, perhaps depicting the Trojan prince, Paris

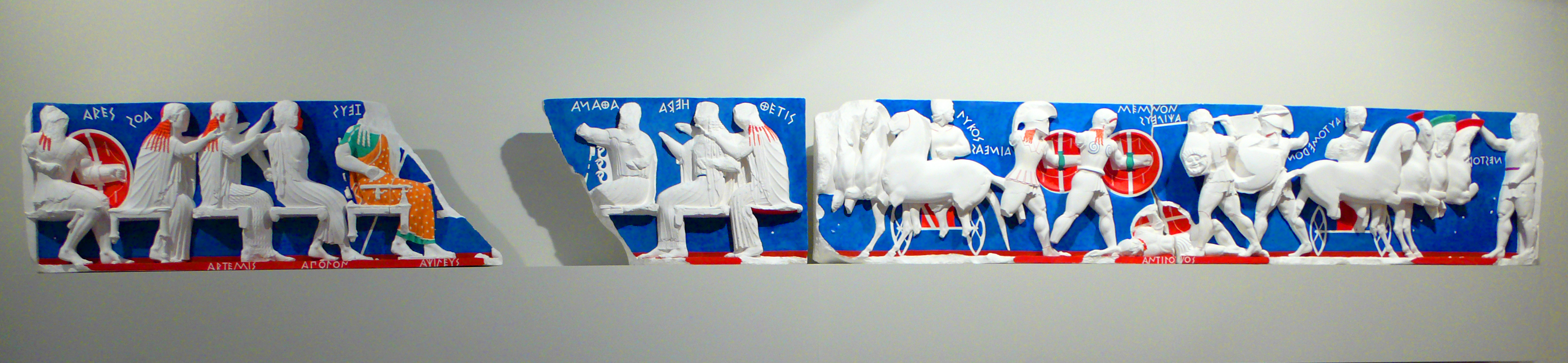
Experimental color reconstruction of the east frieze of the Siphnian Treasury in Delphi, Liebieghaus Frankfurt
