= Leonhard Romeis =

German architect of historicism

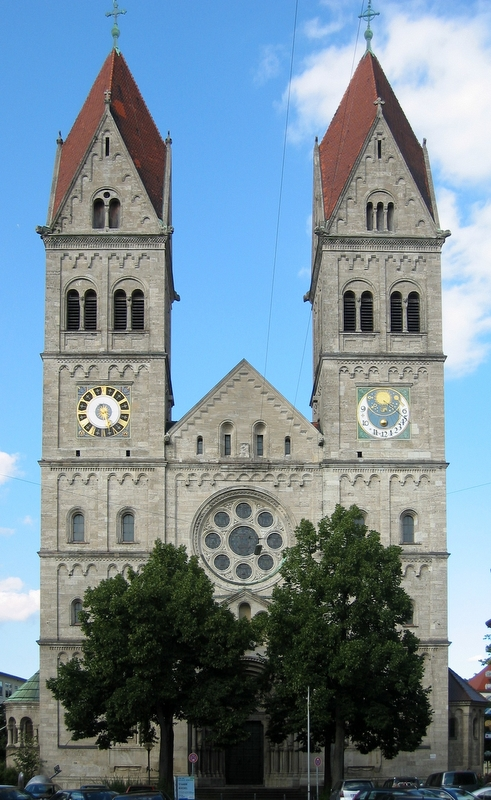
St. Benno in Munich

Leonhard Romeis (13 January 1854, in Höchstadt an der Aisch – 17 November 1904, in Munich) was a German architect of historicism.

== Life ==
Romeis was born the son of a carpenter. A charity to which the boy was sent for drawing lessons recognized his artistic talent early on. On his advice, he was sent to the Royal School of Applied Arts (Kunstgewerbeschule) in Munich. After graduation Romeis travelled to Italy. In 1886, he was appointed professor at the Munich School of Applied Arts. In the same year he married the Bamberg merchant's daughter Anna Ramis, with whom he had five children. His 1888 born eldest son Benno Romeis worked as an anatomist at the Ludwig-Maximilians-Universität München. Leonhard Romeis died of acute kidney disease on 17 November 1904 at the age of 50.

== Work ==
Between 1886 and 1904 he designed numerous villas for artists and publicists in Munich, including the houses for Anton Heß, the genre painter Eduard von Grützner, the publisher Georg Hirth and the brewer Joseph Schülein. He also planned the Richard-Wagner-Straße street with the Royal School of Applied Arts (Female Department) and the apartment building at Schackstraße 2.

His most outstanding creative achievement is the construction of the parish church St. Benno in Munich. Today it is considered one of the most important artistic examples of Neo-Romanesque sacral architecture in southern Germany. Another Romeis church was built in Fremdingen. Another prominent building by Romeis is the Villa Liebieg in Frankfurt-Sachsenhausen, the later museum "Liebieghaus". Romeis was also active in Bamberg, where he designed the "Tivoli Castle" in Pödeldorfer Strasse.

His planned country house, Aribostrasse 1, in Rottach-Egern (Egern district), which was completed in 1905, is also entered on the list of protected monuments.
