= Joseph Schülein =

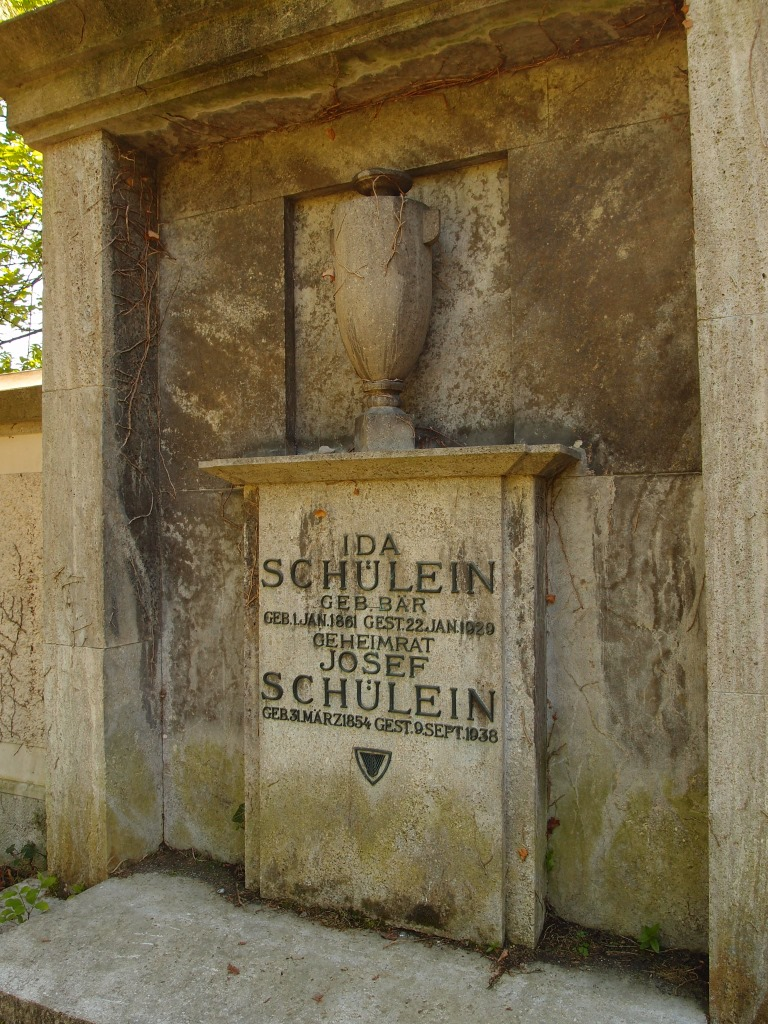
Tomb of Josef Schülein at the New Israelite Cemetery in Munich

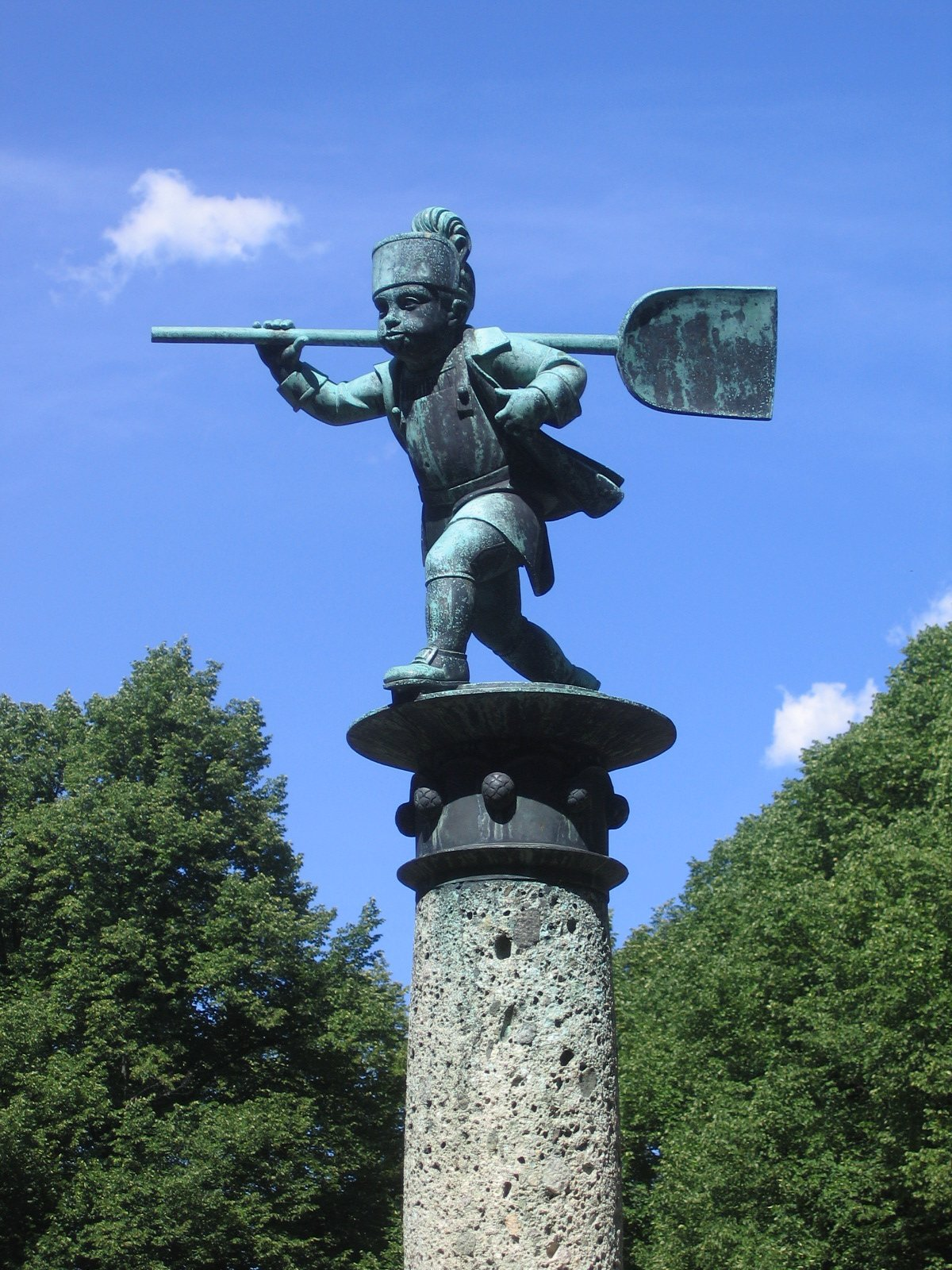
"Malt boy" on the Schüleinbrunnen in Berg am Laim, Munich

Joseph Schülein (31 March 1854 in Thalmässing – 9 September 1938 at castle Kaltenberg, Geltendorf) was a German brewery owner and philanthropist.

== Life ==
The son of a Franconian family, he first worked as a banker in Munich before he and his brother Julius bought out the bankrupt brewery "Fügerbräu" in the Äußere Wiener Straße in Haidhausen, today's Einsteinstraße, and founded the "Unionsbrauerei Schülein & Cie." in 1895. The rapidly growing company was transformed into a stock corporation in 1903. The takeover of the Münchner-Kindl-Brauerei in 1905 brought many inns into the possession of the company, including the Munich-Kindl-Keller in Haidhausen with 6,000 seats. In January 1921, the Unionsbräu and Löwenbräu joint stock breweries merged retroactively to 1 October 1919. Schülein's son Hermann Schülein played a decisive role in the merger and from 1924 was general manager of the new company, which operated under the more well-known name Löwenbräu. At the end of 1921, the company merged with the Bürgerliches Brauhaus München.

Towards the end of the First World War, Schülein acquired castle Kaltenberg with the brewery, agricultural estate and peat cutting in Emming founded in 1870, which he operated together with his youngest son Dr. Fritz Schülein. Through land foundations, Schülein made it possible to build a settlement with social housing on today's Schüleinplatz in Berg am Laim. His diverse social commitment also included the annual sponsorship of 30 to 40 confirmands, which he had newly dressed and entertained.

Schülein was married to Ida Baer († 1929), with whom he had six children. In 1902 the family moved into a prestigious residential building built by Leonhard Romeis at 7 Richard-Wagner-Straße, and Schülein later gave his daughter Elsa another plot of land in the same street as a dowry, thus enabling his son-in-law, the surgeon Alfred Haas, to build a private clinic at number 19.

As a Jew he came into the line of fire of German anti-Semitism, and there was agitation against his "Jewish beer". Schülein gave up his position on the supervisory board of Löwenbräu in 1933, and retired to his Kaltenberg estate, where he died on September 9, 1938. He was buried at the New Israelite Cemetery in the north of Munich.

Five of his children had already emigrated with their families in 1938, including his son Hermann, who had become manager in the Liebmann Breweries in New York.

The youngest son Fritz was arrested on the evening of the Reichspogrom Night in Kaltenberg and was able to flee to the US after a "protective custody" in the Dachau concentration camp; the Kaltenberg Castle family estate was "aryanised" and only returned in 1949.

== Honors ==
In Berg am Laim, a district in Munich, a small street and a square (where the Schülein fountain, donated in 1928, is located) were named after Schülein. Schüleinstraße and Schüleinplatz were renamed into Halserspitzstraße and Halserspitzplatz by the Nazi rulers. On August 7, 1945 the original names were re-established.

== Bibliography (in German) ==
- Elisabeth Schinagl: "Der Bierkönig von München". Allitera Verlag 2021, ISBN 978-3-96233-312-6.
- Lilian Harlander: "Von den Münchner Bieren kommt hauptsächlich nur Löwenbräu in Frage". Die Familie Schülein im Münchner Braugewerbe. In: Lilian Harlander, Bernhard Purin (Hrsg.): Bier ist der Wein dieses Landes. Jüdische Braugeschichten, Volk Verlag, München 2016, ISBN 978-3-86222-211-7, S. 139–189.
- Alexander Kluy: Jüdisches München. Mandelbaum, Wien 2009, ISBN 978-385476-314-7.
- Jutta Ostendorf: Die Richard-Wagner-Straße in München. Die Häuser und ihre Geschichten. Volk, München 2007, ISBN 3-937200-37-1.
