= Vinzenz Brinkmann =

German classical archaeologist (born 1958)

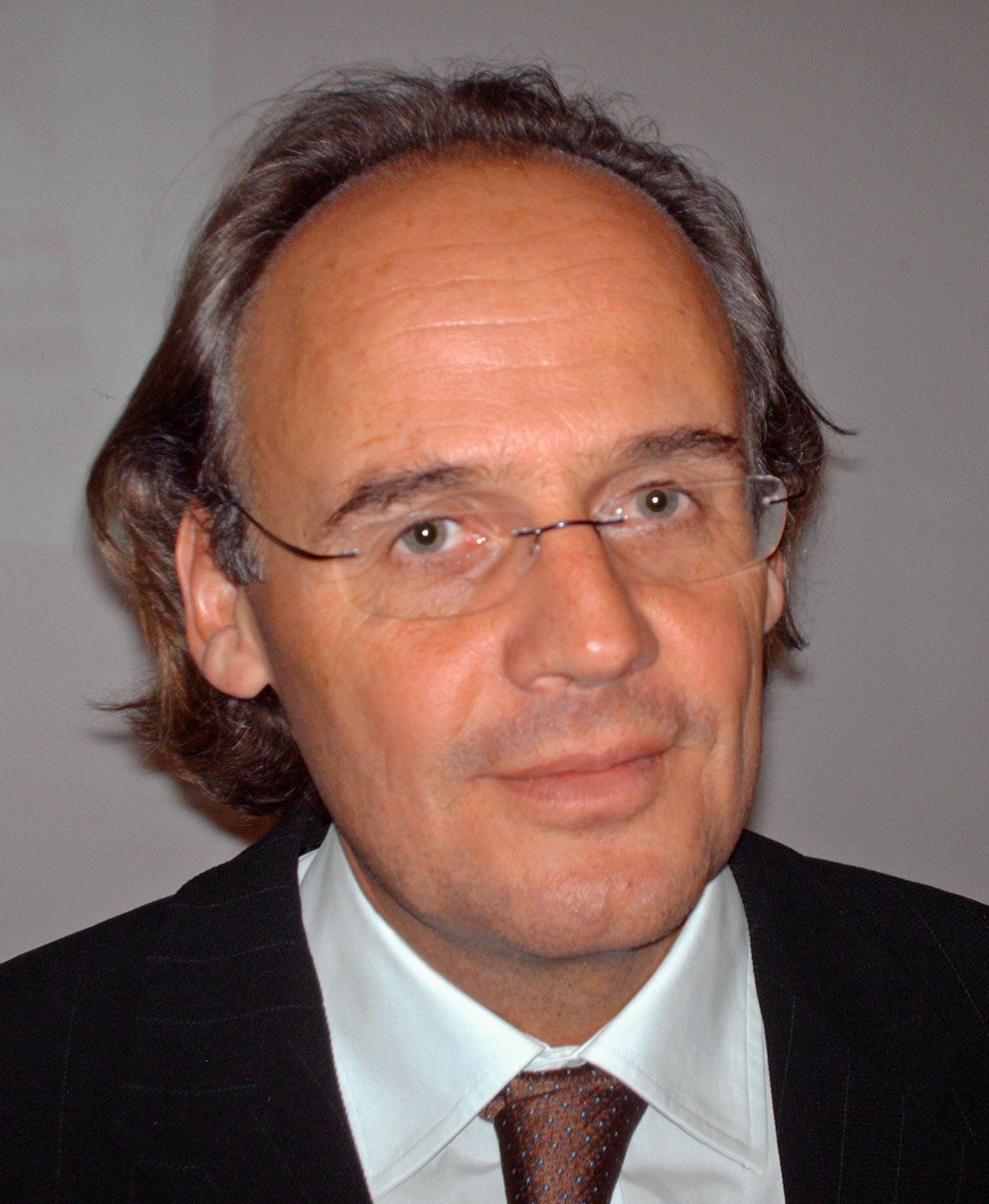
- Brinkmann in 2008
- Born: 1958 (age 67–68); Göttingen, Lower Saxony, Germany

Vinzenz Brinkmann (born 1958) is a German classical archaeologist.

== Life ==
Brinkmann grew up in Gauting, southwest of Munich, and studied Classical Archeology in Munich and Athens. In 1987 he earned his doctorate under Volkmar von Graeve at LMU Munich with his work "Observations to the Formal Structure and the Meaning of the Friezes of Siphnierschatzhauses". He worked as a curator at the State Collection of Antiquities and the Glyptothek in Munich, and finished his habilitation in Bochum in 2001. Since 2007 he has headed the antiquities collection of the Liebieghaus sculpture collection in Frankfurt and continues to teach at the Institute of Archaeological Sciences at the University of Bochum. He was a board member of the Archaeology Foundation in Munich.

He co-developed the archaeological database project Projekt Dyabola with Ralf Biering.

The results of the research work on ancient polychromy, which he is working on together with his wife Ulrike Koch-Brinkmann, were presented – often in the context of the traveling exhibition Gods in Color – at various locations (Glyptothek Munich, Liebieghaus Skulpturensammlung Frankfurt, Vatican Museums Rome, Ny Carlsberg Glyptotek Copenhagen, National Archaeological Museum, Athens, Istanbul Archaeological Museums, Fine Arts Museums of San Francisco, Palacio de Bellas Artes Mexico City, Harvard Art Museums, Oxford, The Metropolitan Museum of Art New York, Göttingen, Heidelberg, Tübingen and many others).

In 2009, Brinkmann and Greek archaeologist Chryssoula Saatsoglu-Piliadeli planned to restore the original color of the grave fries on tumulus of the Macedonian king Philip II, the father of Alexander the Great. The first version of the reconstruction work was completed in 2013 for two exhibitions: "Back to Klassik: Liebieghaus Sculpture Collection" in Frankfurt, and "Alexander the Great" in Lokschuppen Rosenheim.

The Italian authorities enabled Vinzenz Brinkmann and Ulrike Koch-Brinkmann to examine four important Greek bronze sculptures: the so-called Boxer at Rest, the so-called Hellenistic Prince and the two Riace bronzes, to reproduce them in original materials and to reconstruct their original coloration starting in 2012. In the course of this research, new interpretations of the figures were developed.

Since 2018 Vinzenz Brinkmann is member of the Wissenschaftliche Gesellschaft an der Johann Wolfgang Goethe-Universität, Frankfurt am Main.

== Exhibitions (selection) ==
- Bunte Götter. Die Farbigkeit antiker Skulptur (16 December 2003 – 29 February 2004, Glyptothek, Munich)
- in collaboration with Joachim Pissarro: Jeff Koons. The Sculptor (20 June – 20 September 2012, Liebieghaus Skulpturensammlung, Frankfurt am Main)
- William Kentridge. O sentimental machine (22 March – 6 August 2018, Liebieghaus Skulpturensammlung, Frankfurt am Main)
- Machine Room of the Gods. How Our Future Was Invented (8 March – 10 September 2023, Liebieghaus Skulpturensammlung, Frankfurt am Main)

== Publications (selection) ==
- Beobachtungen zum formalen Aufbau und zum Sinngehalt der Friese des Siphnierschatzhauses (= Studien zur antiken Malerei und Farbgebung. Vol. 1). Munich 1994.
- Die Polychromie der archaischen und frühklassischen Skulptur (= Studien zur antiken Malerei und Farbgebung. Vol. 5). Munich 2003.

As (co)editor

- Bunte Götter. Die Farbigkeit antiker Skulptur. Exhibition catalog Liebieghaus Skulpturensammlung, Frankfurt 2008.
- Sahure. Tod und Leben eines großen Pharao. Exhibition catalog Liebieghaus Skulpturensammlung, Frankfurt 2010.
- with Oliver Primavesi, Max Hollein: Circumlitio. The Polychromy of Antique and Medieval Sculpture. Munich 2010.
- with Matthias Ulrich, Joachim Pissarro, Max Hollein: Jeff Koons: The Sculptor. Exhibition catalog Liebieghaus Skulpturensammlung, Frankfurt 2012.
- Zurück zur Klassik. Ein neuer Blick auf das alte Griechenland. Exhibition catalog Liebieghaus Skulpturensammlung, Frankfurt 2013.
- Athen. Triumph der Bilder. Exhibition catalog Liebieghaus Skulpturensammlung, Frankfurt 2016.
- with Kirstin Schrader: William Kentridge. O Sentimental Machine. Exhibition catalog Liebieghaus Skulpturensammlung, Frankfurt 2018.
- with Miguel Fernández Félix et al.: El Color de los dioses. Policromía en la Antigüedad clásica y Mesoamérica. Exhibition catalog Museo del Palacio de Bellas Artes, Mexiko-City 2016.
- with Renée Dreyfus, Ulrike Koch-Brinkmann: Gods in Color. Polychromy in the Ancient World. Exhibition catalog Legion of Honor, San Francisco 2017.
- Medeas Liebe und die Jagd nach dem Goldenen Vlies. Exhibition catalog Liebieghaus Skulpturensammlung, Frankfurt 2018.
- with Ulrike Koch-Brinkmann: Bunte Götter – Golden Edition. Die Farben der Antike. Exhibition catalog Liebieghaus Skulpturensammlung, Frankfurt 2020.
- Machine Room of the Gods. How Our Future Was Invented. Exhibition catalog Liebieghaus Skulpturensammlung, Frankfurt 2023.
