= Thalmässing =

- Municipality
- Coat of arms

- Location of Thalmässing within Roth district
- Interactive map of Thalmässing
- Location within Germany Location within Bavaria
- Coordinates: 49°5′N 11°13′E
- Country: Germany
- State: Bavaria
- Admin. region: Mittelfranken
- District: Roth
- Subdivisions: 38 districts

Government
  - Mayor (2023–29): Johannes Mailinger (CSU)

Area
  - Total: 80.57 km^{2} (31.11 sq mi)
- Elevation: 418 m (1,371 ft)

Population (2025-12-31)
  - Total: 5,233
  - Density: 64.95/km^{2} (168.2/sq mi)
- Time zone: UTC+01:00 (CET)
  - Summer (DST): UTC+02:00 (CEST)
- Postal codes: 91177
- Dialling codes: 09173
- Vehicle registration: RH
- Website: www.thalmaessing.de

Thalmässing is a municipality in the district of Roth, in Bavaria, Germany.

== Personalities ==
- Argula von Grumbach (Stauff) (1492–1544), author of important reformatory pamphlets
- Joseph Schülein (1854–1938), founder of the brewery Löwenbräu AG 1921
- Katharina Storck-Duvenbeck (born 1968), German author
