= Philipp Demandt =

German art historian and museu director (born 1971)

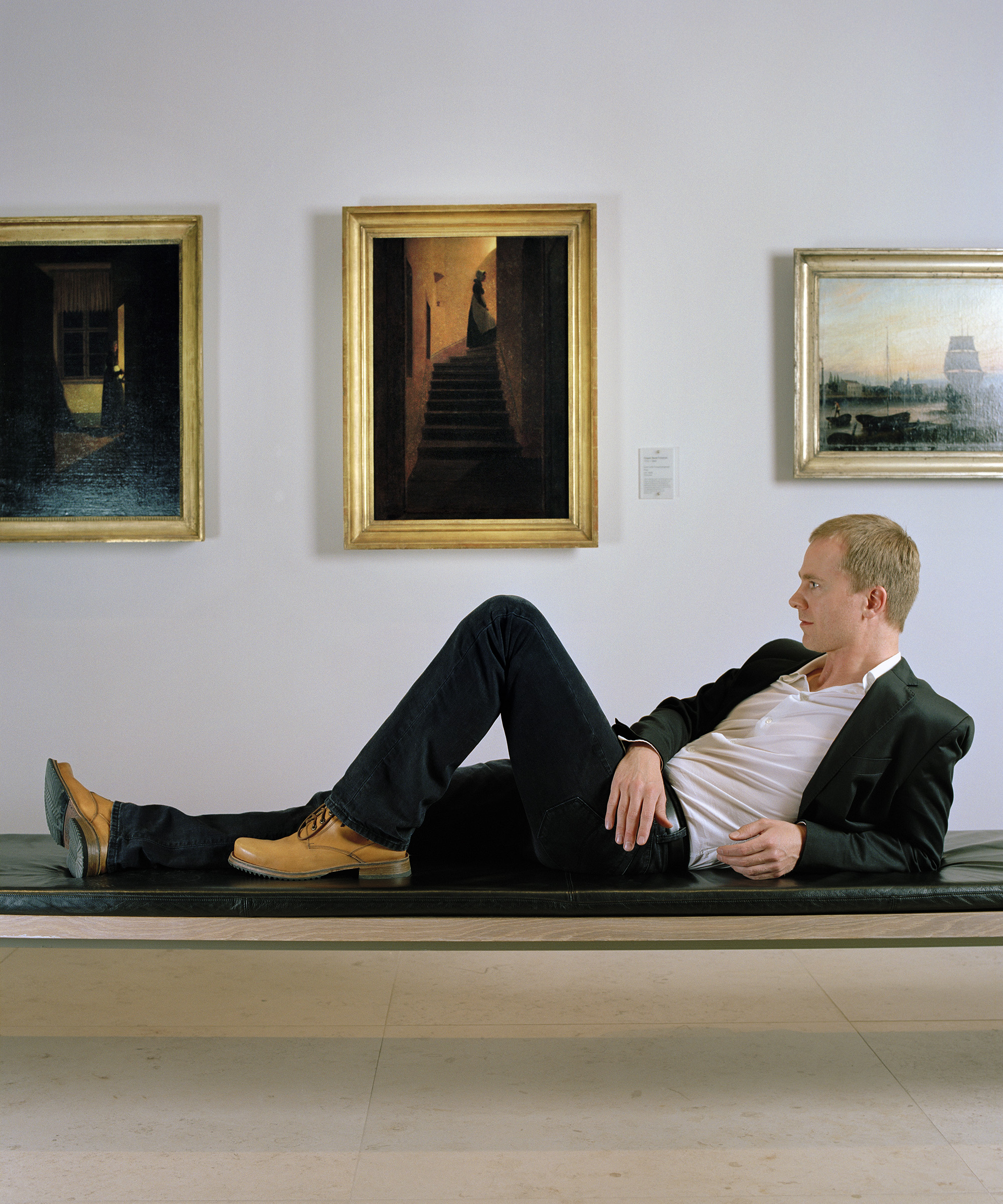
Philipp Demandt photographed by Oliver Mark at the Pomeranian State Museum in front of Caspar David Friedrich's Woman Ascending towards the Light, Greifswald 2008

Philipp Demandt (born 1971 in Konstanz) is a German art historian and director of the Städel Museum and the Liebieghaus sculpture collection in Frankfurt am Main.

== Life ==
Philipp Demandt is the son of the ancient historian Alexander Demandt and grandson of the Hessian state historian Karl Ernst Demandt. Due to his father's appointment as a professor of ancient history at the Friedrich Meinecke Institute of the Free University of Berlin, the family moved to West Berlin in 1975. Philipp Demandt studied art history, classical archaeology, and communication studies, completing his studies in 2001 at the Institute for History and Cultural Studies of the Free University of Berlin with a doctorate on The Historical Mythology of the Prussian State Reflected in the "Luise Cult".

After an initial professional position as an exhibition assistant at the Berlin Bröhan Museum, he worked from 2004 as a curator at the Cultural Foundation of the German States. His work included supporting German museums in acquiring artworks from the 17th to 19th centuries. Additionally, he led the foundation's magazine Arsprototo and the scientific publication series Patrimonia.

Demandt has published numerous articles on art and cultural history in newspapers such as the Frankfurter Allgemeine Zeitung, Süddeutsche Zeitung, and Die Welt. His work focuses on topics of the 19th century. After publishing on the Prussian Queen Luise in 2003, he worked from 2007 to 2010 as a scientific advisor and co-curator on the exhibition Luise. Life and Myth of the Queen. This exhibition, organized by the Prussian Palaces and Gardens Foundation Berlin-Brandenburg, took place in 2010 at Charlottenburg Palace in Berlin. Demandt led the Alte Nationalgalerie in Berlin starting from January 2012. He succeeded Bernhard Maaz, who became the director of the Gemäldegalerie Alte Meister and the Kupferstich-Kabinett in Dresden.

Since 1 October 2016, Philipp Demandt has been the director of the Städel Museum and the Liebieghaus sculpture collection, succeeding Max Hollein. From October 2016 to June 2022, Demandt also led the Schirn Kunsthalle in Frankfurt am Main. In September 2021, it was announced that he would extend his tenure as director of the Städel Museum and the Liebieghaus until 2026, while his role at the Schirn Kunsthalle would conclude at the end of June 2022 due to a strategic realignment.

== Exhibitions ==
- 2014: Rembrandt Bugatti. The Sculptor 1884–1916. Alte Nationalgalerie Berlin. Catalogue.
- 2015: The Lion-Kuhnert: Africa's Wildlife in the Drawings of Wilhelm Kuhnert. Catalogue.

== Publications ==
- Co-editor: Rembrandt Bugatti. The Sculptor 1884–1916. Hirmer, Munich 2014, ISBN 978-3-7774-2186-5.
- Editor: The Lion-Kuhnert: Africa's Wildlife in the Drawings of Wilhelm Kuhnert. Nicolai, Berlin 2015, ISBN 978-3-89479-976-2.
