= Master of the Furies =

Ivory sculptor

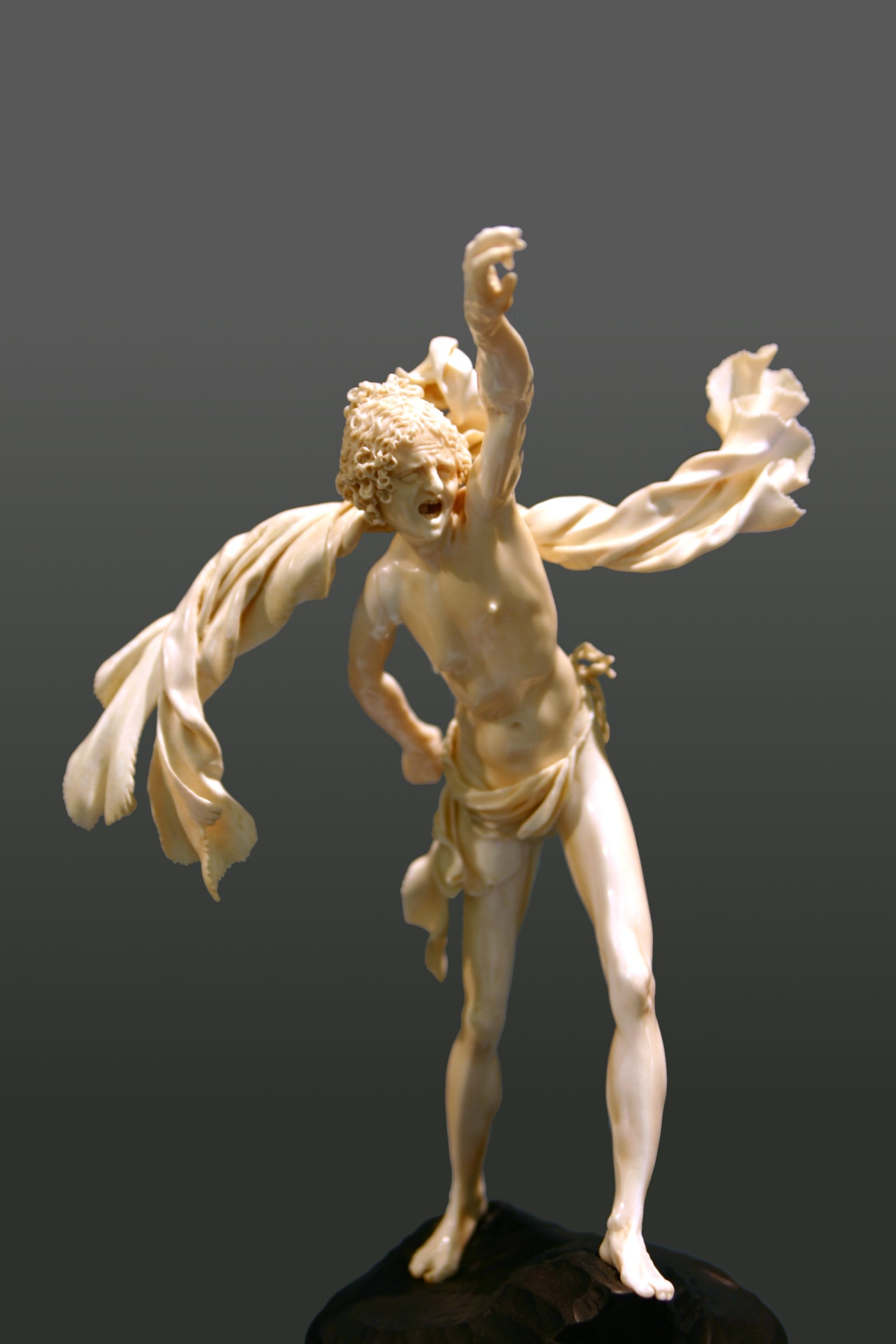
"Furie", c. 1610

Master of the Furies is the provisional name of an ivory sculptor working in the early 17th century. He was from Austria, and most probably Salzburg. The name is derived from their characteristic work, showing shouting furies, in the Kunsthistorisches Museum Vienna. All their works are without any signature. The earliest record of their works are found in an inventory of Maria Magdalena of Austria.
