= List of museums in Germany =

This is a list of museums and galleries in Germany.

== Bavaria ==
=== Augsburg ===
- Augsburg Puppet Theater museum
- Augsburg Railway Park
- Fuggerei museum
- German Ice Hockey Hall of Fame

=== Bayreuth ===
- Kunstmuseum Bayreuth

=== Eichstätt ===
- Jura Museum

=== Feucht ===
- Hermann Oberth Space Travel Museum

=== Kempten ===
- Alpin-Museum, largest museum in Europe of the history of the Alpes

=== Munich ===
Art museums

- Alte Pinakothek
- Bavarian National Museum
- Bavarian State Archaeological Collection
- Bavarian State Painting Collections
- Glyptothek
- Goetz Collection
- Haus der Kunst
- Lenbachhaus
- Munich Residenz
- Munich Stadtmuseum
- Museum Brandhorst
- Neue Pinakothek
- Pinakothek der Moderne
- Schackgalerie
- Staatliche Antikensammlungen
- Staatliche Sammlung für Ägyptische Kunst
- Museum Five Continents

Cultural history museums

- Marstallmuseum
- Deutsches Brauereimuseum
- Deutsches Jagd- und Fischereimuseum
- Jewish Museum Munich
- Valentin-Museum in the Isartor

Natural history museums

- Museum of Man and Nature
- Paläontologisches Museum München
- Zoologische Staatssammlung München
  - Museum Witt

Technology museums

- BMW Museum
- Deutsches Museum

=== Neuenmarkt ===
- German Steam Locomotive Museum

=== Nuremberg ===
Art museums

- Albrecht-Dürer-Haus (Albrecht Dürer's House)
- Kunsthalle Nürnberg (Gallery of Contemporary Art)
- Kunsthaus im KunstKulturQuartier (Art house at the art and culture area)
- Kunstvilla im KunstKulturQuartier (Art villa at the art and culture area)
- Neues Museum Nürnberg (Museum for Contemporary Art)

History and culture museums

- Dokumentationszentrum Reichsparteitagsgelände (Nazi Party Rally Grounds Documentation Center)
- Germanisches Nationalmuseum (German National Museum)
- Historischer Kunstbunker (World War II Art Bunker)
- Mittelalterliche Lochgefägnisse (Medieval Dungeons Nuremberg)
- Memorium Nürnberger Prozesse (Memorium Nuremberg Trials)
- Museum Tuscherschloss und Hirsvogelsaal (Museum Tucher Mansion and Hirsvogel Hall)
- Spielzeugmuseum Nürnberg (Nuremberg Toy Museum)
- Stadtmuseum Fembohaus (City Museum at Fembo House)

Science and nature museums

- DB-Museum (DB Railway Museum)
- Deutsches Museum Nürnberg (Future Museum)
- Museum Industriekultur (Museum of Industrial Culture)
- Museum für Kommunikation (Museum of Communications)
- Naturhistorisches Museum Nürnberg (Natural History Museum Nuremberg)
- Turm der Sinne (Tower of the Senses)

=== Regensburg ===
- Haus der Bayerischen Geschichte: Museum

=== Solnhofen ===
- Bürgermeister-Müller-Museum

=== Würzburg ===
- Museum im Kulturspeicher Würzburg
- Würzburg Residence

== Brandenburg ==
=== Potsdam ===
- Museum Barberini
- Sanssouci
  - Sanssouci Picture Gallery

== Bremen ==
- Gerhard Marcks House
- Kunsthalle Bremen
- Paula Modersohn-Becker Museum
- Übersee Museum Bremen
- Universum Science Center
- Weserburg (modern art)
- Wilhelm Wagenfeld House (design exhibitions)

=== Bremerhaven ===
- Deutsches Schiffahrtsmuseum
- German Emigration Center

== Hessen ==
=== Darmstadt ===
- Hessisches Landesmuseum

=== Frankfurt ===
- Caricatura Museum Frankfurt
- Frankfurter Kunstverein
- German Architecture Museum
- Goethe House
- Historic Railway, Frankfurt
- Historical Museum, Frankfurt
- Jewish Museum Frankfurt
- Liebieghaus
- Museum Angewandte Kunst
- Museum Giersch
- Museum für Kommunikation
- Museum für Moderne Kunst
- Museum der Weltkulturen
- Naturmuseum Senckenberg
- Schirn Kunsthalle Frankfurt
- Städel

=== Gießen ===
- Mathematikum
- Kunsthalle Giessen

=== Kassel ===
- Fridericianum
- Schloss Wilhelmshöhe
- Neue Gallerie
- Palais Bellevue
- Hessisches Landesmuseum
- Astronomisch-Physikalisches Kabinett
- Grimmwelt
- Naturkundemuseum
- Stadtmuseum
- Spohr Museum
- Straßenbahn Museum
- Museum für Sepulkralkultur
- Deutsches Tapetenmuseum
- documenta-Halle
- Caricatura Kassel

=== Offenbach ===
- German Leather Museum
- Klingspor Museum

=== Wiesbaden ===
- Museum Wiesbaden

== Lower Saxony ==
=== Braunschweig ===
- Dankwarderode Castle (Burg Dankwarderode; history)
- Gerstäcker-Museum (about Friedrich Gerstäcker, 1816-1872, traveler and novelist)
- Herzog Anton Ulrich Museum (paintings)
- Braunschweigisches Landesmuseum (history)
- Naturhistorisches Museum (zoology)
- Städtisches Museum (city history)

=== Einbeck ===
- PS Speicher

=== Hanover ===
- Hannoversches Straßenbahn Museum
- Historisches Museum Hannover
- kestnergesellschaft
- Kestner-Museum
- Landesmuseum Hannover
- Sprengel Museum
- Wilhelm Busch Museum

=== Hildesheim ===
- Roemer-und-Pelizaeus-Museum
- Dommuseum Hildesheim

=== Meppen ===
- Exhibition Centre for the Archaeology of the Emsland

=== Osnabrück ===
- Felix Nussbaum Haus

=== Wolfsburg ===
- Phaeno Science Center

== Mecklenburg-Western Pomerania ==
=== Anklam ===
- Otto-Lilienthal-Museum

=== Greifswald ===
- Botanical Museum Greifswald
- Pomeranian State Museum

=== Neubrandenburg ===
- Neubrandenburg Regional Museum

=== Rostock ===
- Abbey of the Holy Cross, Rostock
- Frieden (museum ship)
- Gelbensande Hunting Lodge
- Rostock Art Gallery
- Zoological Collection Rostock

=== Rügen ===
- Granitz Hunting Lodge
- Mönchgut Coastal Fishing Museum
- Rügen Railway & Technology Museum

=== Schwerin ===
- Schwerin Palace
- Staatliches Museum Schwerin
- State Museum of Technology

=== Stralsund ===
- Stralsund Museum of Cultural History
- German Oceanographic Museum
  - Ozeaneum

=== Waren (Müritz) ===
- Müritzeum

=== Others ===
- Darßer Ort Natureum
- Groß Raden Archaeological Open Air Museum
- Kranich Museum
- Ludwigslust Palace
- Malchow Abbey
- Otto Lilienthal Museum Anklam
- Peenemünde Historical-Technical Museum
- Ukranenland

== North Rhine-Westphalia ==
=== Aachen ===
- Ludwig Forum für Internationale Kunst

=== Bielefeld ===
- Kunsthalle Bielefeld

=== Bochum ===
- Bochum Dahlhausen Railway Museum
- German Mining Museum

=== Bonn ===
- Beethoven House
- Bonn Women's Museum
- Haus der Geschichte
- Kunst- und Ausstellungshalle der Bundesrepublik Deutschland
- Kunstmuseum Bonn
- Museum Koenig
- Rheinisches Landesmuseum Bonn

=== Cologne ===
Art museums

- Käthe Kollwitz Museum
- Kolumba, art museum of the Archdiocese of Cologne
- Museum of Applied Art
- Museum Ludwig
- Skulpturen Park Köln
- Wallraf-Richartz Museum

History and culture museums

- EL-DE Haus
- Fragrance Museum
- Imhoff-Schokoladenmuseum
- Romano-Germanic Museum
- Schnütgen Museum

=== Dortmund ===
- German Football Museum
- Museum für Kunst und Kulturgeschichte
- Museum Ostwall

=== Duisburg ===
- German Inland Waterways Museum
- Lehmbruck Museum
- Museum Küppersmühle

=== Düsseldorf ===
- Forum NRW
- Alte Kunsthalle
- Kunsthalle Düsseldorf
  - Kunst im Tunnel
- Kunstsammlung Nordrhein-Westfalen
- Museum Kunst Palast

=== Essen ===
- Museum Folkwang

=== Hagen ===
- Hagen Open-air Museum
- Osthaus-Museum Hagen

=== Mettmann ===
- Neanderthal Museum

=== Mönchengladbach ===
- Abteiberg Museum

=== Mülheim ===
- Museum zur Vorgeschichte des Films

=== Münster ===
- Westfälisches Museum für Naturkunde
- Westphalian State Museum of Art and Cultural History

=== Nideggen ===
- Castle Museum

=== Oberhausen ===
- LVR Industrial Museum

=== Viersen ===
- Städtische Galerie im Park Viersen

=== Wuppertal ===
- Bergische Museumsbahnen
- Knipex Museum
- Von der Heydt Museum

== Rhineland-Palatinate ==
=== Fell ===
- Fell Exhibition Slate Mine

=== Freinsheim ===
- Historic Toy Museum, Freinsheim

=== Konz ===
- Roscheider Hof Open Air Museum

=== Mainz ===
- Gutenberg Museum
- Landesmuseum Mainz
- Museum of Ancient Seafaring
- Naturhistorisches Museum (Mainz)
- Romano-Germanic Central Museum (Mainz)

=== Speyer ===
- Technikmuseum Speyer

=== Trier ===
- Rheinisches Landesmuseum Trier

== Saarland ==
=== Saarbrücken ===
- Saarland Museum

=== Völklingen ===
- Völklingen Ironworks

== Saxony ==
=== Chemnitz ===
- Gunzenhauser Museum
- Staatliches Museum für Archäologie Chemnitz
- Villa Esche includes the Henry-van-der-Velde-Museum

=== Dresden ===
- Dresden City Museum
- Dresden Transport Museum
- German Hygiene Museum
- Militärhistorisches Museum der Bundeswehr
- Staatliche Kunstsammlungen Dresden, including:
  - Dresden Armory
  - Dresden Museum of Ethnology
  - Dresden Porcelain Collection
  - Galerie Neue Meister
  - Gemäldegalerie Alte Meister
  - Grünes Gewölbe (Green Vault)
  - Kupferstich-Kabinett
  - Mathematisch-Physikalischer Salon
- State Museum of Zoology, Dresden

=== Leipzig ===
- Leipzig City History Museum
- Grassi Museum, including:
  - Leipzig Museum of Applied Arts
  - Leipzig Museum of Ethnography
  - Museum of Musical Instruments of the University of Leipzig
- Museum of Antiquities of the University of Leipzig
- Museum der bildenden Künste
- Naturkundemuseum Leipzig
- Unikatum Children's Museum, Leipzig
- Zeitgeschichtliches Forum Leipzig

=== Others ===
- Frohnauer Hammer
- Ore Mountain Toy Museum, Seiffen
- Embroidery Machine Museum, Plauen
- German Space Travel Exhibition, Morgenröthe-Rautenkranz

== Saxony-Anhalt ==
=== Halle/Saale ===
- Francke Foundations
- Halloren Chocolate Factory
- Handel House
- Hallors and Saline Museum
- Halle State Museum of Prehistory
- Kunstmuseum Moritzburg Halle (Saale)
- Wilhelm Friedemann Bach House

=== Others ===
- Bauhaus Museum Dessau
- Brocken House
- Jerichow Monastery
- Lutherhaus
- Museum Lyonel Feininger
- Schloss Moritzburg (Zeitz)
- Wernigerode Castle

== Schleswig-Holstein ==
=== Kiel ===
- Zoological Museum of Kiel University

=== Lübeck ===
- Lübeck Museum of Theatre Puppets
- St. Anne's Museum Quarter, Lübeck

=== Others ===
- Hedeby Viking Museum

== Thuringia ==
=== Eichsfeld ===
- Borderland Museum Eichsfeld

=== Eisenach ===
- Bach House (Eisenach)
- Lutherhaus Eisenach
- Wartburg

=== Erfurt ===
- Margaretha Reichardt Haus
- Memorial and Education Centre Andreasstrasse
- Naturkundemuseum Erfurt
- Old Synagogue, Erfurt
- Memorial site Topf & Söhne

=== Gera ===
- Otto Dix Haus

=== Jena ===
- Optical Museum Jena

=== Weimar ===
- Bauhaus Museum, Weimar

== See also ==
- List of museums
- List of railway museums in Germany
