= Kohlfurther Bridge =

Kohlfurther Bridge Kohlfurther Brücke
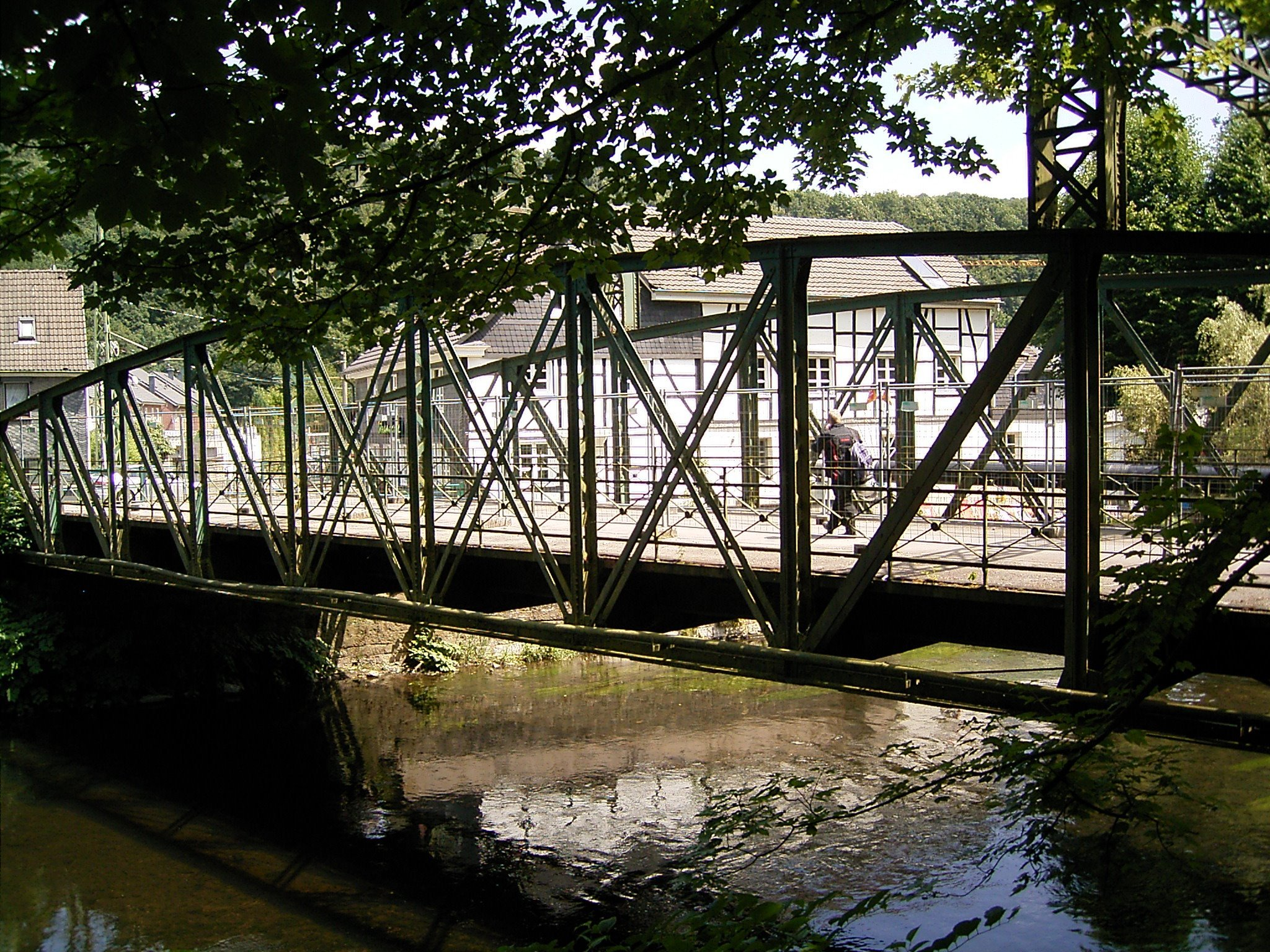
- The Kohlfurther bridge after its renovation
- Coordinates: 51°11′28″N 7°06′37″E
- Carries: Foot traffic
- Crosses: Wupper
- Locale: Wuppertal – Kohlfurth / Solingen – Kohlfurth
- Owner: Landesbetrieb Straßenbau NRW

Characteristics
- Design: steel bridge
- Material: Steel
- Total length: 34.7m
- Width: 8.0m
- Height: 120m above sea level

History
- Construction start: 1893
- Opened: 28 June 1894

The Kohlfurther Bridge (Kohlfurther Brücke) is a truss bridge made of steel over the Wupper river in the borough of Cronenberg in Wuppertal, located on the city limits of Solingen. It served the Straßenbahn from Elberfeld to Solingen until the tramway was shut down in 1969, at which point it became a pedestrian bridge. The name of the bridge is also the name of a street. On April 13, 2006, it was registered in the architectural list, the Baudenkmalliste, of the city of Wuppertal and on May 3, 2006 in the city of Solingen. An extensive restoration was completed on May 8, 2010.

== Architecture ==
The semi-parabolic bridge is made of crucible steel and consists of riveted connections, stretched over the river bed in a slightly oblique position. The two parallel truss beams are divided by eleven vertical poles and rest on supports made from natural stone. The floor of the bridge, in which the former tram rails lie, is now asphalted. Only the three inner fields of the trusses are reinforced by cross-shaped struts, while the others fields have simple struts between the upper and lower straps. In the course of an extension to the tram connection, the upper straps were reinforced by transverse bends to stabilize the construction.

== History ==
Long before the existing bridge was built, there was a wooden bridge at this point, mentioned for the first time in 1363. In 1714 it was replaced by a stone bridge, making it the only bridge in this region to allow the dry crossing of the river on the way from Solingen to Cronenberg. The foundations of the pillars are still detectable in low water today. The massive and stable stone bridge was however only one lane.

It was replaced in 1893 by the existing steel bridge, built by the Morlan & Wilms company from Neumühl, and was handed over to public transport on 28 June 1894.

In 1913/14 a conversion for tramway operation of the Barmer Bergbahn took place, which then concluded a connection from Cronenberg and Solingen, and thus represented the largest spread of the tramway in the region. Until May 3, 1969, line 5 of Elberfeld went to Solingen. In the year of the decommissioning, the association Bergische Museumsbahnen was founded.

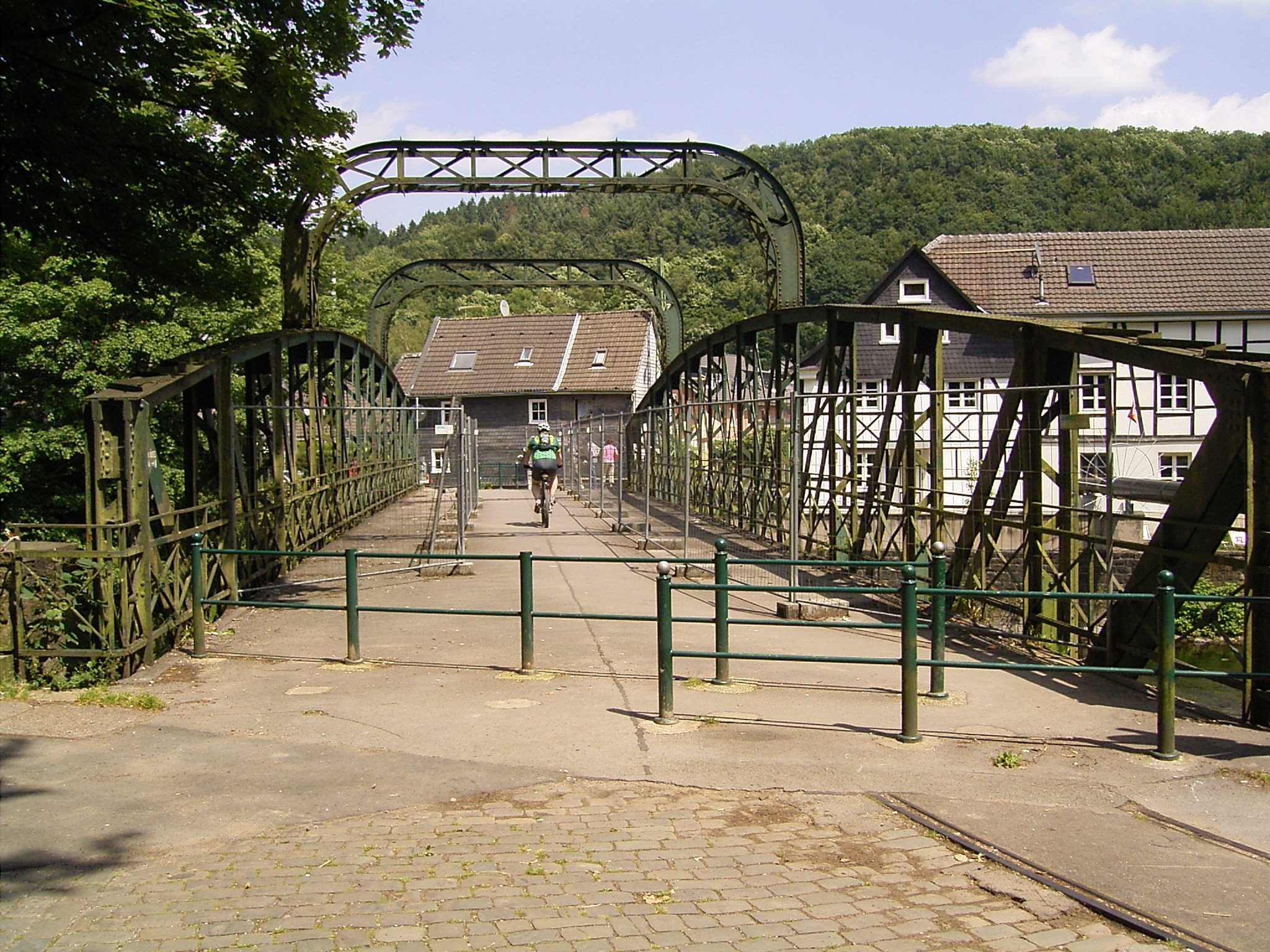
The partially closed bridge

Since the 1970s the bridge, owned by Landesbetrieb Straßenbau NRW (LBS), has served only pedestrian and bicycle traffic, yet it is considered as a building to the Landesstraße 427. The duty of safety and maintenance falls to the city of Wuppertal.

On March 17, 2005, it was completely closed without prior warning because of the risk of a collapse, so that the districts were separated from each other. This was followed by the Bürgerinitiative Kohlfurtherbrücke , which fought for the preservation of the bridge and a complete refurbishment. At the time, an amount of 1.6 million euros was estimated for a refurbishment, and the LBS therefore planned the demolition of the bridge and the construction of a wooden bridge. After a petition by Bürgerentscheid and under pressure from numerous local politicians, the bridge was temporarily repaired and reopened for the streetcar festival of the museum in 2005, but only on a width of 2.5 meters.

In the middle of 2006 it was decided to renovate the bridge in the spring of 2007. The costs were now estimated at EUR 785,000, some of which were to be borne by the LBS, the Land and the Stiftung Deutscher Denkmalschutz. A small portion of about ten percent would be borne by the two cities.

After several delays, the reconstruction work was started at the end of November 2008. The bridge was completely dismantled in January 2009 and rebuilt at a later date. On September 10, 2009, the refurbished facade sections were fitted with a protective coating. They were to restore the historic appearance of the bridge. The restored Kohlfurther Bridge was reopened on 8 May 2010, including new lighting.
