= Aegidienkirche, Braunschweig =

Aegidienkirche
- Liebfrauenmünster St. Aegidien
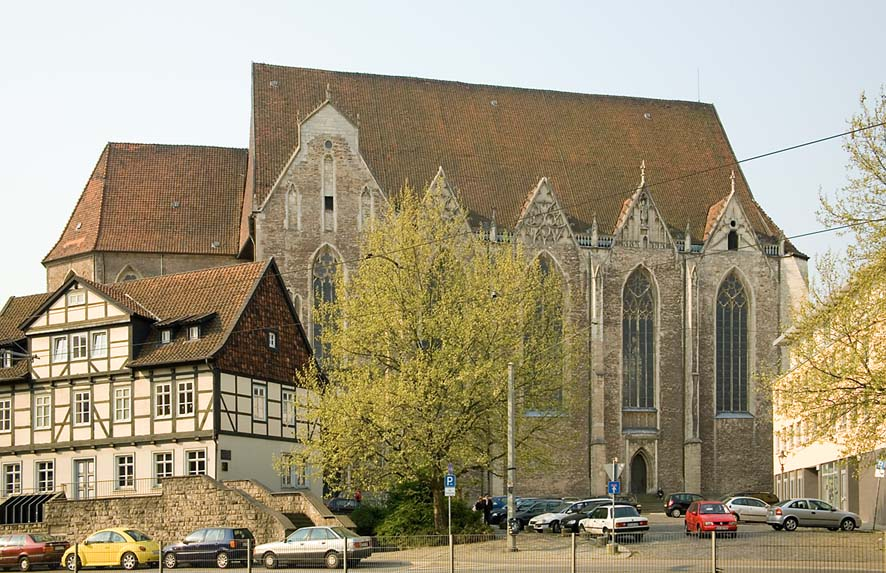
- The Aegidienkirche and Ägidienmarkt from the north.

- Location in Lower Saxony.
- 52.2596°N 10.5253°E
- Location: Braunschweig, Germany
- Denomination: Roman Catholic
- Previous denomination: Protestant

History
- Status: Parish church
- Founder: Gertrude of Brunswick

Architecture
- Style: Gothic

The Aegidienkirche or Liebfrauenmünster St. Aegidien is the main Roman Catholic church in the German city of Braunschweig, located in the city centre. It is a hall church in the Gothic style, built to replace a Romanesque building of 1115 which burned down in 1278. It acted as the abbey church to the Benedictine abbey of saints Maria and Aegidius, endowed by Gertrude of Brunswick, and after the monastery's abolition in the Reformation it was used as a Protestant church and for secular use as the Ägidienhalle. Since 1902 part of its former monastic buildings has been used by the Braunschweigisches Landesmuseum. In 1945 it was made a Roman Catholic parish church.

== Gallery ==
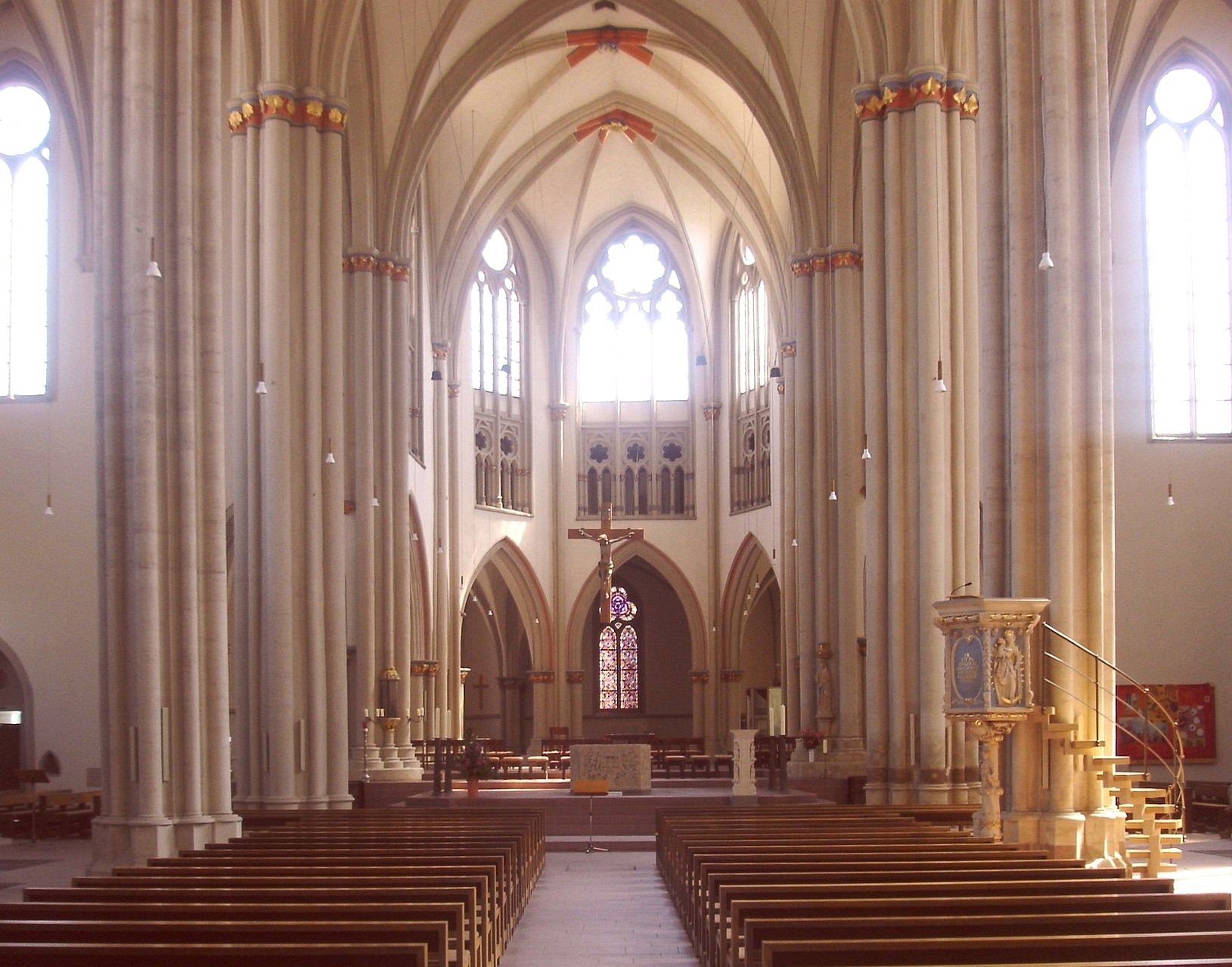
Nave and choir

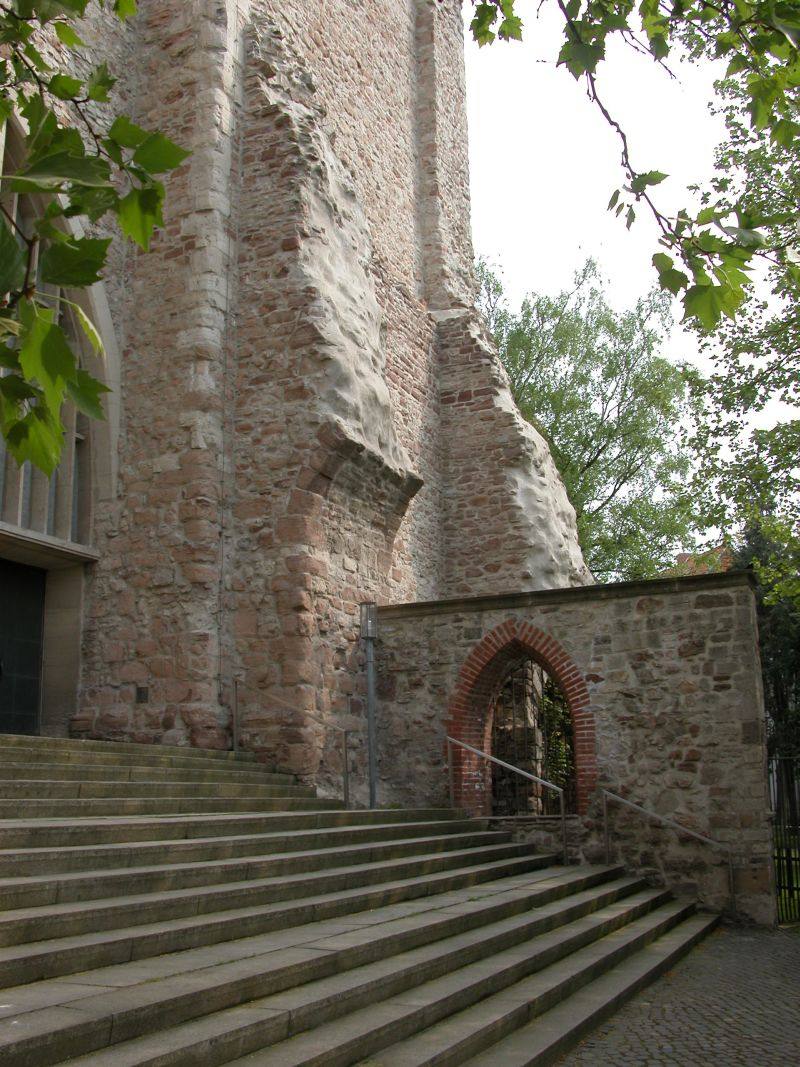
West end and remains of the tower

== Sources ==
- "St. Aegidien" (in German). Archived from the original on 2016-08-10.
- Kuessner, Dietrich. "Die Braunschweiger Stadtkirchen 1933 – 1950" [The Brunswick Town Churches 1933 – 1950 (Views of a Sunken City)]. Ansichten einer versunkenen Stadt (in German).
