= Braunschweigisches Landesmuseum =

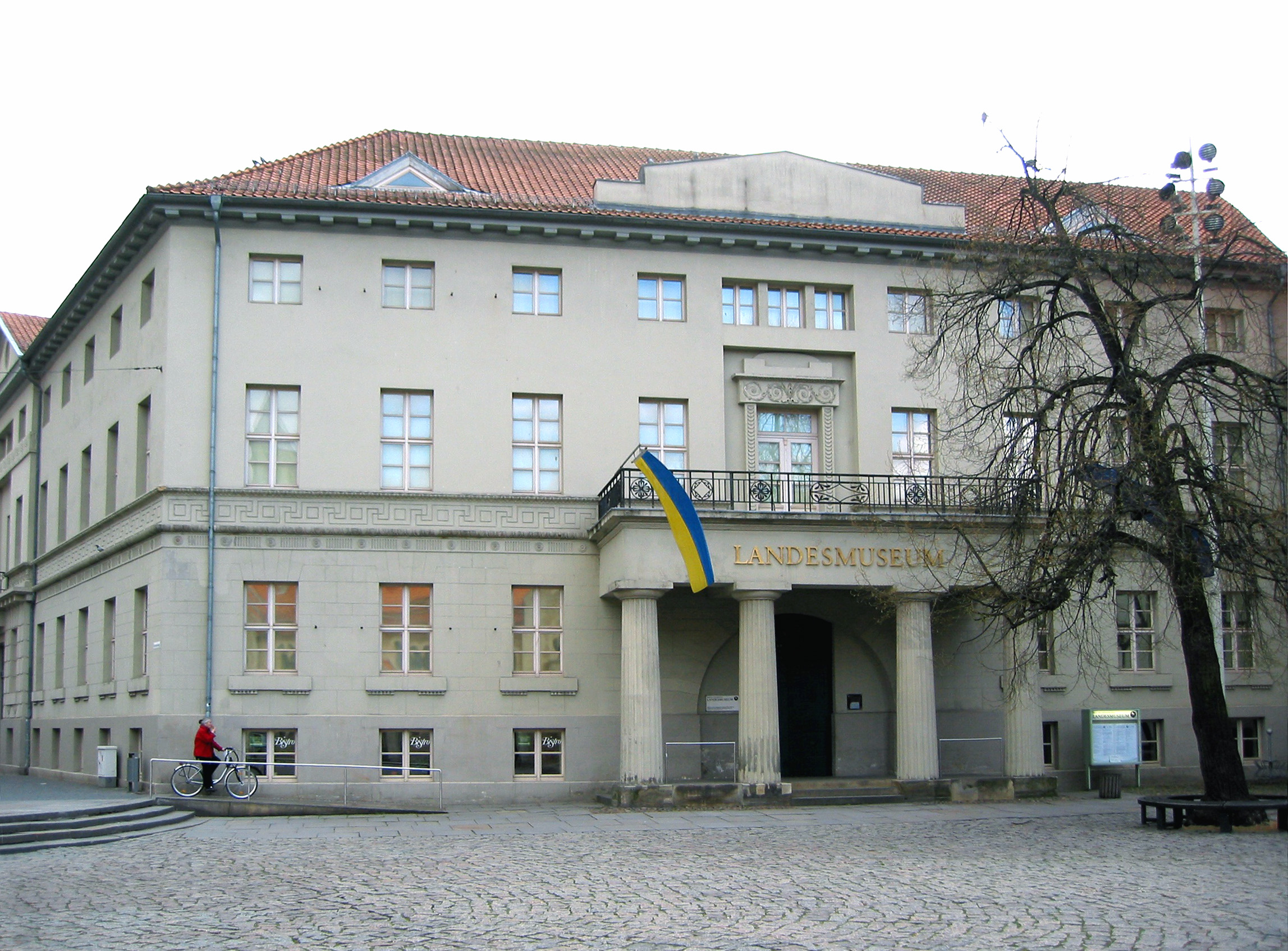
- Vieweg-Haus
- Established: 11 October 1891
- Location: Brunswick, Germany
- Coordinates: 52°15′53″N 10°31′23″E
- Type: History museum
- Collection size: 600,000–800,000
- Owner: Niedersächsische Landesmuseen Braunschweig
- Website: www.3landesmuseen.de

Braunschweigisches Landesmuseum (BLM) is a history museum in Braunschweig, Germany, operated by the state of Lower Saxony. The museum is scattered on four locations: Vieweghaus, Hinter Ägidien (both in Braunschweig), Kanzlei (Wolfenbüttel) and Bauernhausmuseum (Bortfeld).

The collection covers 500,000 years and includes objects from the history of the Braunschweig area, including culture, economy, technology, folk arts, and social history. Today, the BLM hosts a collection of 600,000 to 800,000 objects.

== History ==
The museum's history dates back to 11 October 1891, when it was founded in the Duchy of Brunswick as Vaterländisches Museum für Braunschweigische Landesgeschichte. Originally it was located in a street called Hagenscharrn in the city of Braunschweig. In 1938, the museum was renamed to Braunschweigisches Landesmuseum für Geschichte und Volkstum. This name remained until 31 December 1982.

== Vieweghaus ==
The neoclassicist building, the former publishing house of Vieweg Verlag, hosts the main collection, and is located in the city center at the castle square (Burgplatz). A large part of the collection was moved there in 1986.

== Hinter Ägidien ==
Located in the street Hinter St. Aegidien, this annex exhibits Judaica and was opened to the public in 1746. Center piece is a synagogue interior from Hornburg.

== Kanzlei Wolfenbüttel ==
This annex focuses on prehistoric and ancient history (500,000 BC until 8th century AD) of the region and was established there in 1959. The building was built in the 16th century and is located in the city center.

== Bauernhausmuseum ==
The Bortfelder Bauernhausmuseum section was opened in 1968 and is located in Bortfeld, a village in the municipality of Wendeburg, district of Peine. This museum reflects on the rural life of the region. The central attraction is a farmhouse from 1639 (reetgedecktes Hallenhaus).

== Gallery ==
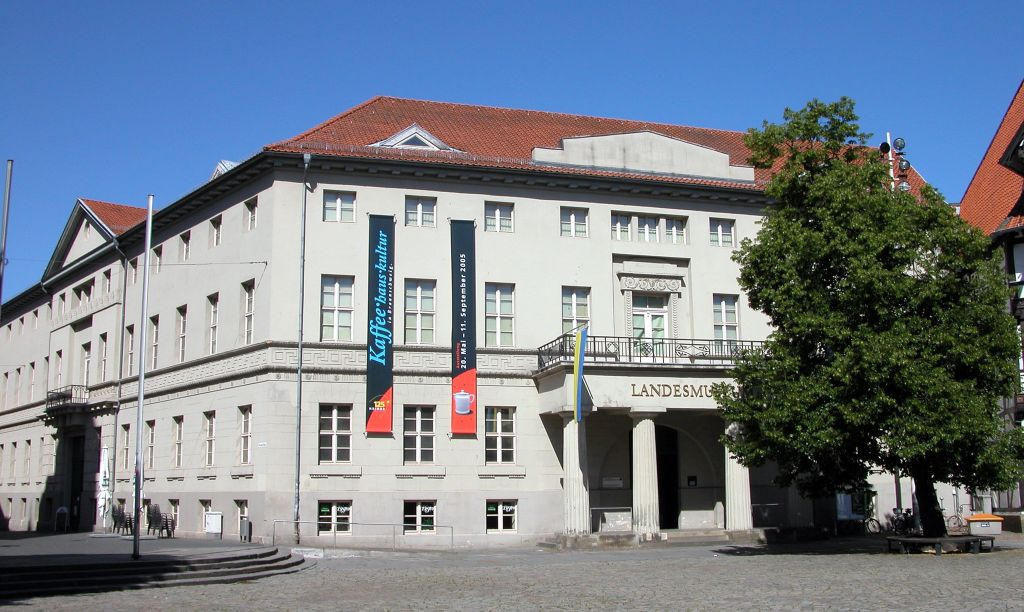
Vieweg-Haus

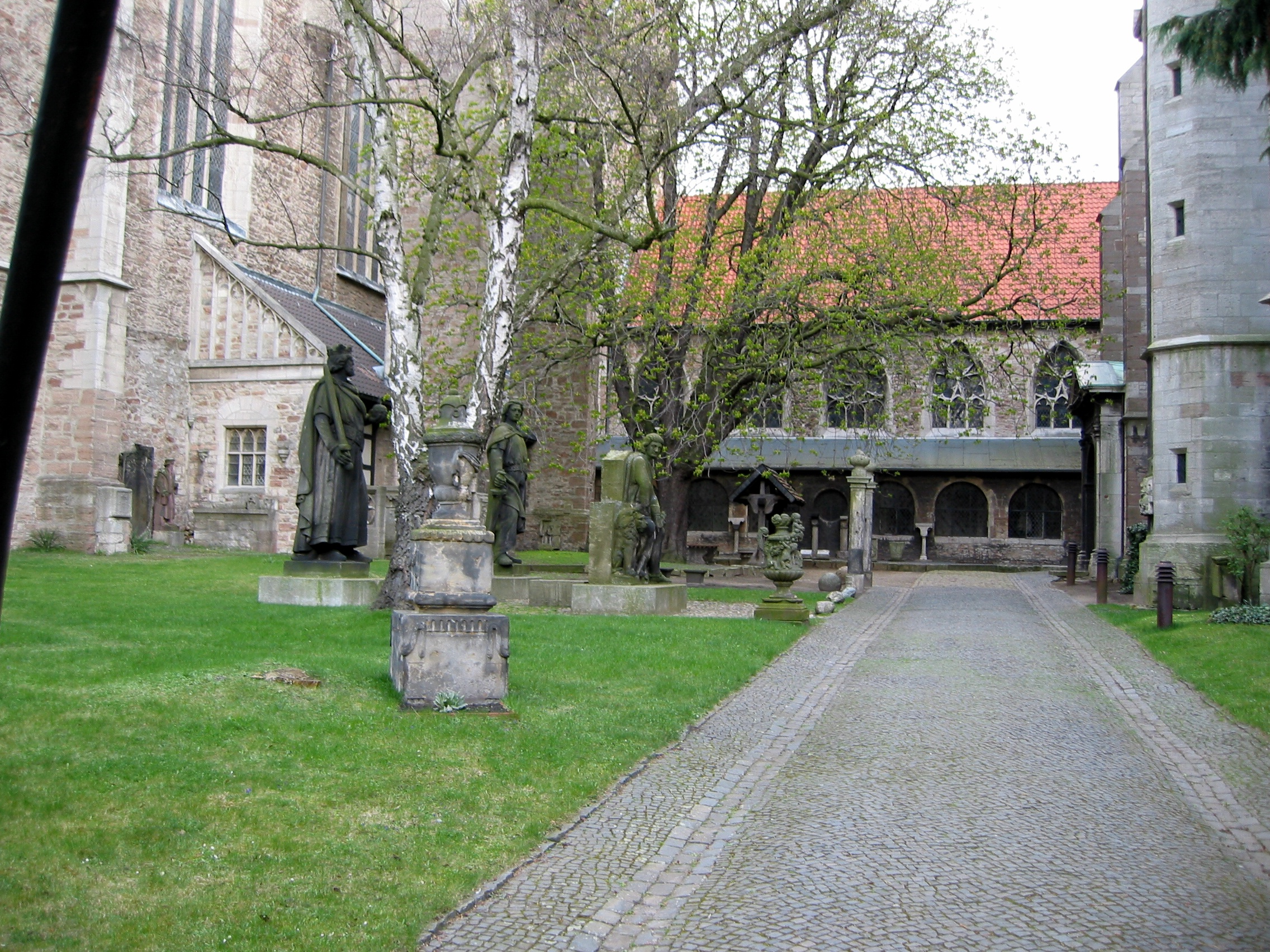
Hinter Ägidien

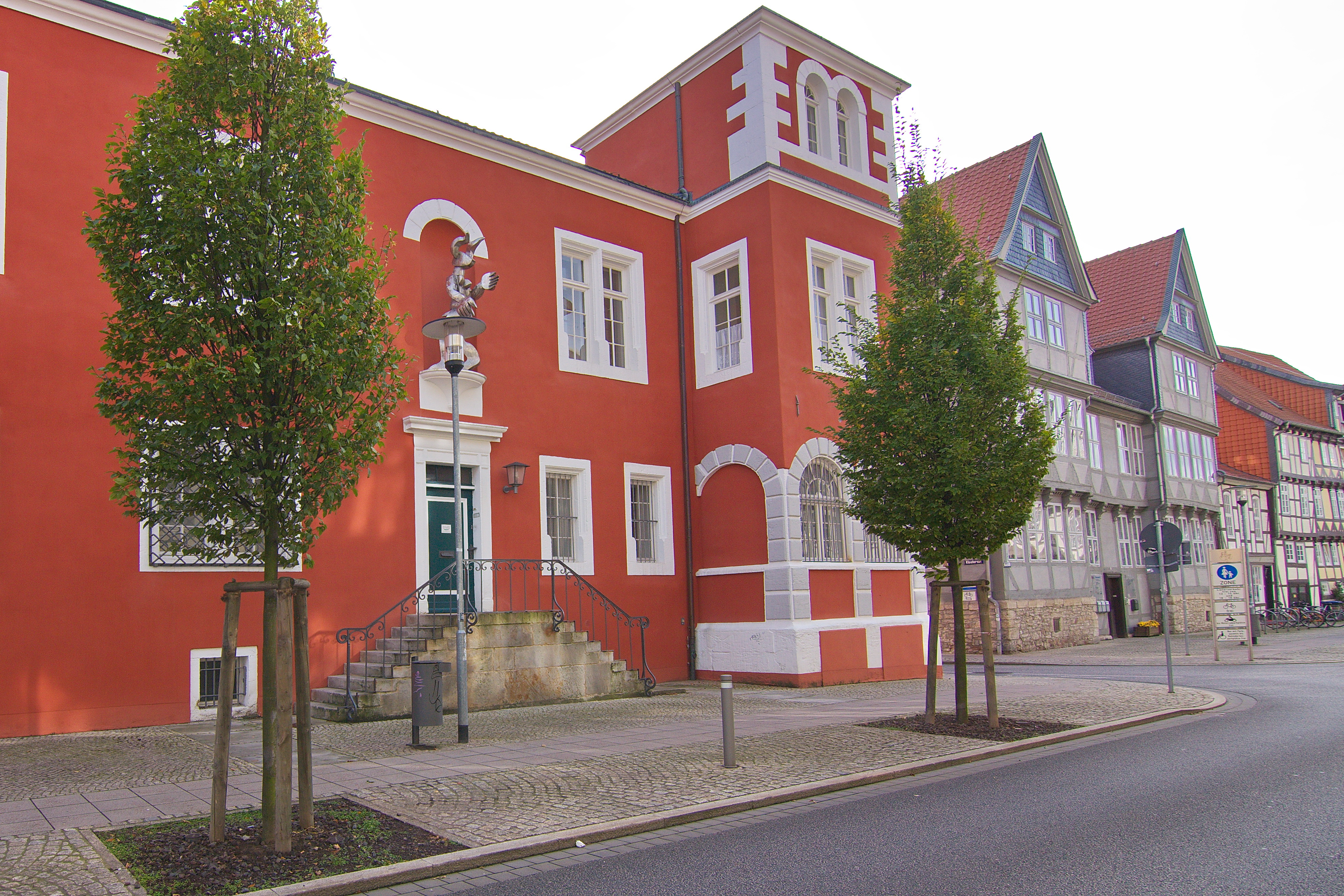
Kanzlei Wolfenbüttel

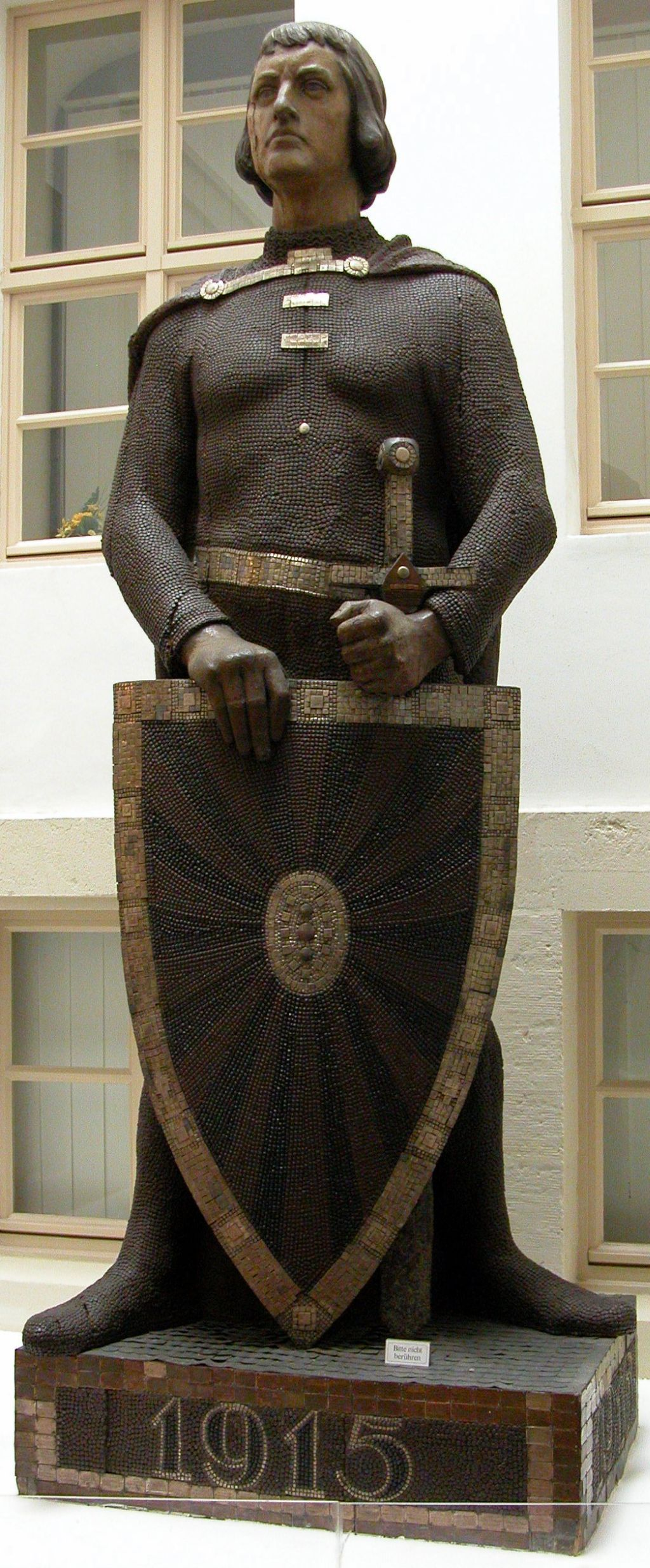
Eiserner Heinrich, nail man from the museum's collection

== See also ==
- List of museums in Germany

== Literature ==
- Biegel, Gerd (1992). Herzöge, Revolution und Nierentisch (in German). Braunschweig: Braunschweigisches Landesmuseum. ISBN 978-3-927939-14-1.
- Braunschweiger Stadtlexikon. Haupt-Bd (in German). Braunschweig: Meyer. 1996. ISBN 978-3-926701-14-5.
- Jarck, Horst-Rüdiger; Schildt, Gerhard (2000). Die braunschweigische Landesgeschichte (in German). Braunschweig: Appelhans. ISBN 978-3-930292-28-8.
