= Innenstadt (Braunschweig) =

- Borough of Braunschweig
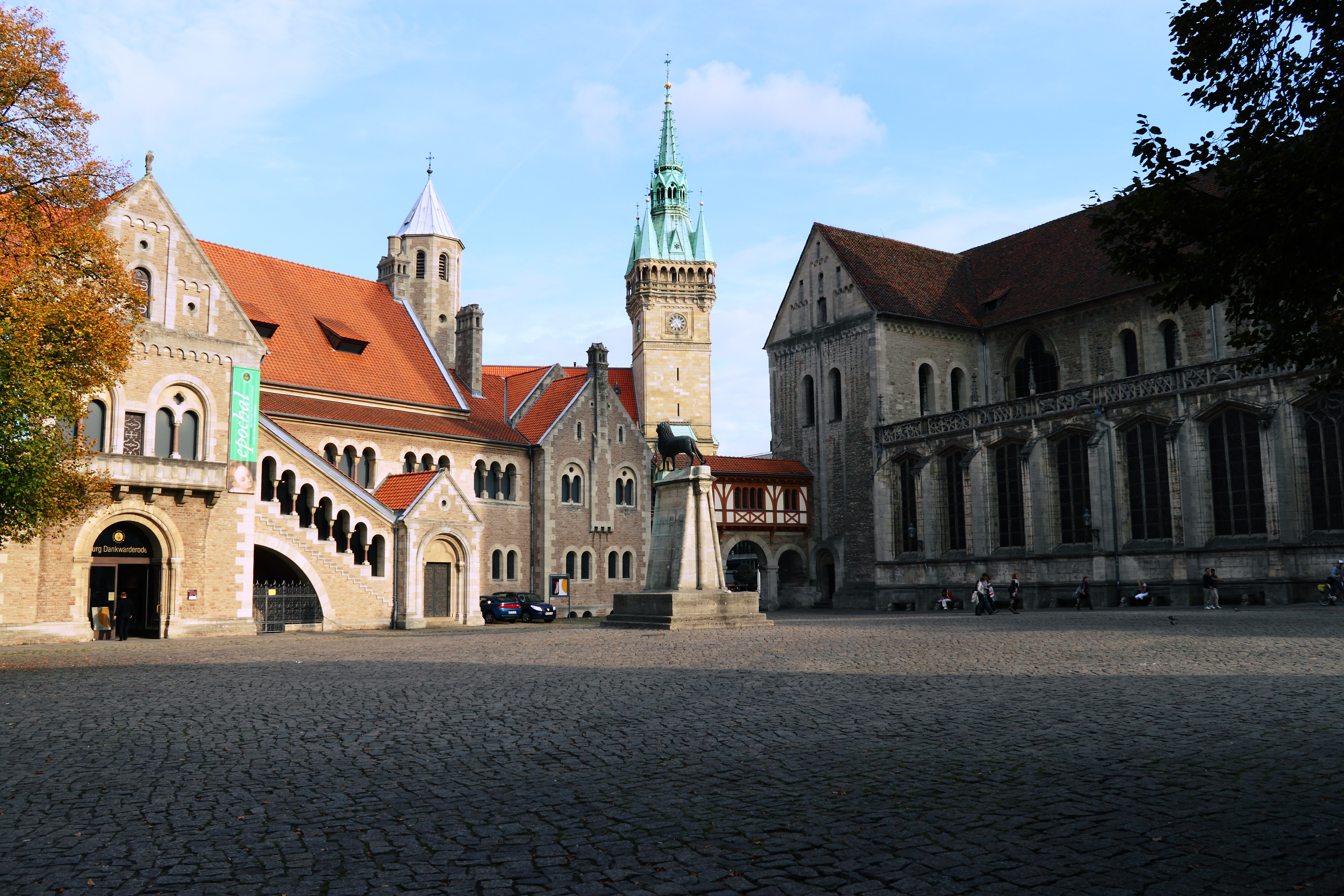
- Burgplatz

- Coat of arms

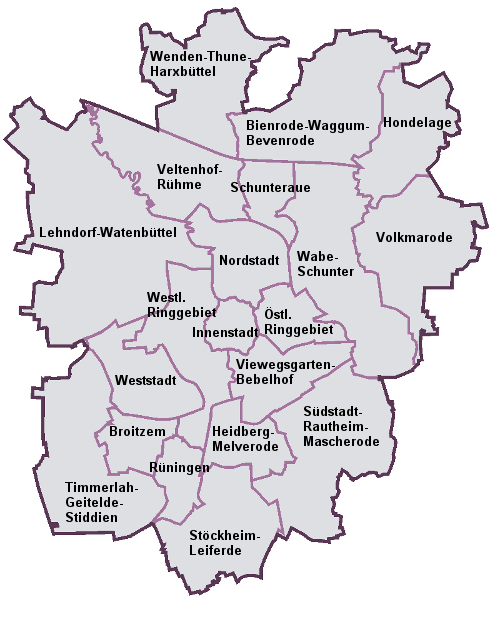
- Boroughs of Braunschweig
- Interactive map of Innenstadt
- Location within Germany Location within Lower Saxony
- Coordinates: 52°15′51″N 10°31′18″E
- Country: Germany
- State: Lower Saxony
- District: urban district
- City: Braunschweig

Government
  - Mayor: Ines Werner (SPD)

Area
  - Total: 02.374 km^{2} (0.917 sq mi)

Population (2020-12-31)
  - Total: 14,229
  - Density: 5,994/km^{2} (15,520/sq mi)
- Time zone: UTC+01:00 (CET)
  - Summer (DST): UTC+02:00 (CEST)
- Postal codes: 38100
- Dialling codes: 0531
- Vehicle registration: BS
- Website: Official Website

The Innenstadt (German pronunciation: [ˈɪnənˌʃtat], lit. 'Inner City') is the central Stadtbezirk (borough) of Braunschweig, Germany. The district consists of five formerly independent city municipal areas (Altewiek, Altstadt, Hagen, Neustadt, and Sack), and is surrounded by the river Oker and in area nearly identical to the medieval city of Braunschweig.

== History ==
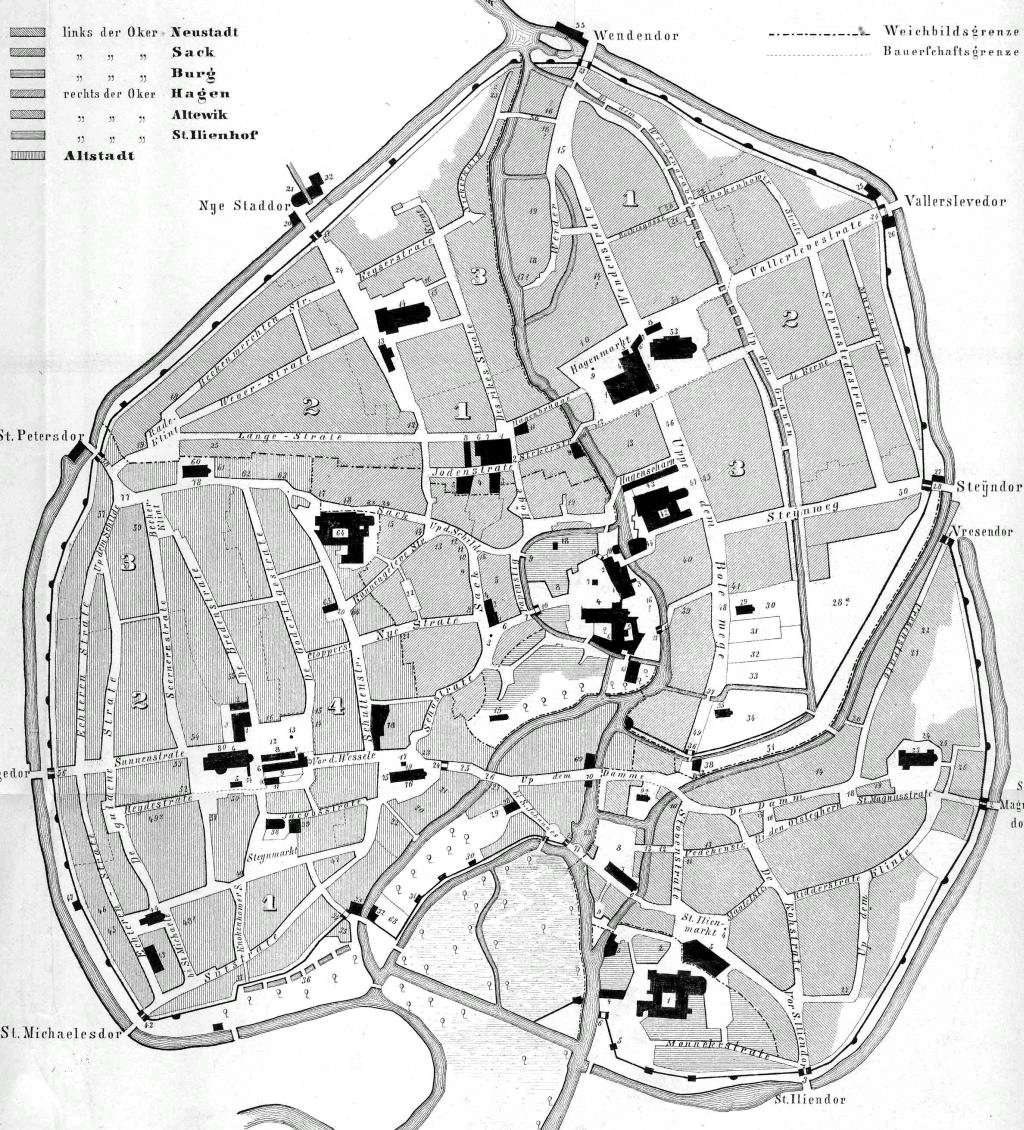
Map of Braunschweig in 1400

It wasn't until the 19th century, when industrialisation caused rapid population growth, that Braunschweig was enlarged beyond its medieval fortifications and the Oker. Therefore, up to that point the history of Innenstadt is identical with that of the city itself.

From the Middle Ages up to the early modern period, Braunschweig's population ranged between about 15,000 and 25,000 people, making it one of the largest German cities at the time. Today 13,500 people live in the Innenstadt. Due to the city's growth since the 19th century, the district today therefore is home to just about 5.5% of Braunschweig's population, and makes up only 2.1% of its current area.

During World War II the Allied air raids destroyed 90 percent of Braunschweig's inner city. A small section of the Altstadt survived the bombing, and since the 1990s there also have been increased efforts to restore and reconstruct historic buildings that had been destroyed in the war.

== Politics ==
The district mayor, Ines Werner, is a member of the Social Democratic Party of Germany.

== Main sights ==
Most of Braunschweig's main sights are located within the inner city, including the five so-called Traditionsinseln - parts of the medieval city that either survived World War II or were reconstructed since then.

The Traditionsinseln are:

- The Burgplatz (Castle Square), with Dankwarderode Castle, Brunswick Lion, and Brunswick Cathedral
- The Altstadtmarkt ("Old Town Market")
- The Michaelisviertel (St. Michael's Quarter)
- The Magniviertel (St. Magnus' Quarter)
- The Aegidienviertel (St. Giles' Quarter)

Also located within the district are the Herzog Anton Ulrich Museum, the State Museum of Brunswick, Brunswick Palace, and the State Theatre. The Innenstadt is Braunschweig's main shopping district and home to the city's annual Christmas market.

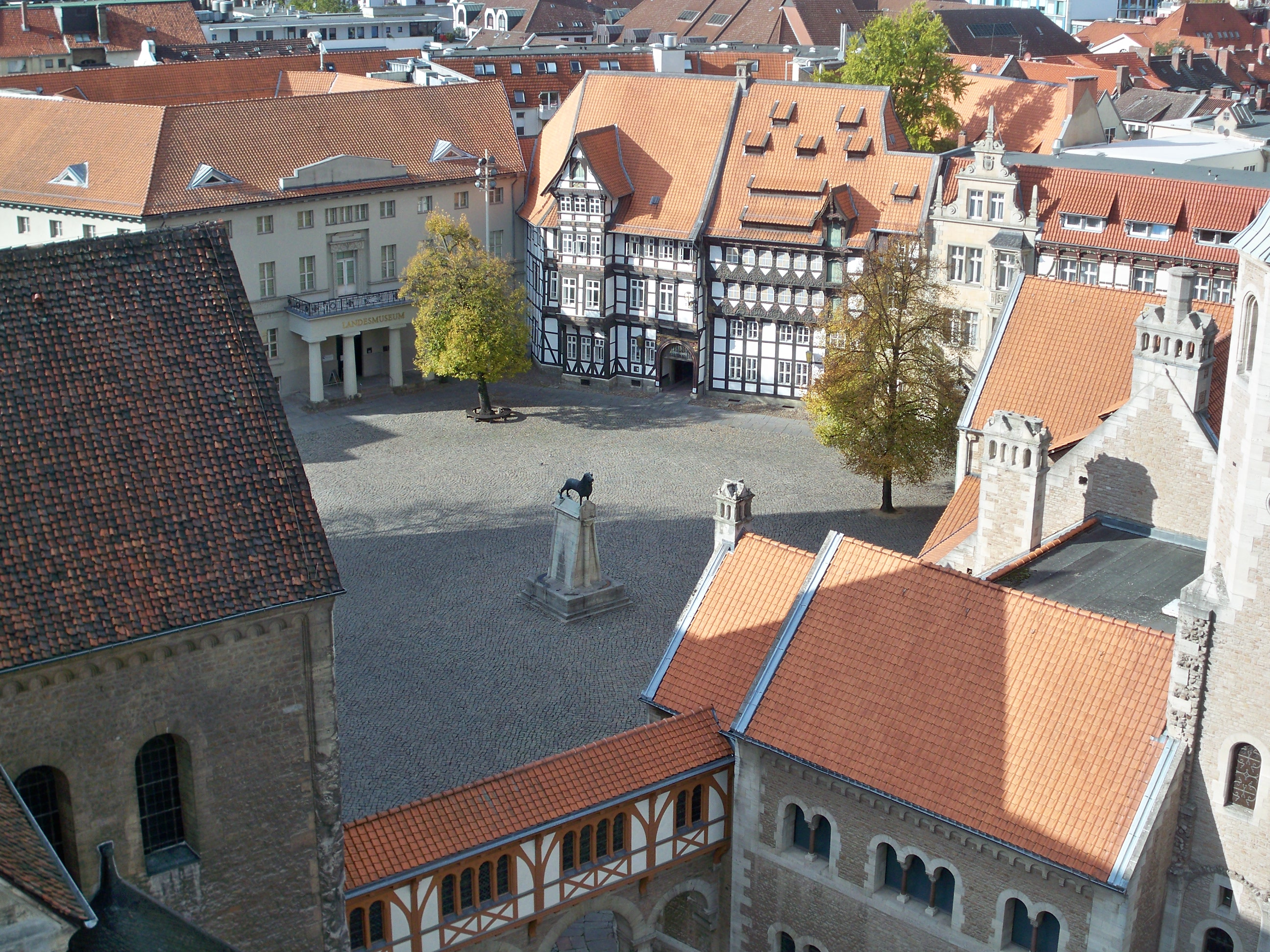
Burgplatz

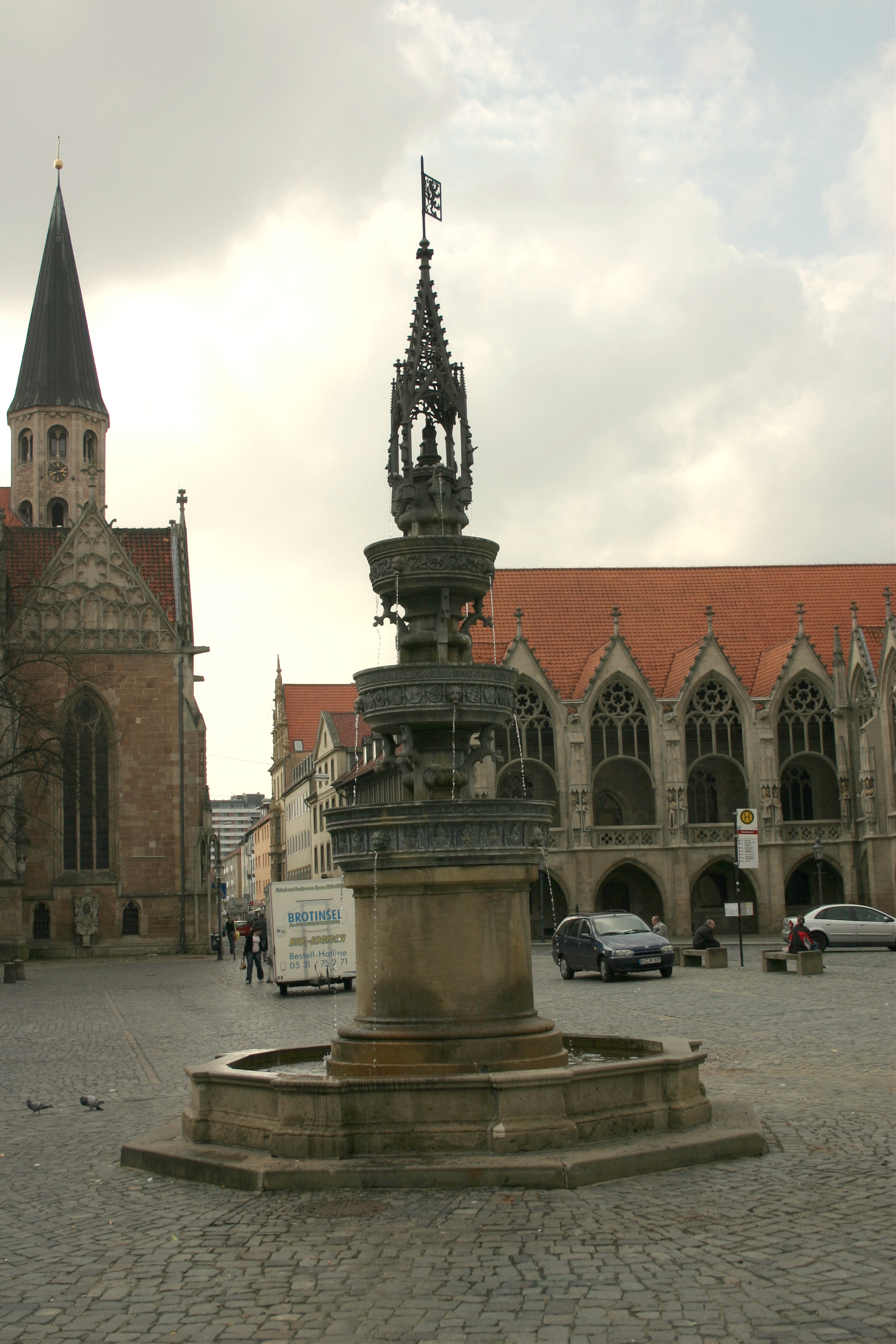
Altstadtmarkt

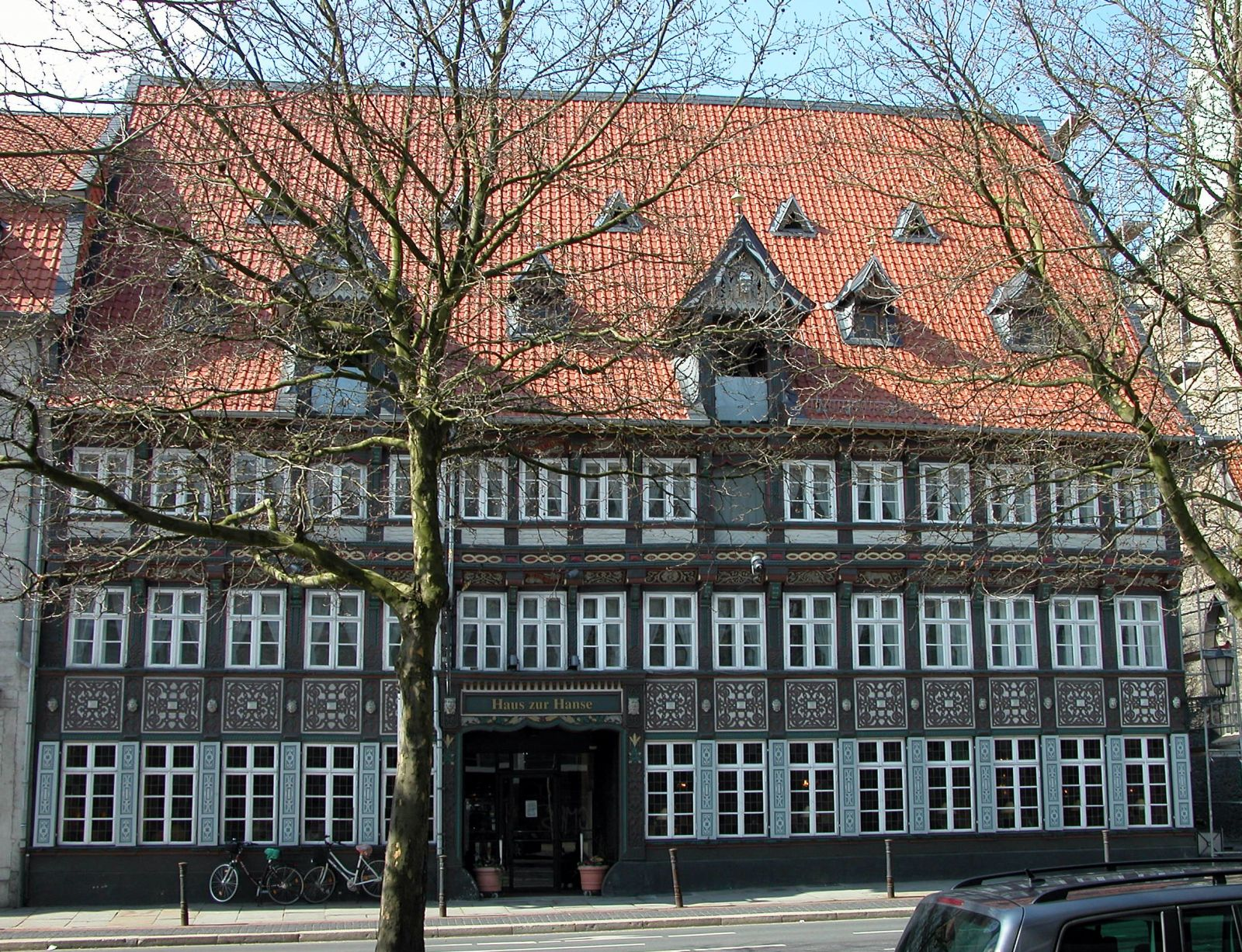
Haus zur Hanse (House of the Hanseatic League) in the Michaelisviertel

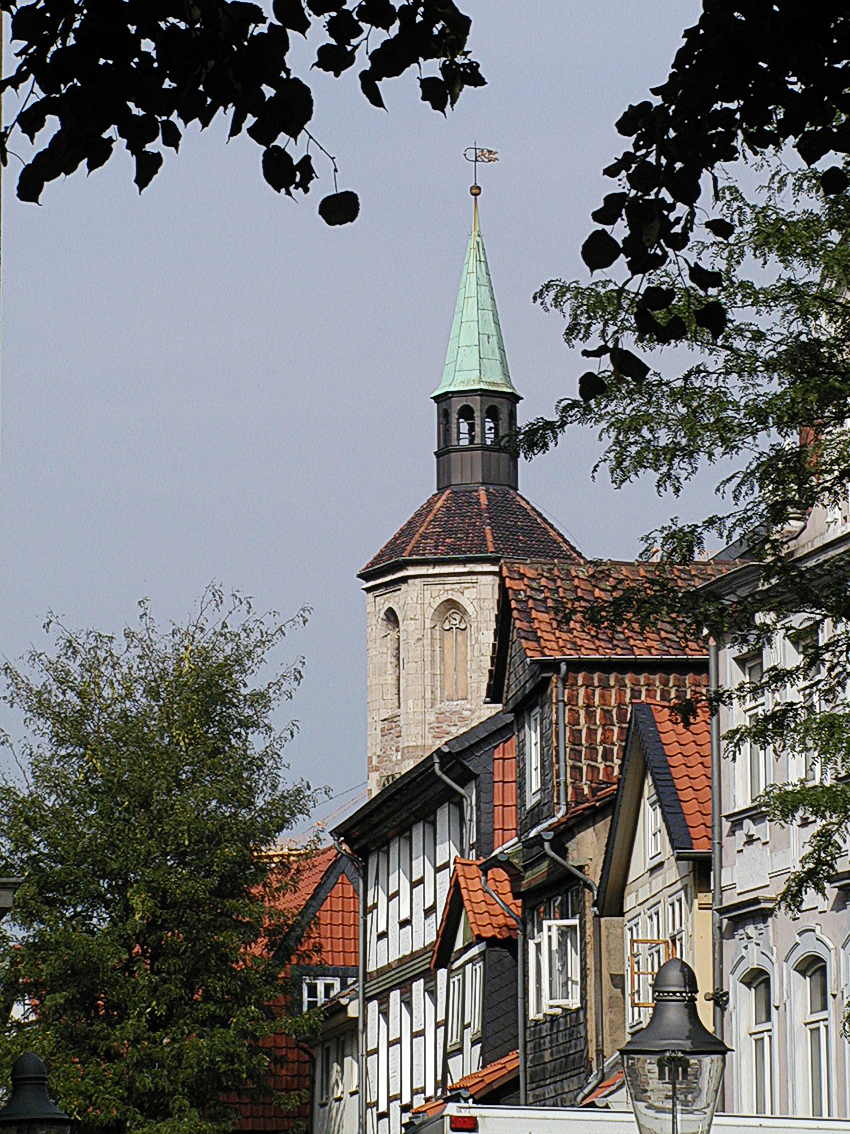
Magniviertel

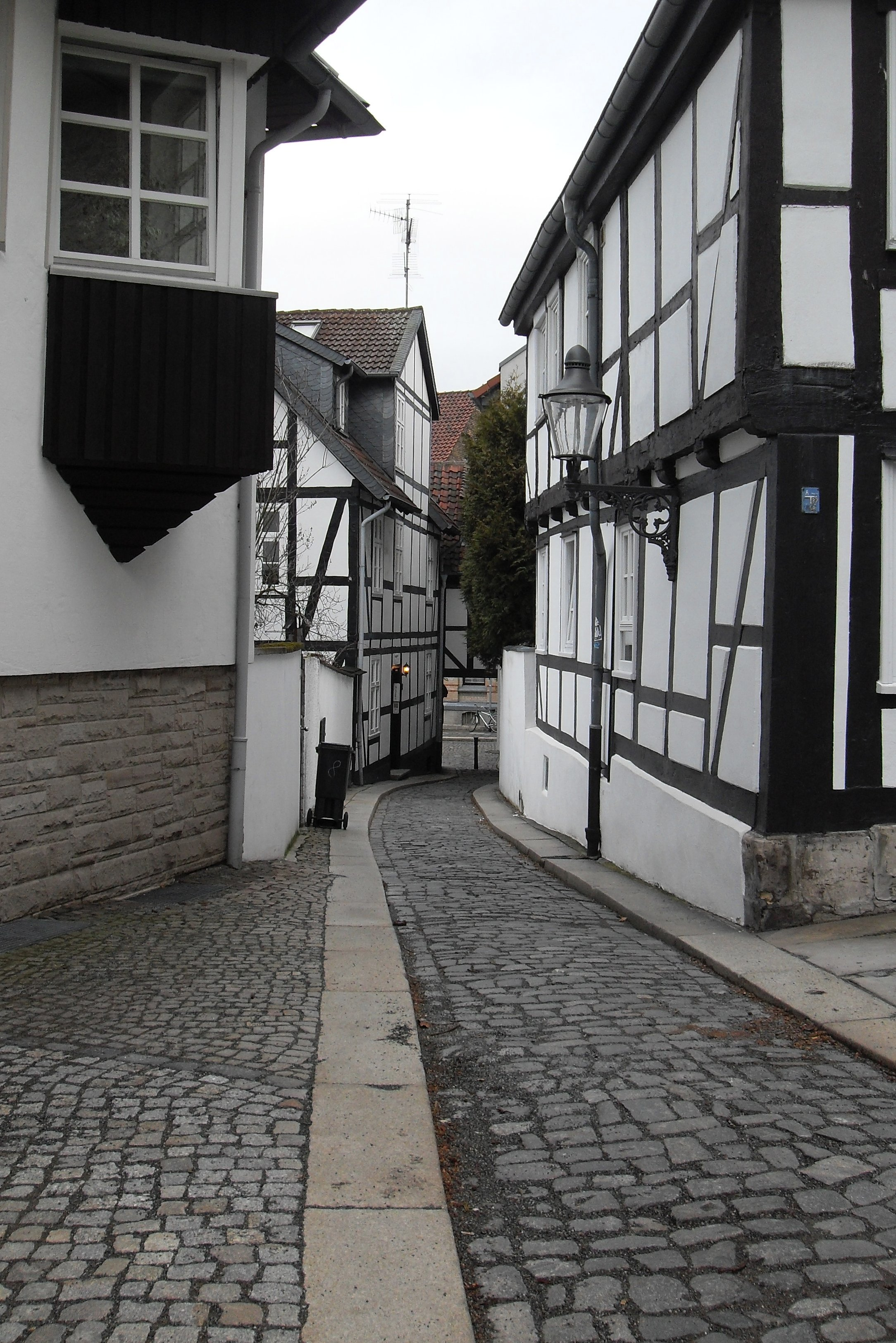
Aegidienviertel

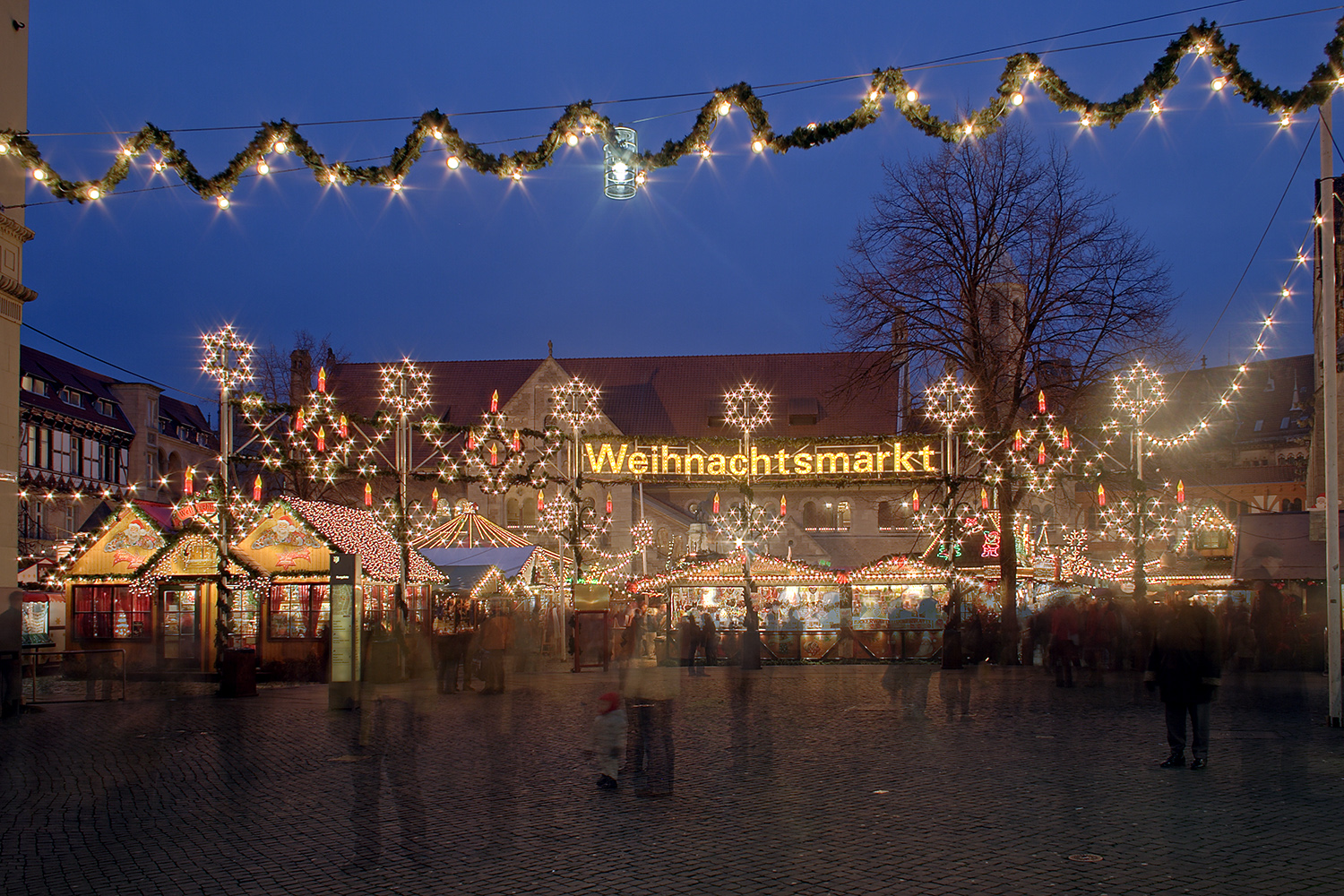
Christmas market on Burgplatz

== Coat of arms ==
The Innenstadt uses the same coat of arms as the city of Braunschweig. Each of the five precincts also has its own coat of arms, all showing Brunswick's red lion on a silver shield:

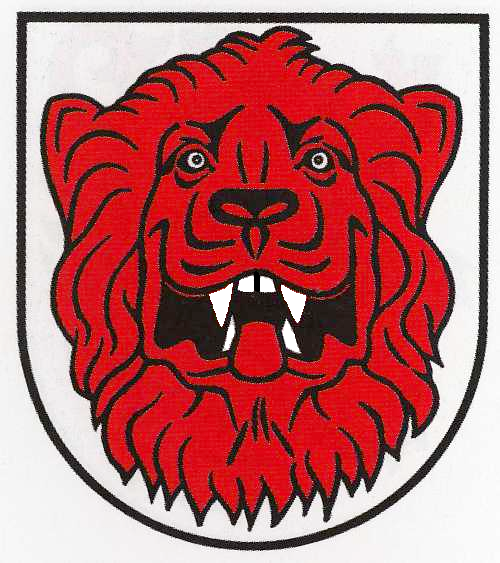
Coat of arms of Altewiek

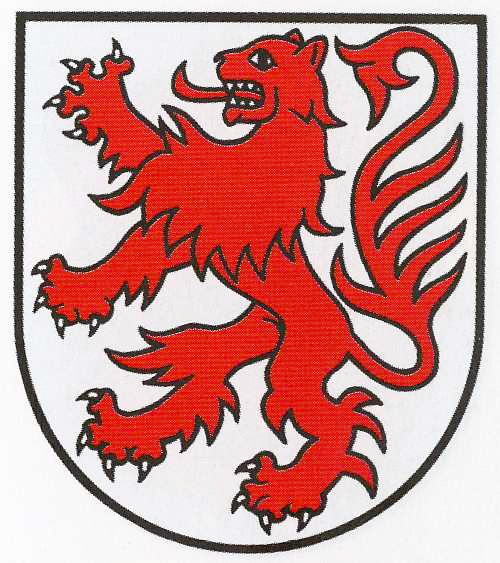
Coat of arms of Altstadt

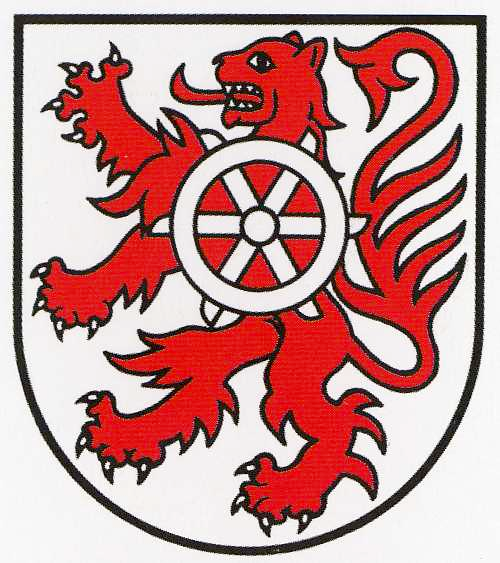
Coat of arms of Hagen

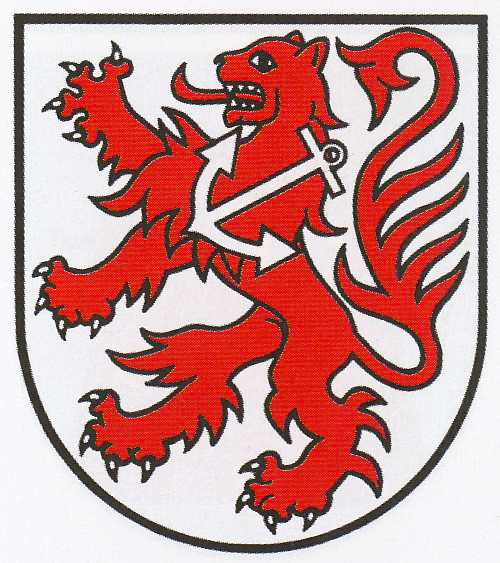
Coat of arms of Neustadt

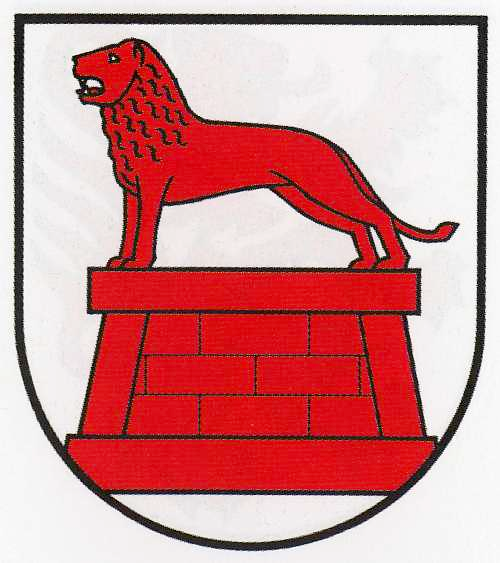
Coat of arms of Sack
