= Geschichte Für Alle =

Historical society in Nuremberg, Germany

Geschichte Für Alle e.V. - Institut für Regionalgeschichte
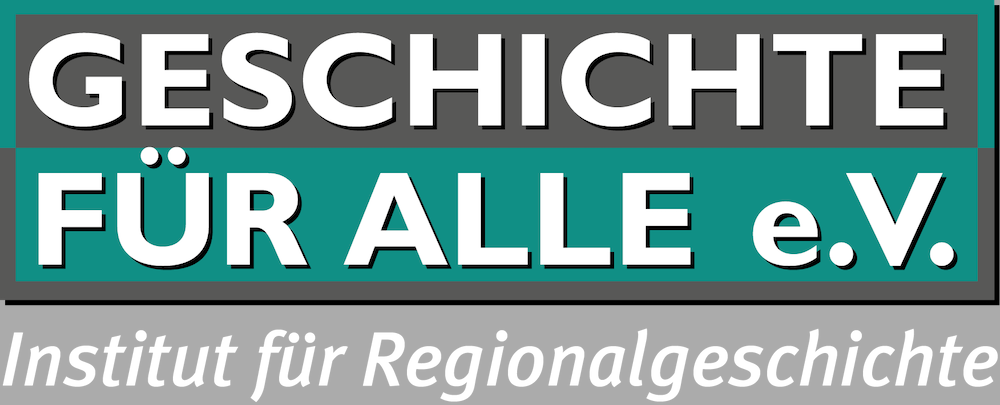
- Abbreviation: GFA
- Established: 1985; 41 years ago
- Founded at: Nuremberg
- Type: Historical society
- Legal status: Charity
- Purpose: Historical research, education
- Location: Nuremberg, Germany
- Members: 1785 (2026)
- Chairmen/Chairwoman: Dr. Felix Steffan, Johannes Pechstein, Ulla Hossfeld
- Managing Directors: Alexander Büttner, Magdalena Prechsl
- Publication: Geschichtsrundbrief (Historical Bulletin)
- Volunteers: 604 (2025)
- Website: geschichte-fuer-alle.de

Geschichte Für Alle (engl.: History For Everyone) e.V. - Institut für Regionalgeschichte (engl.: Institute for Regional History), abbr. 'GFA', is a historical society, based in Nuremberg, Germany. With about 1,800 members it is one of the largest historical societies in Germany. In addition to Nuremberg, GFA operates in the cities of Bamberg, Erlangen and Fürth, where it offers guided tours in several languages. GFA oversees research projects throughout the Franconia region. The organisation operates two museums in Nuremberg and publishes historical literature through its affiliated Sandberg Verlag publishing house.

== History ==
The association Geschichte Für Alle (History For Everyone) was founded on June 19, 1985, by a group of history students at Friedrich-Alexander University Erlangen-Nuremberg (FAU)... Its original purpose was to “promote young historians,” as reflected in the subtitle of the association's name at the time. The association's idea was less connected to existing tourist traditions than to the “new history movement”, which was the basis for history workshop work and the oral history projects that had been increasingly emerging since the 1970s.

In 1994, the association received the City of Nuremberg's Culture Promotion Award.

In 2001, GFA expanded to Bamberg. In the same year GFA became an educational partner in the study forum of the newly opened Documentation Center Nazi Party Rally Grounds. In 2007, the association opened the Nuremberg Executioner's House Museum (German: Henkerhaus) in the former official residence of the Nuremberg executioner. In 2010, GFA (together with other partners) took over the museum education program for the newly opened Memorium Nuremberg Trials.

Since 2018 GFA has overseen and organized the laying of the stumbling blocks by Gunter Demnig in Nuremberg. In 2025 the organisation oversaw the laying of the first Stumble Barrier in Nuremberg in remembrance of a group of Jewish schoolgirls at a local school, who either had to flee the country or were killed in concentration camps.

The scientific team has provided expert support for documentaries on national and international television.

In 2025 GFA celebrated its 40th anniversary. In the same year GFA created the museum 'Lernort Stadtmauer' (City Wall Learning Center) at the Nuremberg city wall in the rebuilt “Blaues G” tower, featuring an exhibition and an educational program

== Sandberg Verlag Publishing House ==
Sandberg Verlag publishing house was founded in 1994. Sandberg Verlag publishes the books authored by GFA staff members

Publications by Sandberg Verlag in English (excerpt):

- Bielefeld, Katrin (2005), The history of Jews in Fuerth - A Home for Centuries, Nürnberg: Sandberg Verlag, ISBN 978-3-930699-61-2
- Urban, Markus (2008), The Nuremberg trials. A short guide, Nürnberg: Sandberg Verlag, ISBN 978-3-930699-53-7
- Schieber, Martin (2008), Nuremberg - The medieval city. A Short Guide, Nürnberg: Sandberg Verlag, ISBN 978-3-930699-59-9
- Nisly, Jadon (2016), Bamberg - A 1000 Year History, Nürnberg: Sandberg Verlag, ISBN 978-3-930699-89-6
- Prechsl, Magdalena (2021), A history of crime in Nuremberg, Nürnberg: Sandberg Verlag, ISBN 978-3-96486-011-8
- Schmidt, Alexander (2022), The Nazi Party Rally Grounds Nuremberg - A Short Guide, Nürnberg: Sandberg Verlag, ISBN 978-3-930699-47-6
- Gürtler, Daniel (2022), The Main-Danube Canal. Idea-History-Technology, Nürnberg: Sandberg Verlag, ISBN 978-3-930699-80-3
- Teget-Welz, Manuel (2024), Albrecht Dürer - In Search of the Artist in Nuremberg, Nürnberg: Sandberg Verlag, ISBN 978-3-96486-020-0
- Schmidt, Alexander (2024), A History of the Jews in Nuremberg. A Short Guide, Nürnberg: Sandberg Verlag, ISBN 978-3-96486-026-2
