= Museum zur Vorgeschichte des Films =

Museum

Coordinates: 51°25′45″N 6°52′05″E

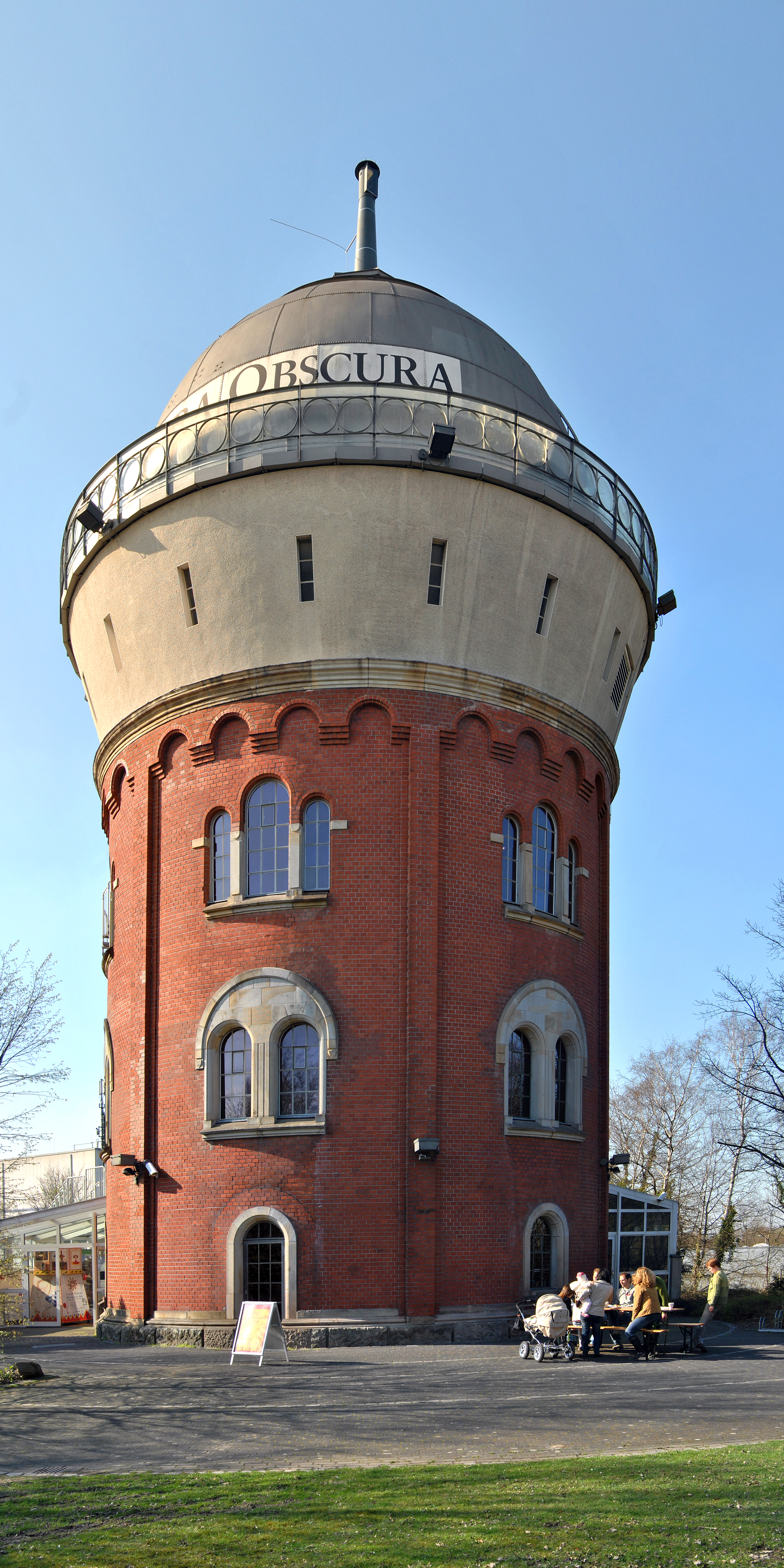
Museum im Wasserturm Mülheim (March 2011)

The Museum zur Vorgeschichte des Films (English: Museum of the Prehistory of Film) is a permanent exhibition on the development of moving images before the invention of cinematography. Together with the world's largest walk-in camera obscura, the museum is housed in a 25.5 m high water tower in the Broich district of Mülheim. Together with the neighbouring roundhouse, the water tower is part of the Industrial Heritage Trail.

== Water tower ==
The water tower was built in 1904 on the edge of the main railway workshop (later the Reichsbahn Ausbesserungswerk) in Mülheim-Speldorf to supply the locomotives in the nearby roundhouse and on the Lower Ruhr Valley Railway.

The turntable of the roundhouse and other buildings of the RAW were destroyed in an air raid in 1943, but the water tower remained undamaged.

The water tank is a covered Barkhausen tank from the Aug. Klönne company, Dortmund.

== Camera obscura ==
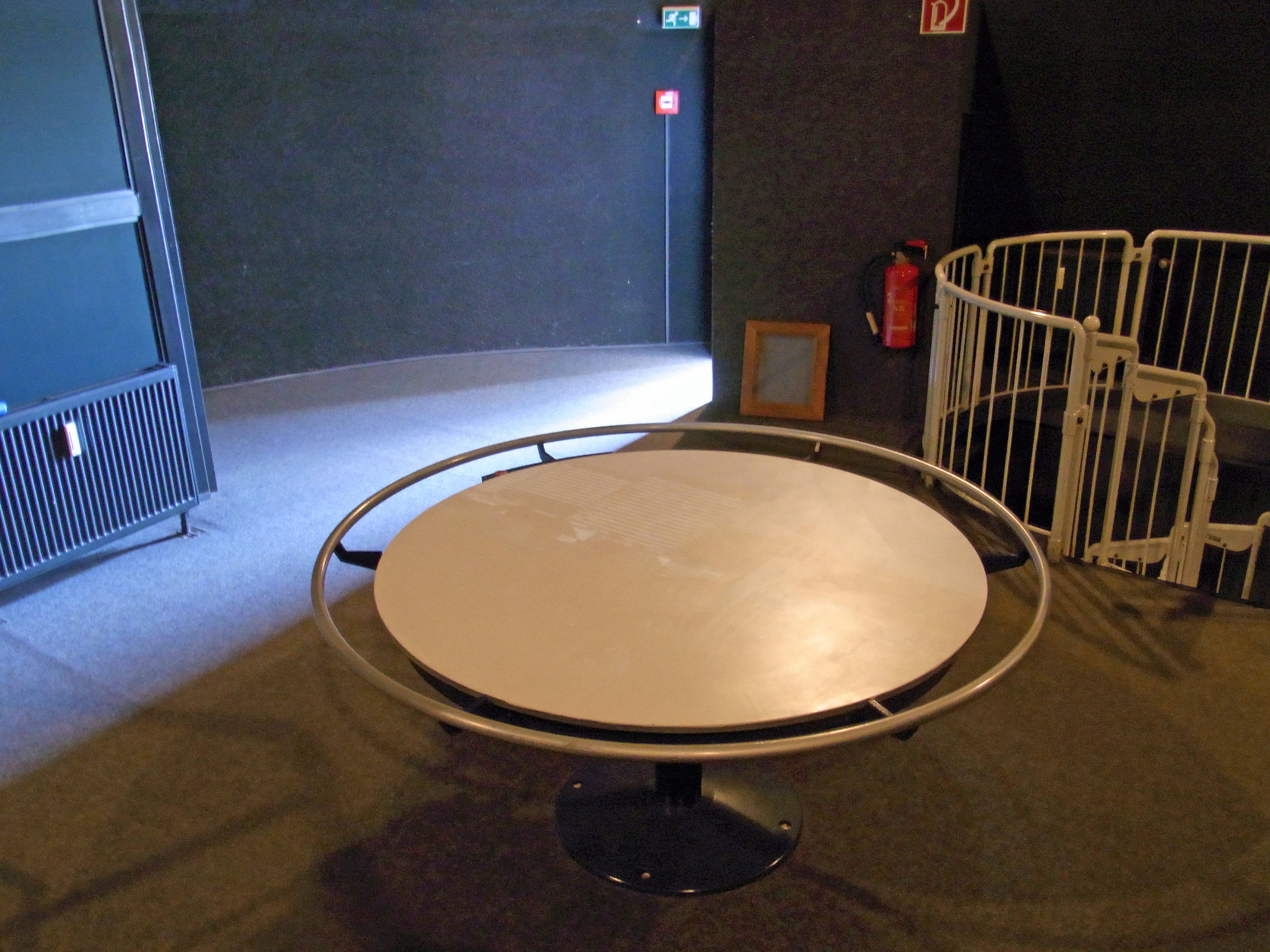
The Camera obscura in the museum

The world's largest walk-in camera obscura was installed in the water tank for the 1992 Mülheim Regional Garden Show based on an idea by Werner Nekes. The technology came from Carl Zeiss AG, with the €250,000 project being financed entirely by donations.

The camera obscura provides a 360° panoramic view of the Garden Show grounds and the Ruhr promenades. On the projection table, all objects at a distance of 13 meters from the tower to the horizon can be shown in sharp focus.

- The optical system consists of a rotatable head with a tilting mirror and lens.
- The mirror has a free diameter of 300 mm.
- The objective is a focusable three-lens system with an aperture of 144 mm and a focal ratio of 1:65.
- The distance from the lens to the projection table (cutting distance) is approx. 10 m.
- The object and image angles are both 8°.

== Museum ==
After the water tank received its new use as a walk-in pinhole camera in 1992, the actual tower and its foundation stood empty after short-term gastronomic use and were in danger of being side-lined. It was not until 2005 that sufficient funds were available to begin redesigning the interior of the tower and turning it into a museum. The exhibition concept was largely planned by the architect Hans-Hermann Hofstadt, and the museum opened in September 2006. The planning of the content was done by the art historian and museum director Tobias Kaufhold in consultation with the collector KH. W. Steckelings.

On the three floors below the water tank, more than 1,100 exhibits from the collection of the Wuppertal photographer and art collector KH. W. Steckelings are on display. Dating from the period between 1750 and 1930, these document the technical development before the invention of cinematography, i.e. "how pictures learned to walk". The exhibition includes kaleidoscopes, magic lanterns as well as peep-boxes and other "magic boxes" that bring the era before the invention of film and photography to life.
