= Memorium Nuremberg Trials =

Museum in Nuremberg, Germany

- Memorium Nürnberger Prozesse
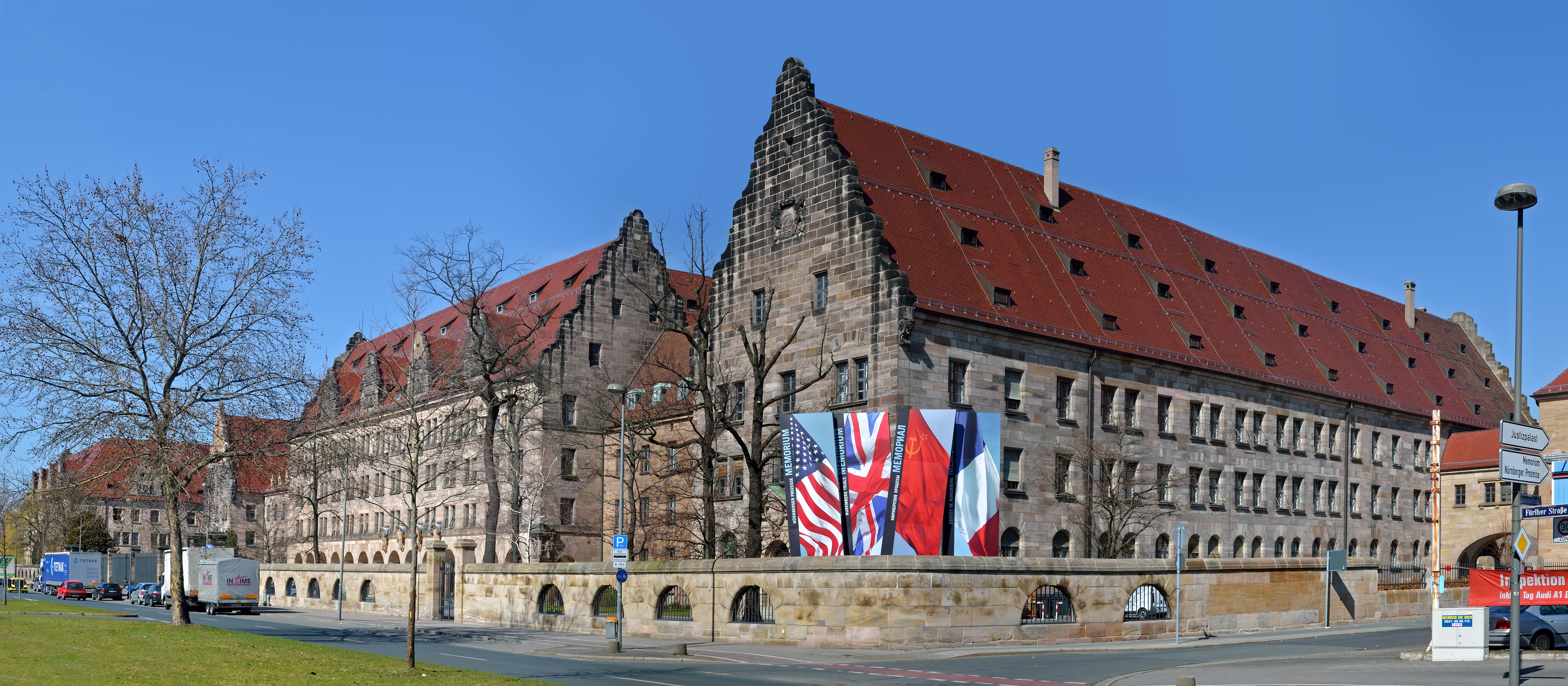
- Palace of Justice in Nuremberg with billboards of the Memorium Nuremberg Trials
- Established: 21 November 2010
- Location: Nuremberg
- Coordinates: 49.4544°N 11.0483°E
- Type: Historical
- Visitors: 158,000 (2024)
- Director: Nina Lutz
- Architect: Hugo von Höfl
- Owner: City of Nuremberg
- Website: https://museums.nuernberg.de/memorium-nuremberg-trials/

The Memorium Nuremberg Trials is a museum located in the Palace of Justice in Nuremberg. It provides information about the Nuremberg Trials, which took place at the historic site from 1945 to 1949.

== History of the museum ==
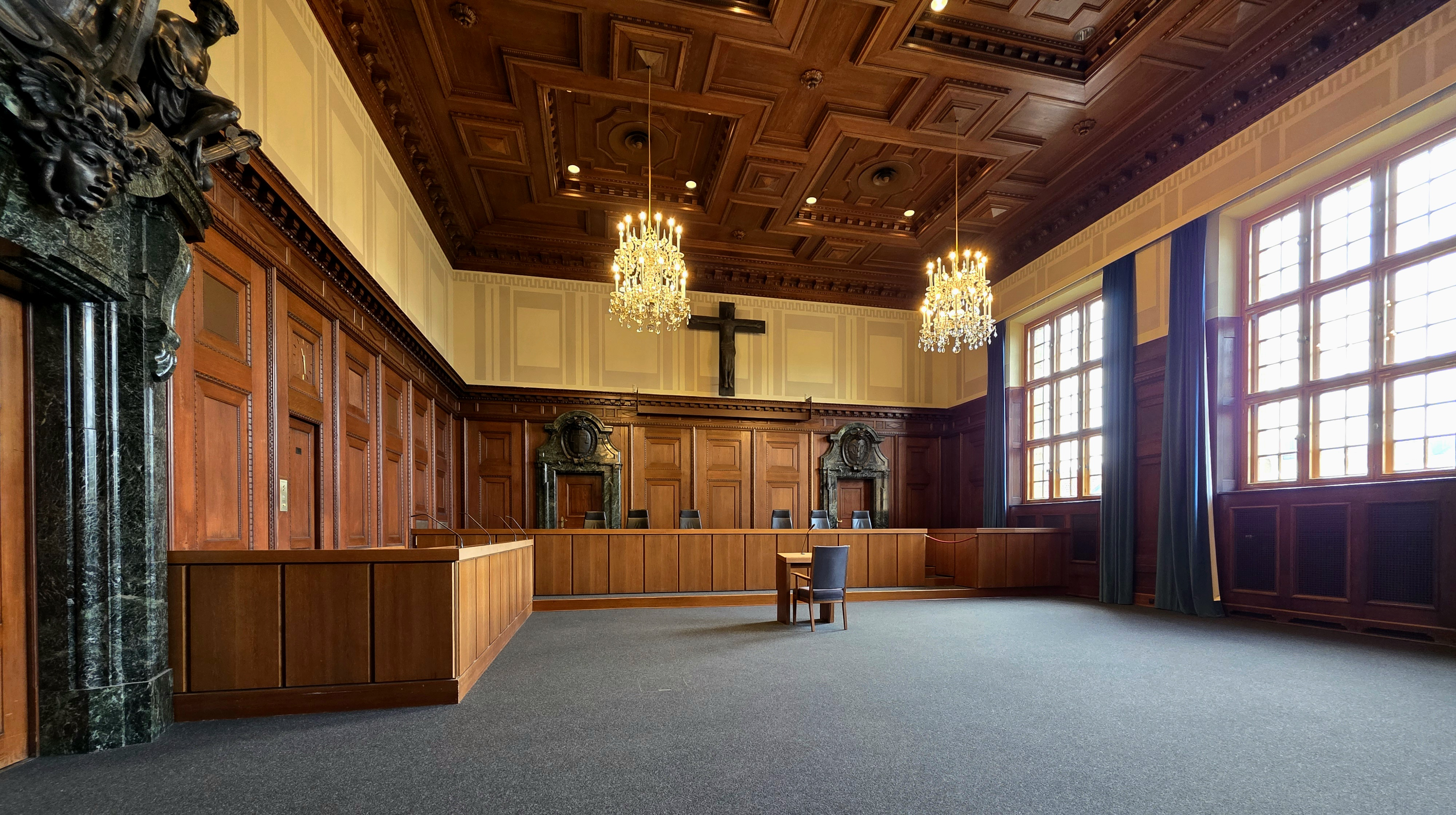
Courtroom 600 in 2025

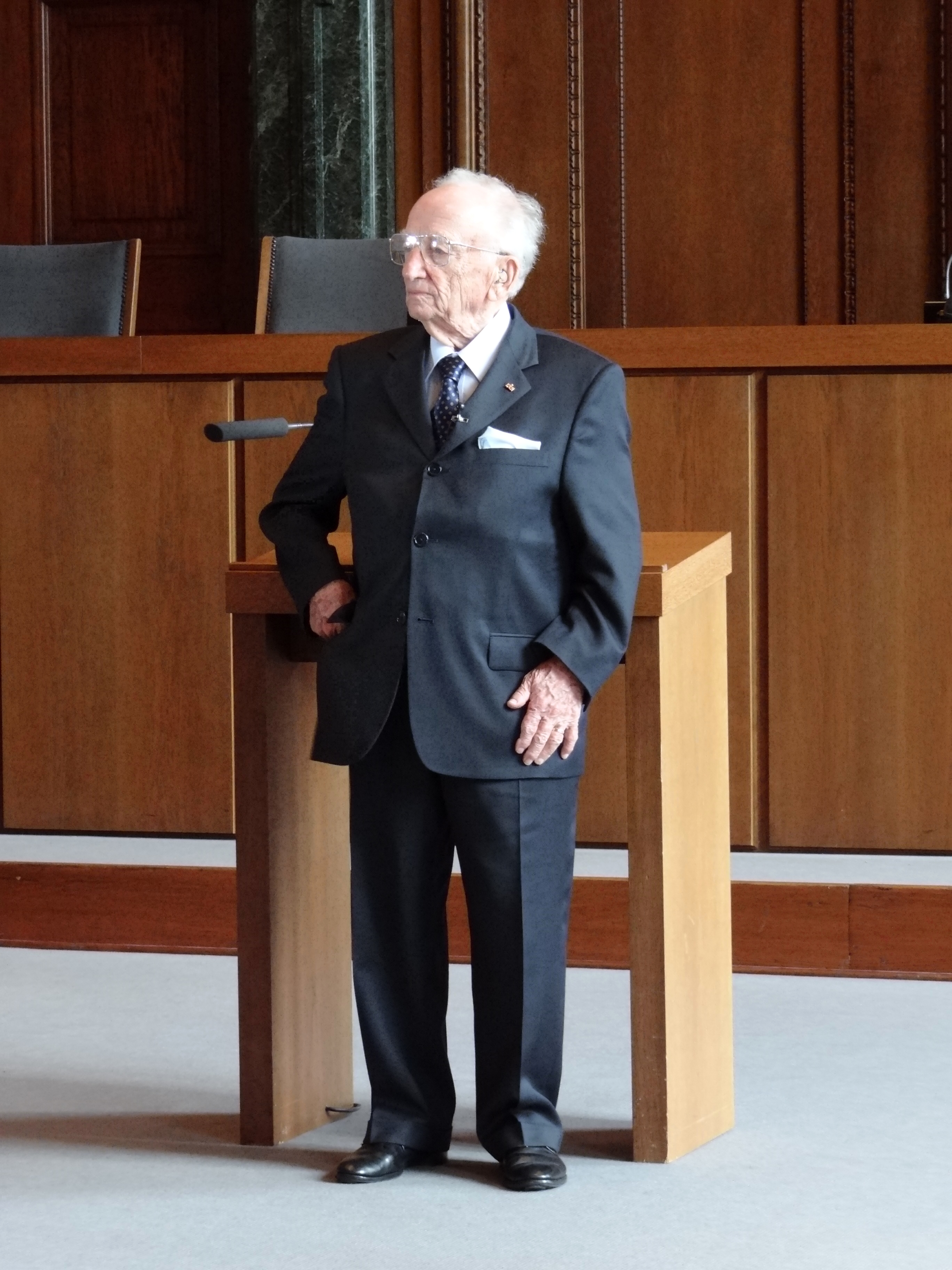
Benjamin Ferencz, chief prosecutor of the Einsatzgruppen trial, in the Palace of Justice courtroom, 2012

In May 2000, the museums of the city of Nuremberg started offering public guided tours of Courtroom 600 in the Nuremberg courthouse "Palace of Justice". In the beginning those tours only happened on weekends and enjoyed growing visitor numbers from year to year...

The tours were conducted by the historical society "Geschichte Für Alle".

The constantly increasing number of visitors led to the realisation that the associated obligation to provide appropriate historical education had to be taken seriously. In May 2005, the Board of Trustees of the Documentation Center Nazi Party Rally Grounds presented the ‘Memorium Nuremberg Trials’ project to the public for the first time. After the necessary commitments to finance the construction costs had been obtained from the Free State of Bavaria and the Federal Government, the concept for the new permanent exhibition could be drawn up in December 2007.

In December 2008, clearance, demolition, building and construction work began in the attic of the Nuremberg courthouse, which continued until 2010. On 21 November 2010, the permanent exhibition Memorium Nuremberg Trials was opened with a ceremony.

Since March 2020, Courtroom 600 has no longer been used for court hearings. It has been integrated into the permanent exhibition and is now open to visitors of the museum.

In January 2026 it was announced that the financing of an expansion of the permanent exhibition was approved by The Federal Government of Germany.

== Permanent Exhibition ==
The permanent exhibition, located in the attic of the east wing of the courthouse above Courtroom 600, provides information about the background, course and aftermath of the trials. Selected objects, such as parts of the original dock and historical audio and film documents, convey a vivid impression of the proceedings.

With a few exceptions, the exhibition design deliberately avoids the use of objects in favour of a documentary character. A factual presentation is intended to give visitors the opportunity to form their own ‘judgement’ about the confrontation with Nazi crimes. The most important exhibit is Room 600 itself.

The museum puts a particular focus on an international audience.

== Modern Day International Criminal Law ==
The exhibition also shows the direct and indirect connections between the Nuremberg Trials and modern day International Criminal Law and the creation of the International Criminal Court in The Hague. That connection is shown particularly in the installation „Zeitreise Saal 600 | Courtroom 600: Time Travel“, which was installed in Courtroom 600 in November 2022.

== Trivia ==
Russell Crowe secretly visited the museum in connection with his role in the film Nuremberg.

On 9th October 2026 Navi Pillay learned about being awarded the 2026 Nobel Peace Price while she was attending the Nuremberg Forum 2026 in Courtroom 600.
