= State Museum of Technology =

Coordinates: 53°53′38″N 11°25′52″E

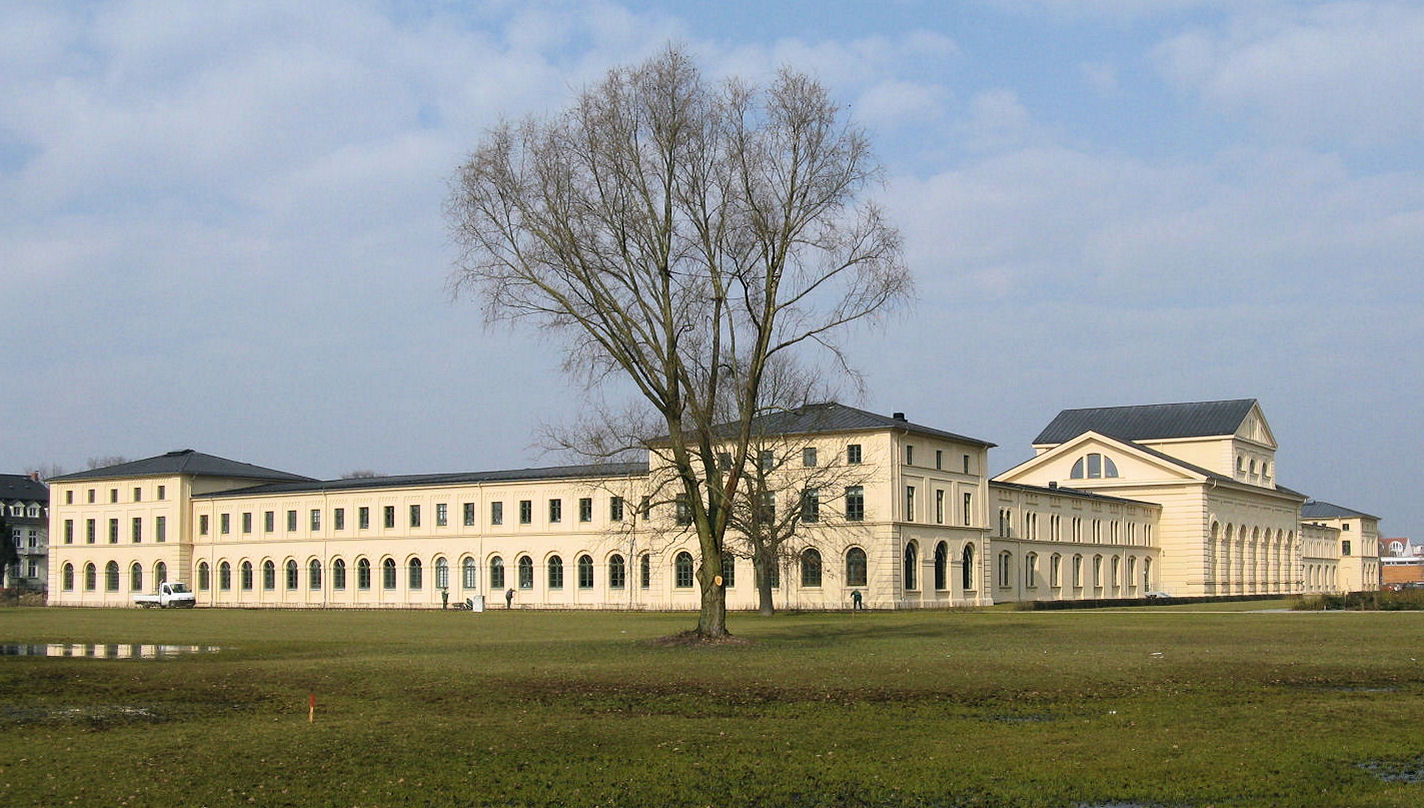
The royal stables at Schwerin Palace which housed part of the museum until 2011.

State Museum of Technology, Wismar

The Mecklenburg-Vorpommern State Museum of Technology (German: Technisches Landesmuseum Mecklenburg-Vorpommern) was founded in 1961 in Schwerin as the Polytechnic Museum (Polytechnisches Museum) and was located in several rooms within Schwerin Castle. Later, it moved to the Marstall buildings next to the castle.

Since December 2012, the technology museum is located at the Phantechnikum in the city of Wismar, 40 km north of Schwerin.
