= Bergische Museumsbahnen =

Tram museum in Germany

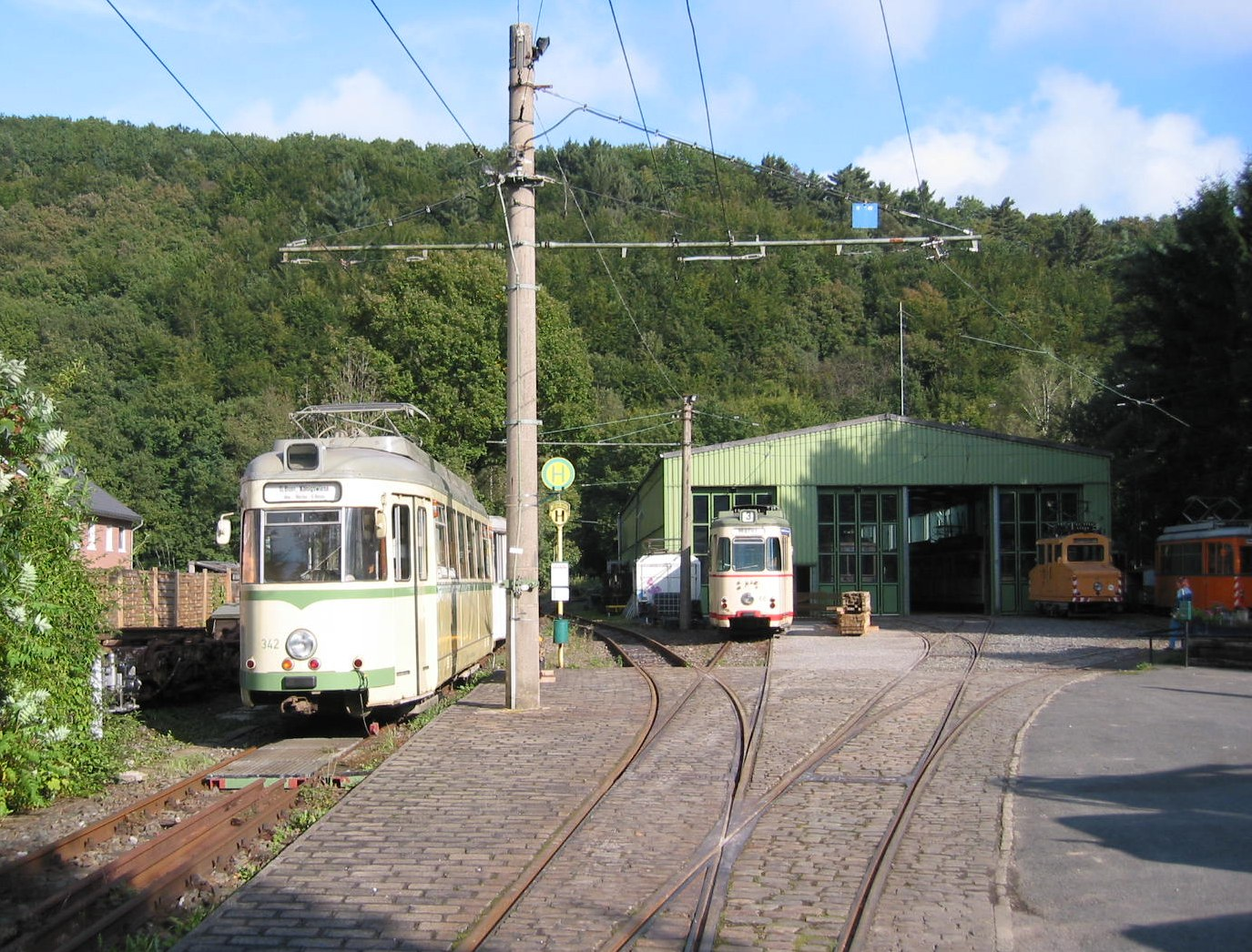
- The museum railway at the Kohlfurt bridge halt

Overview
- Coordinates: 51°11′29″N 7°6′44″E

Technical
- Track gauge: 1,000 mm (3 ft 3 3/8 in)

Bergische Museumsbahnen, Wuppertal, North Rhine-Westphalia

The Bergische Museumsbahn is a heritage tram museum situated in the German city of Wuppertal. It operates its own tram line south of Wuppertal on original rails with original cars. Therefore, it's one of the smallest running tram systems in the world. Wuppertal still operates the "Schwebebahn", a unique overhead railway.

== Museum line ==
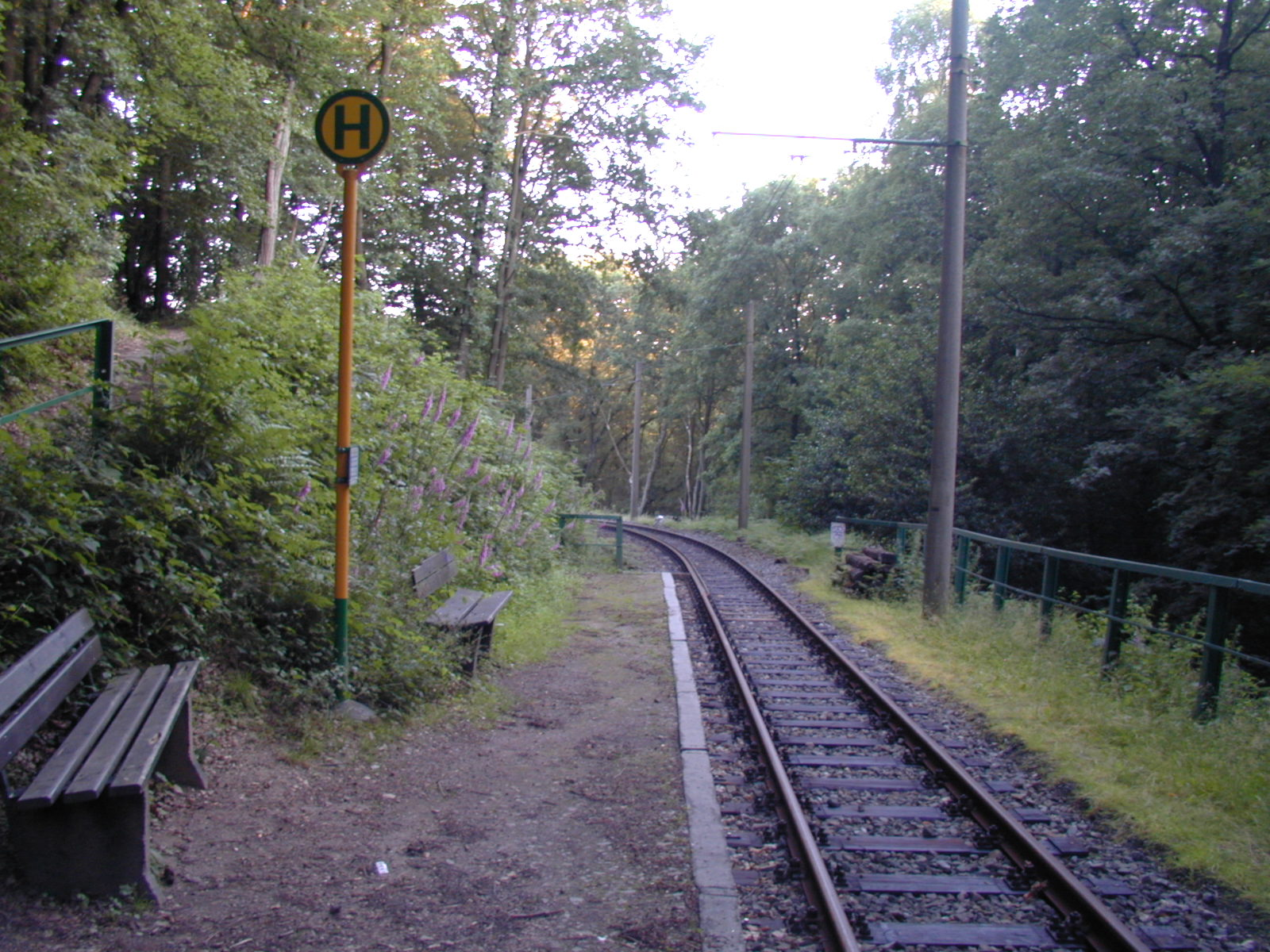
Petrikshammer halt

The museum line begins about 50 m east of the Kohlfurth bridge, where the depot may be found with its exhibition of vehicles and a bookshop. A track coming from the bridge is currently out of use. East of the depot the line winds its way south and then swings around in a 180° curve in order to follow the Kaltenbach valley north. The end of the line is currently at Greuel halt, although it has long been planned to work the section beyond that to Möschenborn.

Near Möschenborn halt the old line turns south again in order to reach Cronenberg.

The route has a height difference of about 150 metres, which means that it has an average incline of 5%. The largest part of the route cuts through a wood and is therefore typical of the former overground tramway network. On the other hand, the route does not really have any town sections. There are seven stops.

On the evening of July 14, 2021, persistent heavy rain caused the Wupper River and groundwater to rise sharply during the flood disaster. The railway depot, clubhouse, and carriage shed were affected within less than an hour. After the flood, up to 60 cm deep, receded over the next two days, a trail of devastation and stubborn mud remained. All vehicles subsequently had to be inspected and repaired. The heritage railway remained closed until April 2025. Since April 2025, it has been operating again on the announced days from April to October.

== Vehicles ==
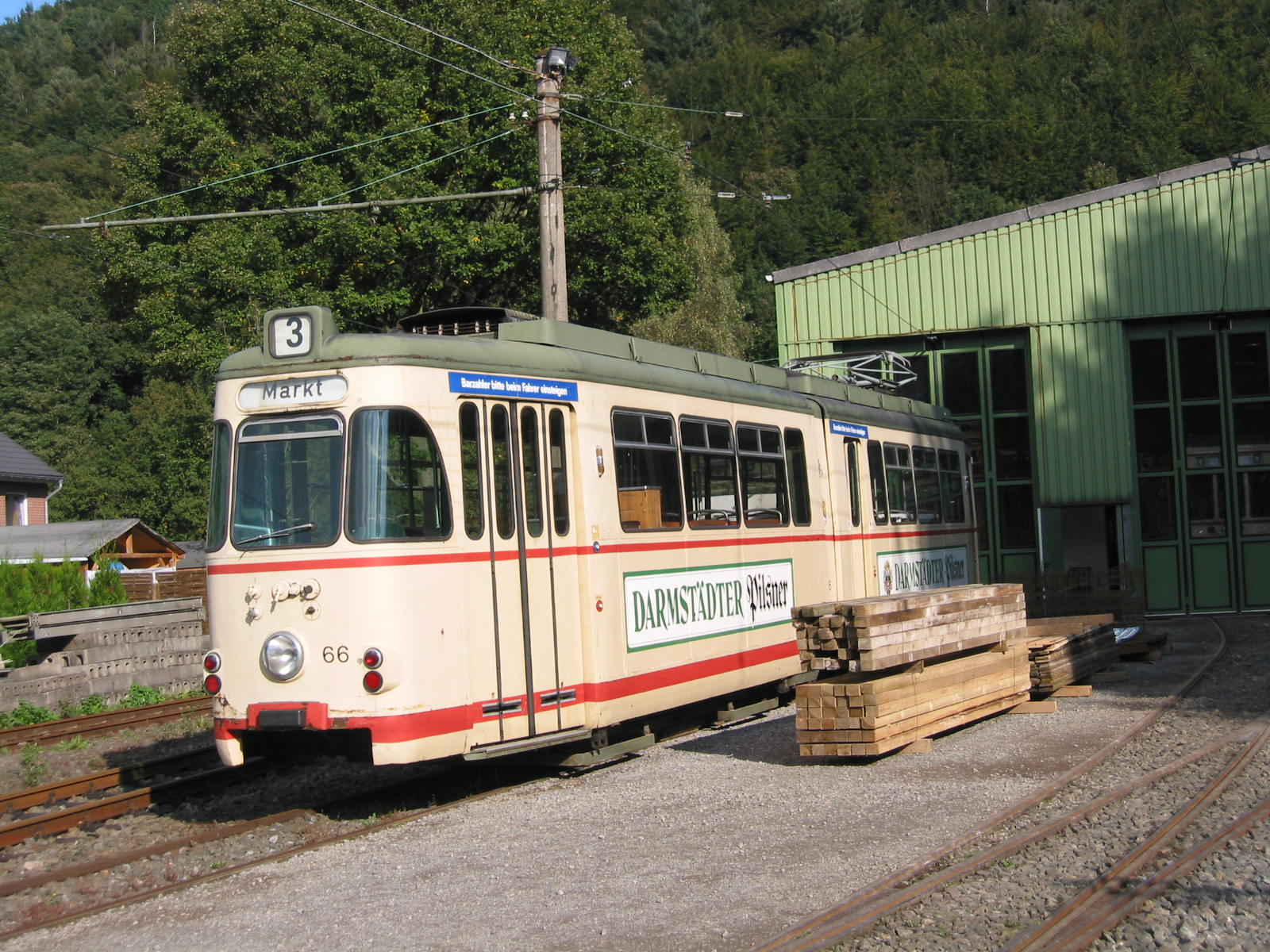
Wagon 66, formerly at Remscheid and Darmstadt

The following vehicles, amongst others, are used for services:

- Tw 105, Talbot, built 1927, formerly used in: Wuppertal
- Tw 107, DÜWAG, built 1936, formerly used in: Düsseldorf
- Tw 275, DÜWAG, built 1957, formerly used in: Bochum
- Tw 337, DÜWAG, built 1957, formerly used in: Hagen

The following vehicles are also used for maintenance:

- Grinding wagon 610 (Seidlitz & Kuschmierz, built 1950, formerly used in: Bochum)
- Tower railcar 628 (Eigenbau, built 1950, formerly used in: Wuppertal)
- Departmental wagon 406 (Rastatt, built 1951, formerly used in: Freiburg)
- Works wagon 683 (Credé, built 1952, formerly used in: Bochum)

Other vehicles are in working order, but stored and can be visited, e. g.

- Tw 106, Westwaggon, built 1960, formerly used in: Remscheid, from 1969 Darmstadt (where it was No. 66)

== Opening times and museum services ==
The museum is open all year round on Saturdays from 11 am to 5 pm, and from May to October also on Sundays from 11 am to 5 pm. Services are run from April to October on the 2nd and 4th Sundays in the month as well as on Whit Monday and Pentecost.
