= Deutsches Romantik-Museum =

Museum in Frankfurt, Germany

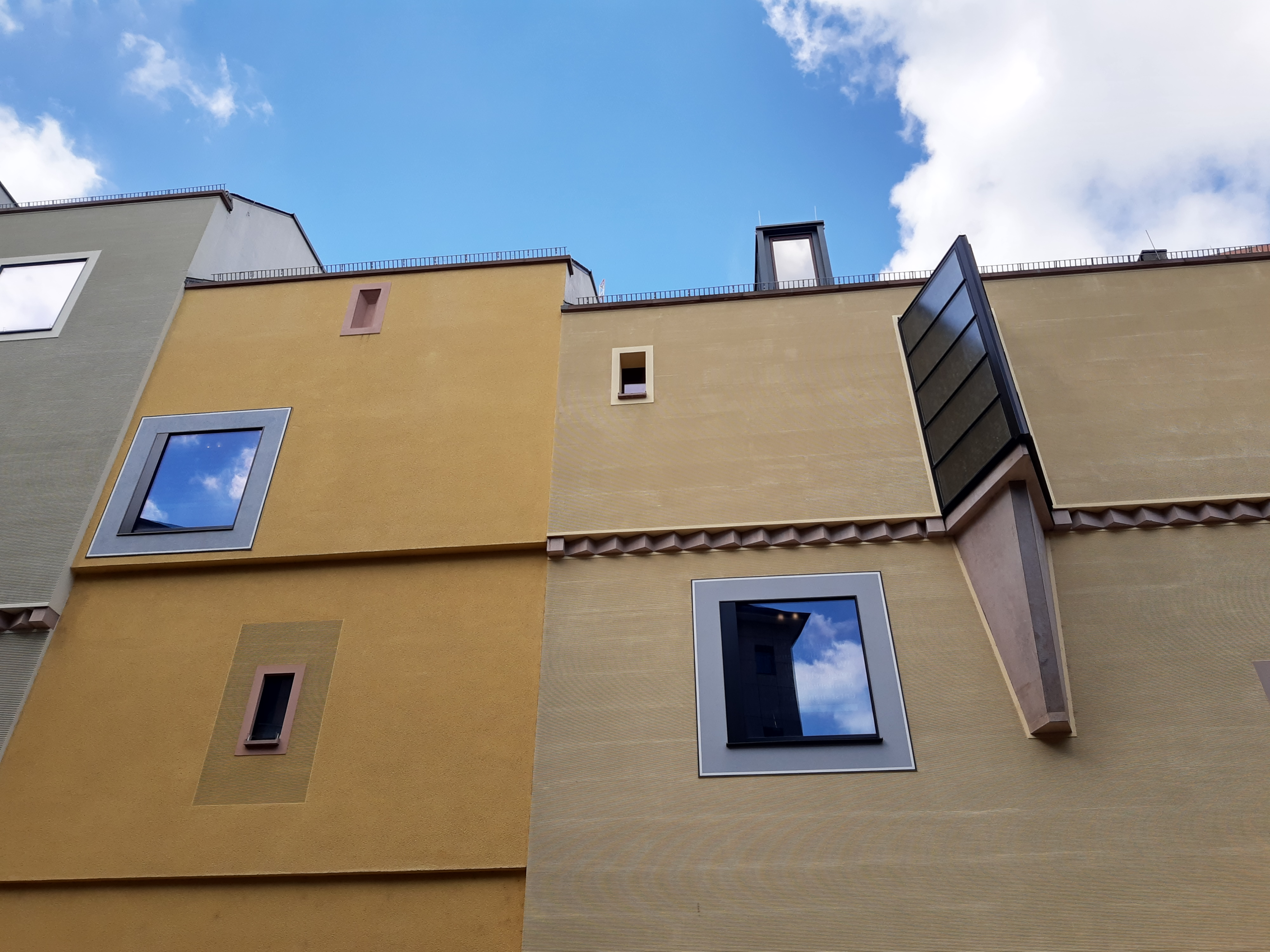
- Three-fold facade with Blauer Erker
- Established: 2021
- Location: Großer Hirschgraben 21, Museumsufer, Altstadt, Frankfurt, Germany
- Coordinates: 50°06′39″N 8°40′39″E
- Type: Culture museum
- Collections: German Romanticism
- Public transit access: Hauptwache; Hauptwache (10 min); Dom/Römer (7 min); 11, 12, 14 Karmeliterkloster
- Website: deutsches-romantik-museum.de

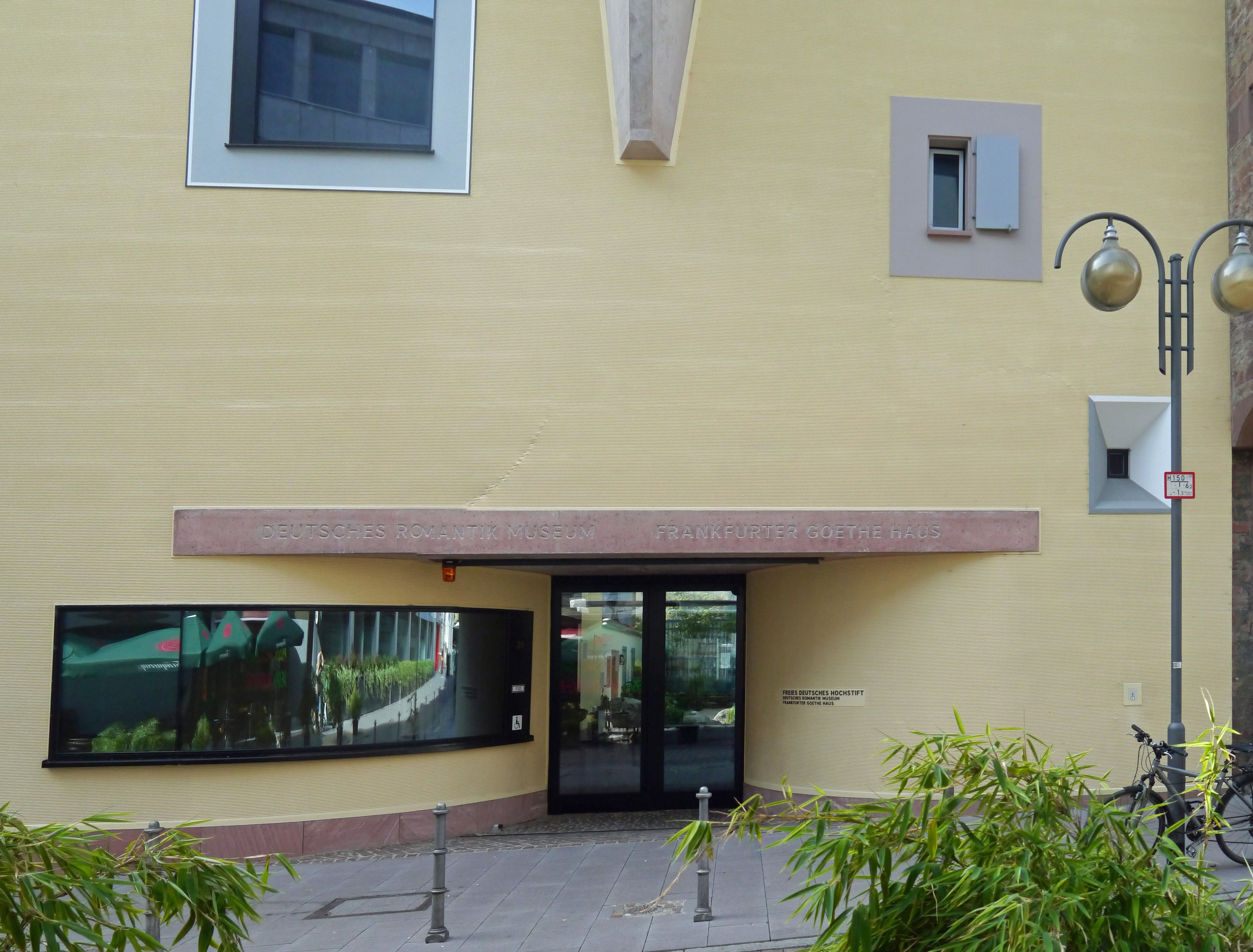
Entrance of the museum

The Deutsches Romantik-Museum is a museum dedicated to German Romanticism, located in the Innenstadt area of Frankfurt, Germany.

The museum opened in September 2021 and is managed by the Freies Deutsches Hochstift, which also operates the adjoining Goethe House. The collection consists of manuscripts, letters, paintings and other objects which the Hochstift has accumulated since 1863.

The Deutsches-Romantik Museum is the first museum of its kind, focusing on major achievements during the entire Romantic era, rather than only on a specific region or individual.

== History ==
The Freies Deutsches Hochstift was founded in 1859 with the purpose of advancing public education. Its founder, Otto Volger, acquired Goethe's birthplace for the Hochstift in 1863. The Hochstift started its collection of 18th and 19th century paintings in 1863 and its collection of Romantic material in 1911. Ernst Beutler, the Hochstift’s director from 1925 to 1960, expanded the collection by purchasing the manuscripts of Achim and Bettina von Arnim and Novalis. Beutler wanted to open a museum to display them in the house of the Brentano family in Große Sandgasse, but that building was destroyed by bombing in World War II.

In 2012, the Börsenverein des Deutschen Buchhandels departed its premises at Großer Hirschgraben 17–21 (the plot adjacent to the Goethe House), which presented the opportunity for the Hochstift to take over the property. When the city of Frankfurt withdrew from financing the project, the art dealer Karsten Greve donated 1 million Euro towards the building.

An architecture competition was initiated in October 2013, called Goethehöfe, with 15 groups invited to participate. In June 2014, three of them were awarded second prizes with the request to finish their proposals within two months. On 24 September 2014, the jury decided to combine two designs, giving the courts to the Landes & Partner, and the new museum building to Christoph Mäckler.

Construction began on 13 June 2016, and the museum opened on 14 September 2021.

The museum's permanent collection features paintings by Caspar David Friedrich and other Romantic painters. Manuscripts and letters feature prominently in the collection. The museum is unique in its focus spanning the German Romantic era as a whole and holds the largest collection related to German Romanticism worldwide.

In August 2022, the museum's first temporary exhibition opened under the name "Zeichnen im Zeitalter Goethes" ("Drawing in Goethe's Time"), which displays drawings by well-known artists such as Henry Fuseli and Johann Heinrich Wilhelm Tischbein from the Freies Deutsches Hochstift's collection.

== Architecture ==
Architect Christoph Mäckler had to solve the problem of designing a building for exhibits which required protection from exposure to light, while avoiding the creation of a windowless facade next to the historic Goethe House. His facade resembles three houses, each with one large window and an entrance. Behind the postmodern facade there is a straight staircase which rises up three floors, shielding the exhibition rooms behind it from daylight. The stairs are called Himmelstreppe ("stairway to heaven") because they appear "endless" through an optical illusion. The colour blue, symbolising the Blaue Blume of the Romantic era, dominates there and is used for other accents such as the Blauer Erker, a bay towards the street with windows of blue glass. The architecture of the new building has been described as "spectacular", while the stairway to heaven has been called "a work of art in its own right". The third floor offers a view of the Frankfurt skyline, making the Paulskirche, the Cathedral, and the European Central Bank appear as though they are positioned next to one another. The gross floor area is 3,244 m^{2} (34,920 ft^{2}) and the effective floor area is 2,080 m^{2} (22,400 ft^{2}).

== Gallery ==
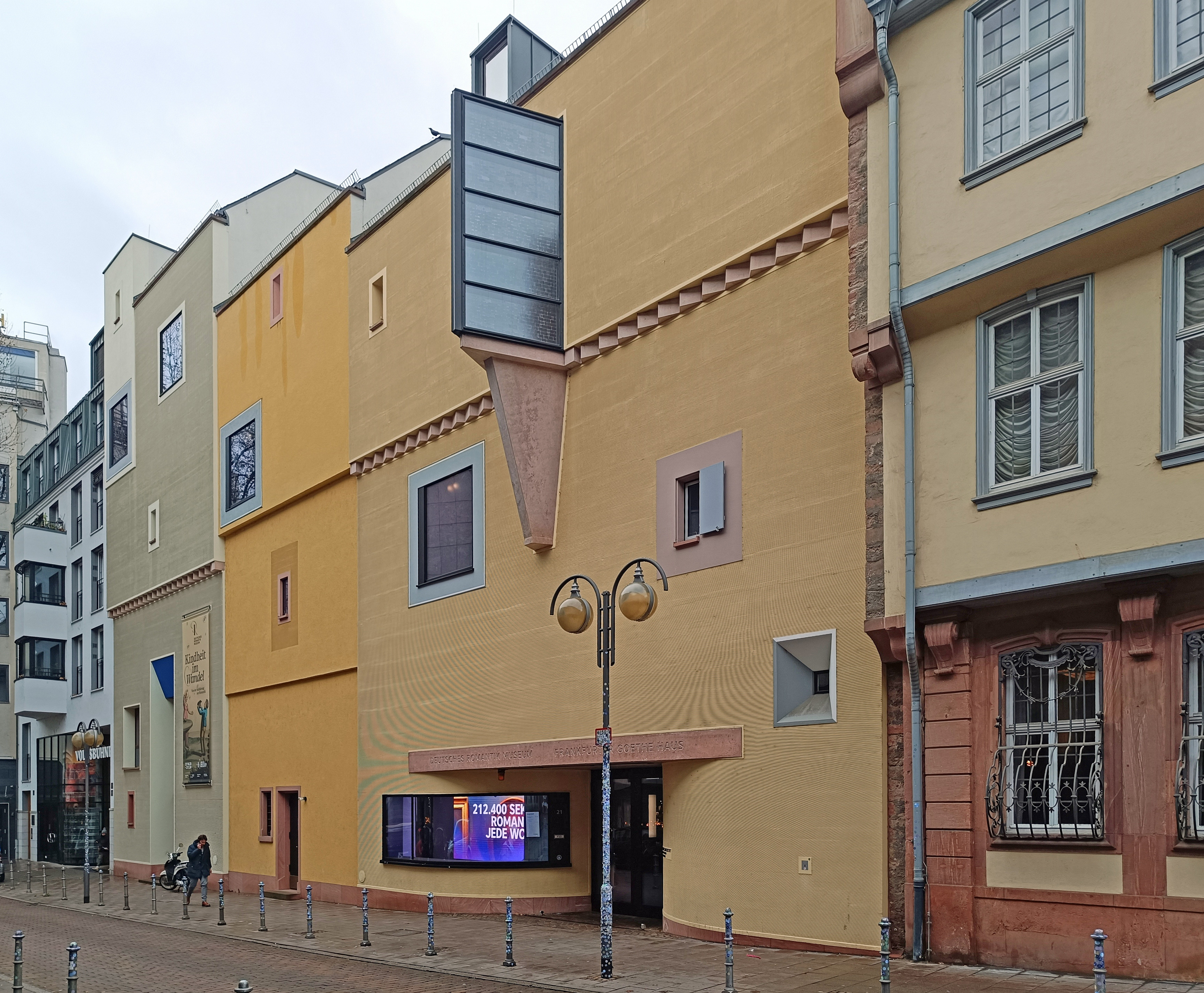
Deutsches Romantik-Museum Frankfurt

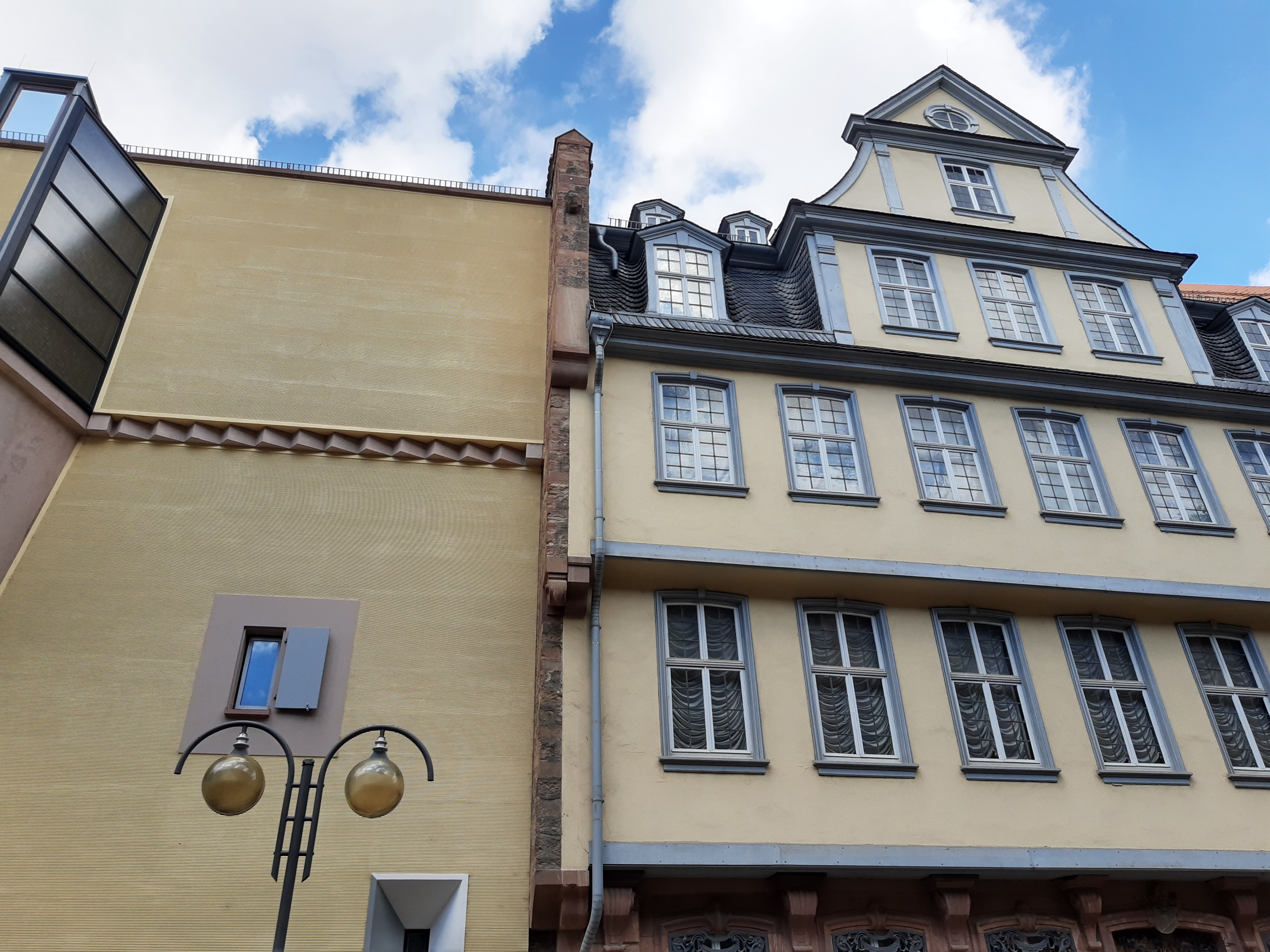
Goethe House (right) and Museum

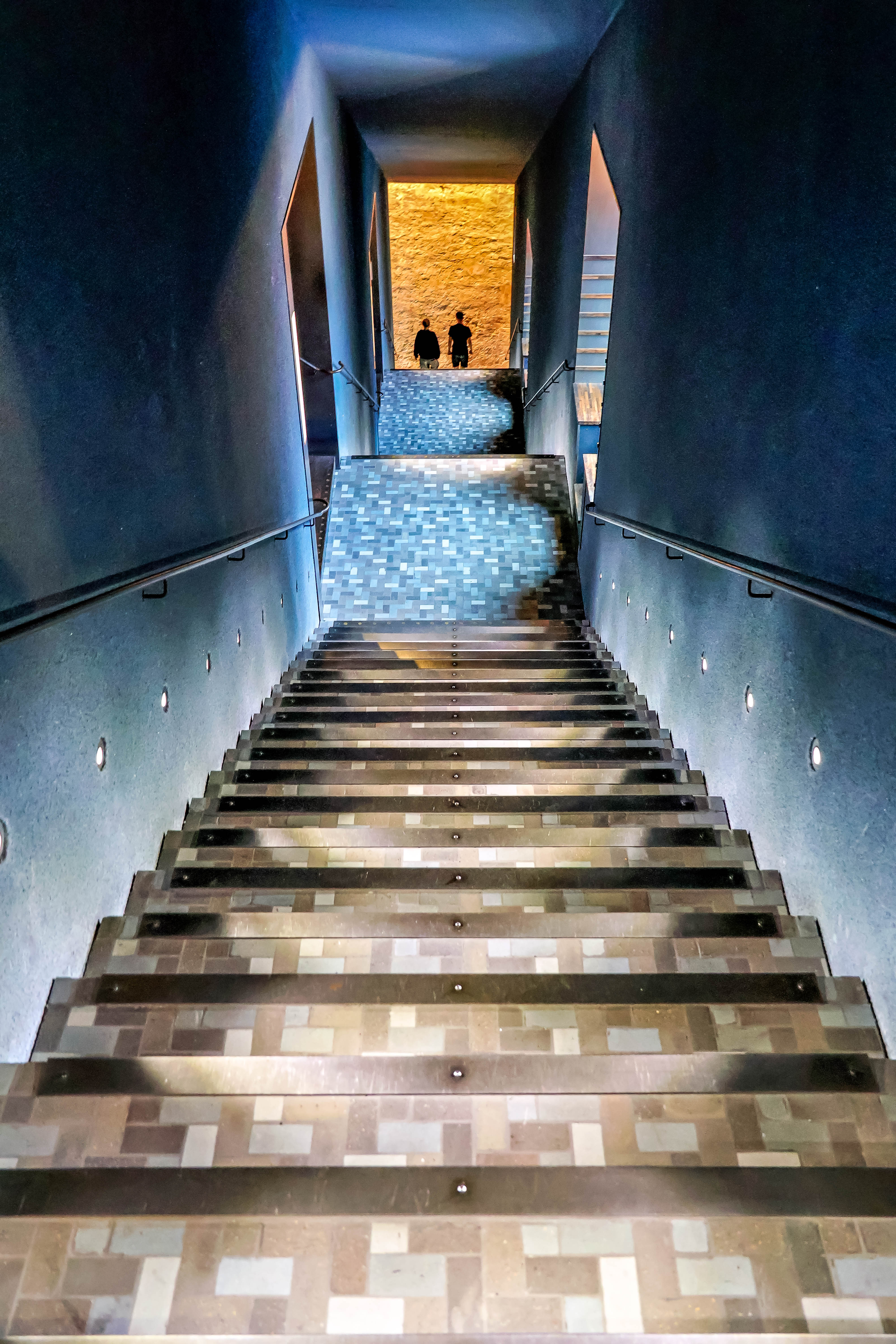
Staircase to Heaven

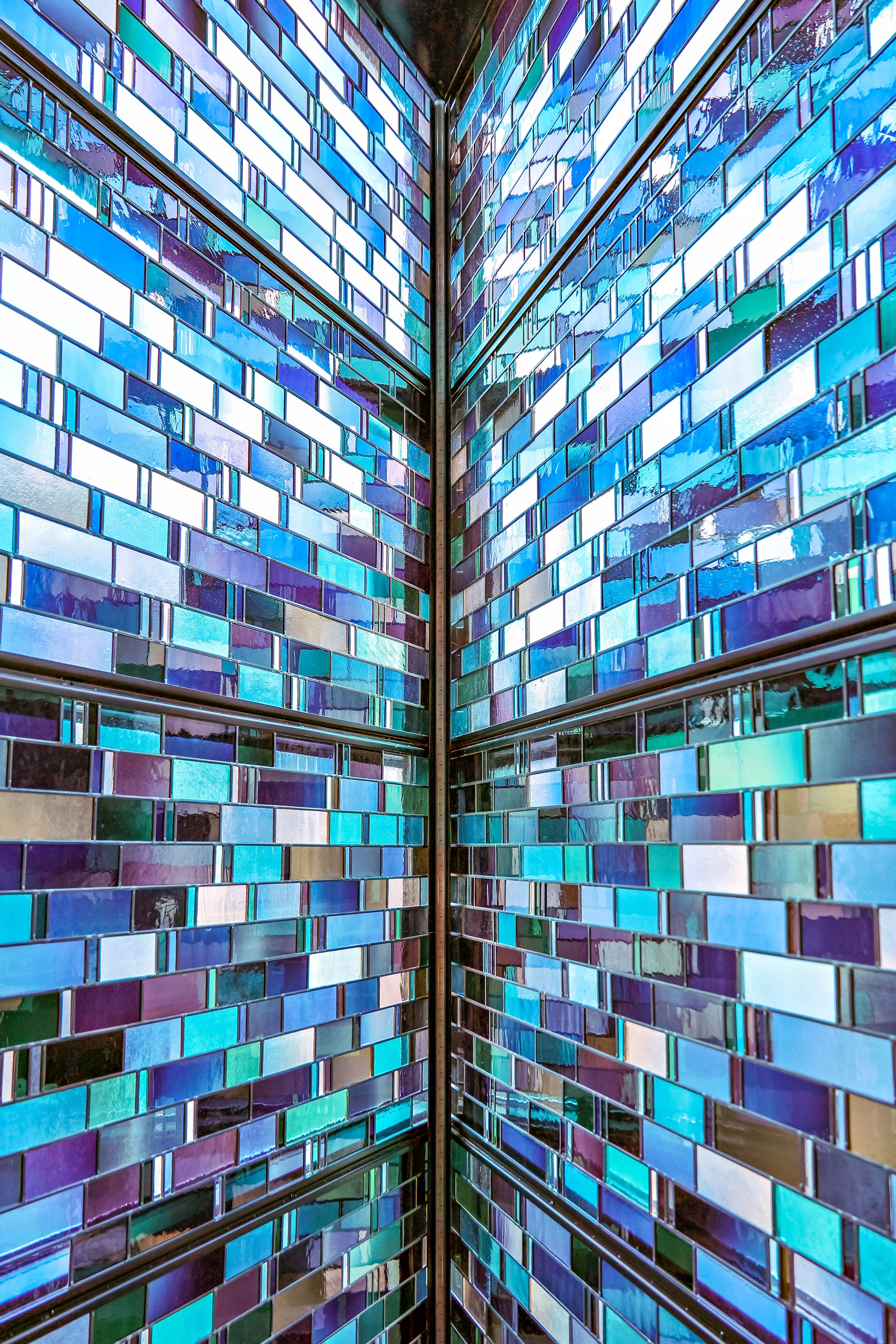
Blue Oriel Window (interior view)

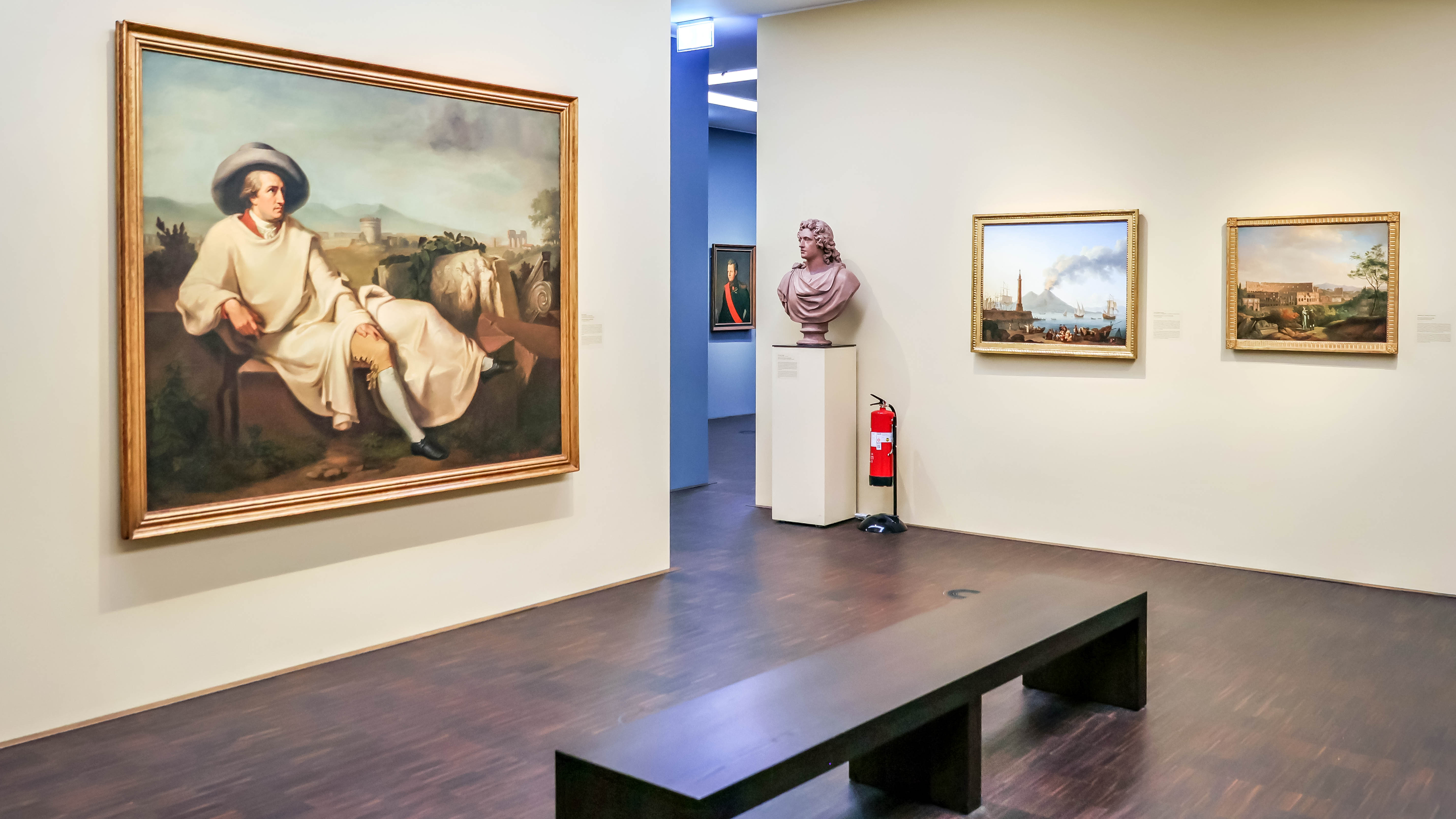
exhibition room

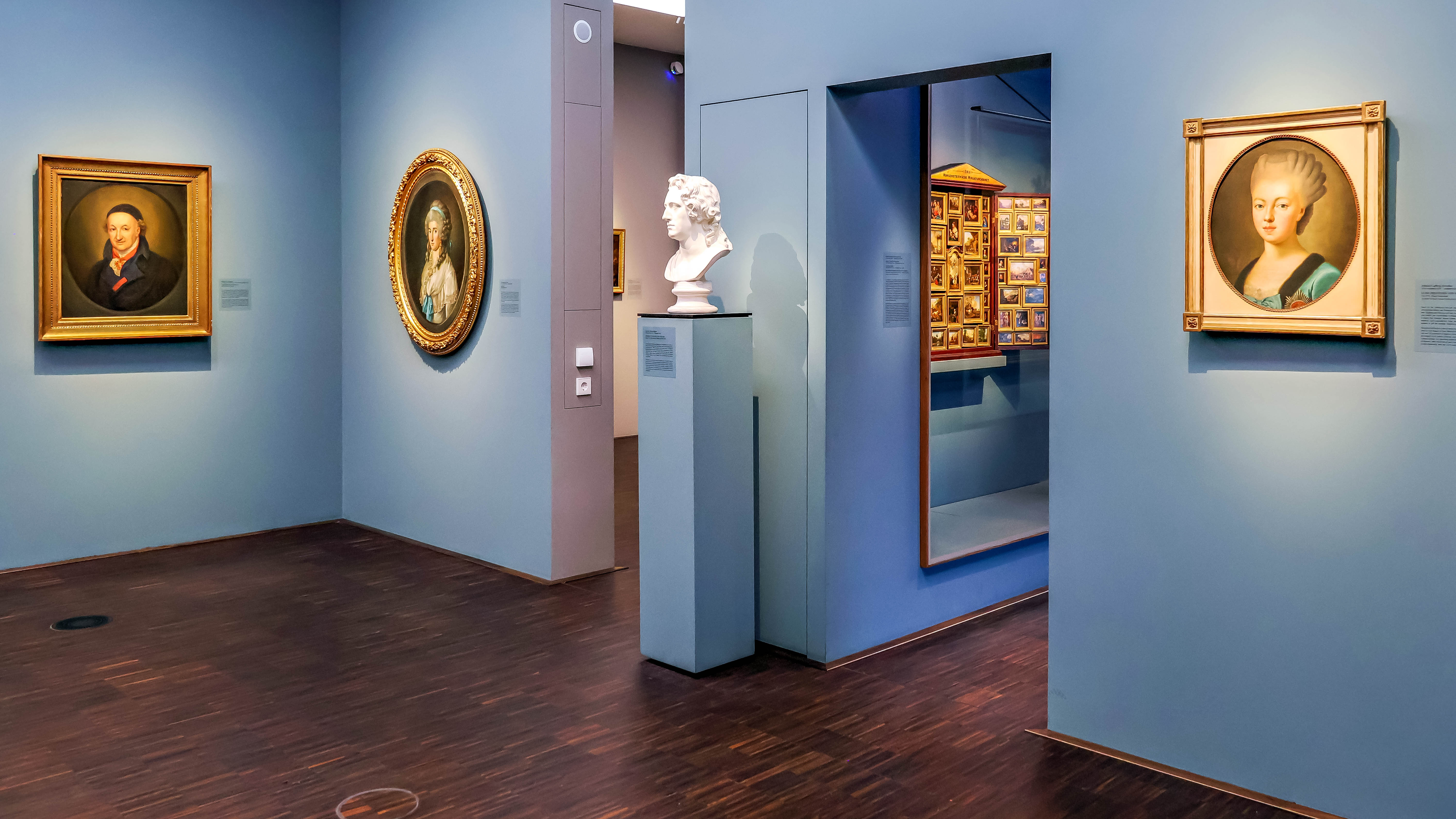
exhibition room

== See also ==
- Museumsufer
- Goethe House
