= Hessian Cultural Prize =

German award

- Awarded for: special achievements in art, science and cultural mediation
- Sponsored by: Government of Hesse
- Location: Hesse
- Country: Germany
- Reward: 45,000 Euro
- Website: Official website

The Hessian Cultural Prize (German: Hessischer Kulturpreis) is an annual German culture prize awarded by the Government of Hesse. The prize was established in 1982. With a trophy of 60,000 German marks, now 45,000 Euro, it is currently the highest endowed culture prize in Germany.

== Recipients ==
- 1982 – Eugen Kogon (political scientist); Thomas Michael Mayer (chairman, Georg Büchner Association)
- 1983 – Karl Krolow (lyricist); Hans-Jürgen von Bose (composer); Ror Wolf (author)
- 1984 – Bernard Schultze (painter); Albert Mangelsdorff (jazz trombonist)
- 1985 – Michael Gielen (conductor and composer); Ludwig Denecke and Heinz Rölleke (German philologists)
- 1986 – Karl Dedecius (translator); D. E. Sattler (Hölderlin scholar)
- 1987 – Volker Schlöndorff (film director); E. R. Nele (sculptor); Ev Grüger (painter)
- 1988 – Gabriele Wohmann (author)
- 1989 – Adolf Dresen (film director); Judith Rosenbauer (actor)
- 1990 – Horst Krüger (novelist); Egbert Strolka (Tänzer und Ballettmeister)
- 1991 – Horst Antes (painter und sculptor); Helmut Burmeister (museum director); Gerd J. Grein (museum director)
- 1992 – Eilke Brigitte Helm (physician); Marcel Ophüls (documentary director); Ensemble Modern
- 1993 – Hans-Albert Walter (philologist); F. K. Waechter (author); Heiner Goebbels (composer)
- 1994 – Lucius Burckhardt and Annemarie Burckhardt (sociologists); Peter Urban (translator); Adelheid Hoffmann and Hans-Jürgen „Slu“ Slusallek (galerists)
- 1995 – Margret Stuffmann (museum director); William Forsythe (choreographer); Karlheinz Braun (publicist)
- 1996 – Klaus Reichert (anglicist); Klappmaul Theater (youth theater company); Walter Boehlich (author and translator)
- 1997 – Odo Marquard (philosopher); Anna Viebrock (scenic designer); Ute Gerhard (sociologist, gender studies)
- 1998 – Wolf Singer (neuroscientist); Thomas Bayrle (painter); Mischka Popp and Thomas Bergmann (director)
- 1999 – Jürgen Habermas (philosopher); Marcel Reich-Ranicki (literary critic); Siegfried Unseld (publisher)
- 2000 – Barbara Klemm (photographer); Helga Fanderl (film director); José Luis Encarnação (information scientist)
- 2001 – Gottfried Kiesow (historic preservator); Paul Posenenske, Berthold Penkhues and Christoph Mäckler (architects)
- 2002 – Tabea Zimmermann (violist); Hans Zender (composer and conductor); Internationales Musikinstitut Darmstadt
- 2003 – Florian Illies (publicist); Nicolaus Schafhausen (curator); Til Schweiger (actor)
- 2004 – Andrea Breth (film director); Jürgen Holtz (actor); Klaus Völker (dramaturge)
- 2005 – no award
- 2006 – Christine Schäfer (soprano); Christoph Prégardien (tenor); Lothar Zagrosek (conductor)
- 2007 – René Block (galerist); Klaus Gallwitz and Klaus Herding (arts historians)
- 2008 – Wolfgang Diefenbach (orchestra director); Albrecht Beutelspacher (mathematician); Kindertheaterbürooo Kassel (Stefan Becker, Günter Staniewski)
- 2009 – Salomon Korn (Jewish community leader); Karl Lehmann (Cardinal); Peter Steinacker (former Protestant church leader); Navid Kermani (author, Islam scholar) rejected: Fuat Sezgin (Islam scholar)
- 2010 – Rebecca Horn (visual artist)
- 2011 – Dieter Rams (designer); F. C. Gundlach (photographer); Gunter Rambow (visual artist)
- 2012 – Hilmar Hoffmann (former president of the Goethe-Institut)
- 2013 – Wolf D. Prix (architect)
- 2014 – Peter Härtling (author)
- 2015 – Artistic directors of documenta I–XIII
- 2016 – Andreas Scholl (countertenor) and Tamar Halperin (harpsichordist and pianist)
- 2017 – Volker Mosbrugger (paleontologist) and Matthias Lutz-Bachmann (philosoph)
- 2018 – Margareta Dillinger and Johnny Klinke (Tigerpalast Frankfurt); Regina Oehler–van Gemmeren (science journalist hr), Andreas Platthaus (journalist FAZ) and Heike Schmoll (political correspondent FAZ)
- 2019 – Wolfgang Lorch and Andrea Wandel (Wandel Lorch Architekten, architects)
- 2020 – Caricatura Museum Frankfurt and Caricatura Gallery in Kassel
- 2021 – Sandra Ciesek and Mai Thi Nguyen-Kim
- 2022 – Anne Bohnenkamp-Renken (director Freies Deutsches Hochstift)
- 2023 – Bernd Loebe (intendant Oper Frankfurt)
- 2024 – Mirjam Wenzel (director Jewish Museum Frankfurt)
- 2025 – Frankfurt Radio Symphony
