= Hans Bohnenkamp =

German educationalist (1893–1977)

Hans Bohnenkamp (1893–1977) was a German teacher and educationalist.

== Early and personal life ==
Bohnenkamp was born in Schildesche near Bielefeld in 1893. The family moved to Minden in 1899, where his father took a job as a school headmaster. In Minden Hans attended the humanist gynasium. After completing his Abitur in 1912, he studied mathematics, physics, philosophy and pedagogy at Marburg University and graduated in 1914.

During his school days, Bohnenkamp was a member of the anti-industrialist Wandervogel movement, while at university he joined the Akademische Vereinigung Marburg and took part in the First Free German Youth Day in October 1913. From the 1914 summer semester, Bohnenkamp transferred to the University of Göttingen before his studies were interrupted by the First World War; Bohnenkamp served as an artillery officer, volunteering for the army on 11 August 1914. During the war, Bohnenkamp was awarded the Iron Cross First and Second Class as well as the Ritterkreuz of the House Order of Hohenzollern.

In July 1923 Bohnenkamp was married to Liselotte Fischer, who was also a teacher. They had four children, one of whom, Johanna, also became a teacher.

Bohnenkamp's granddaughter Anne Bohnenkamp-Renken is an academic of German studies and the director of the Freies Deutsches Hochstift in Frankfurt.

== Career ==
After the war, Bohnenkamp completed his teaching exams at the University of Marburg before training at the Gymnasium in Minden until 1921. He then worked as a teacher in gymnasiums in Rotterdam, Unna and Bremen. Bohnenkamp was made Professor of Pedagogy and Philosophy at the Pedagogical Academy in Frankfurt (Oder) in 1932, and taught at the University for Teacher Training in Cottbus from 1934 to 1939.

In 1933 Bohnenkamp joined the Sturmabteilung (SA) and in 1937 he became a member of the Nazi Party. During the Second World War, Bohnenkamp was the commander of a school for artillery officers. From 1942 he served as a Major in the reserves before becoming the head of an artillery regiment on the Eastern Front. On 22 January 1943, Bohnenkamp was awarded the Knight's Cross of the Iron Cross for his leadership of his regiment in the Battle of Stalingrad.

At the end of the war, Bohnenkamp was the military leader of the Panzerwaffe school in Bergen. It was here that he was taken by the British as a prisoner of war in Spring 1945; he spent the remaining months of the war in a prison in Ostend, Belgium.

In 1946, Bohnenkamp was tasked with founding a new teacher training university in Lower Saxony; in that year he became the founder and director of the newly founded Adolf Reichwein University Celle in Celle. Adolf Reichwein was a close personal friend to Bohnenkamp up until his execution by the Nazis in 1944, and Bohnenkamp was instrumental in having the school named after him. Bohnenkamp led the university from its foundation until it moved to Osnabrück in 1953. He continued to teach at the university until his retirement in 1958.

== Political views and relationship with Helmut Schmidt ==
Although he was both a member of the Nazi Party and a decorated veteran of both World Wars, Bohnenkamp was an opponent of Nazi politics; in a lecture he gave at Ostend in 1945, he sharply criticised the Nazi system.

This speech was attended by Bohnenkamp's fellow prisoner Helmut Schmidt, who would later serve as Chancellor of West Germany from 1974 to 1982. Later in his life, Schmidt reported that Bohnenkamp had a great influence on his decision to enter politics with the SPD:

He was a wonderful man, Hans Bohnenkamp, a university professor fifteen years my senior, decorated up to the neck with oak leaf clusters and all that. He was a religious socialist, and one who believed to have carried out his duty as a soldier. He didn't only teach me what democracy is, he made me a socialist.

— Schmidt in a 2001 interview

Bohnenkamp himself joined the SPD in 1945/46.

== Sources ==
Alphei, Hartmut (2015). "Hans Bohnenkamp". Mitteilungen des Mindener Geschichtsvereins (87): 51–67.
