= Karl Nikolaus Berg =

German politician from Frankfurt

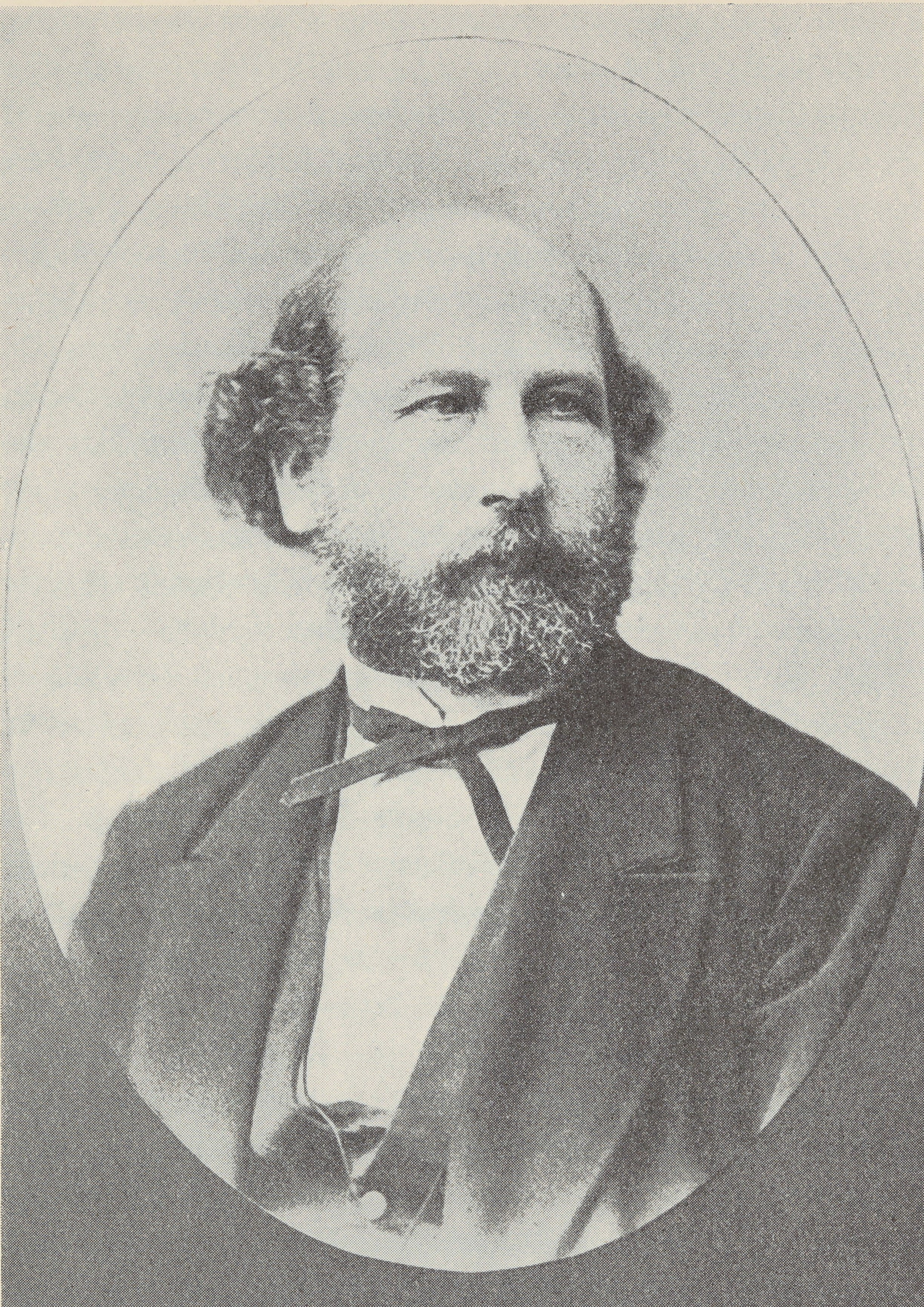
Dr. Karl Nikolaus Berg

Karl Nikolaus Berg (28 March 1826 - 26 January 1887) was a German politician from Frankfurt.

== Biography ==
Berg was born to surgeon and military doctor Johann Gerhard Wilhelm Philipp and his wife Josephine Johanna Berg. Berg became a lawyer in 1850 and was a notary from 1861. He became a senator in Frankfurt in 1865, and was named the second "Bürgermeister" of Frankfurt in 1868.

Berg was a long time member of the Freies Deutsches Hochstift association, and took over from Otto Volger as its chairman in 1881. He held this position until retirement in November 1885. He was succeeded by Otto Heuer.

Berg died in 1887 aged 51.

== Sources ==
- Adler, Fritz (1959). Freies Deutsches Hochstift. Seine Geschichte 1859-1885 (in German).
- Seng, Joachim (2009). Goethe-**Enthusiasmus und Bürgersinn. Das Freie Deutsche Hochstift - rankfurt Goethe-Museum 1881-1960 (in German). Göttingen: Wallstein Verlag. ISBN 978-3-8353-0536-6.
