= Otto Volger =

German geologist from Lüneburg (1822–1897)

- Born: Georg Heinrich Otto Volger; 30 January 1822
- Died: 18 October 1897 (aged 75); Sulzbach am Main, German Empire
- Education: University of Göttingen (PhD)
- Occupation: Geologist

Georg Heinrich Otto Volger (30 January 1822 – 18 October 1897) was a German geologist from Lüneburg. He was the founder and first chairman of the Freies Deutsches Hochstift, which he led from 1859 to 1882.

== Life ==
Volger was born to Wilhelm Friedrich Volger, a teacher and school director in Lüneburg, and his wife Rosalie Franziska, on 30 January 1822. After attending the Johanneum gymnasium, Volger began studying law at the University of Göttingen in 1842, but changed in 1843 to study natural sciences. Volger obtained his PhD in geology from Gottingen in 1845. Volger was a member of the Corps Hannovera Göttingen during his studies.

Volger was a supporter of the German revolutions of 1848–1849, and was the president of the Democratic Club of Göttingen. In early 1849, Volger was forced to flee Germany to Switzerland after an investigation was opened against him following a violent riot at Plesse Castle.

In Switzerland, he first taught classes in natural history at the Muri monastery in Aargau, before becoming a professor of natural history at the ETH Zurich in 1851, where he worked primarily on the history of earthquakes. Volger returned to Germany in 1856, and held a position teaching geology and mineralogy at the Senckenberg Nature Research Society.

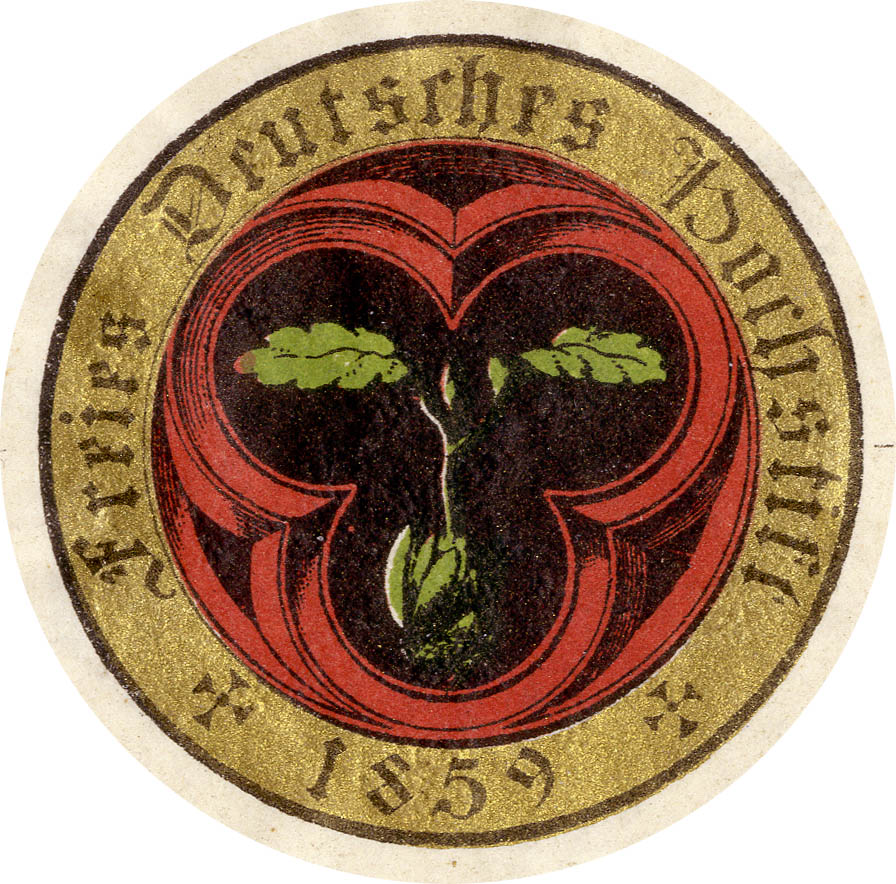
1859 seal of the Freies Deutsches Hochstift with the black, red and gold colours of the Frankfurt Parliament.

On 10 November 1859, the 100th birthday of Friedrich Schiller, Volger founded the Freies Deutsches Hochstift, an association for general education located in Frankfurt. Otto Volger became the Hochstift's first Obmann" ("chairman").

Volger founded the Hochstift to be a ""Bundestag" of the German spirit", a place where those who held the pan-German ideas of the 1848 revolution were to find a spiritual and cultural home. This sentiment was reflected in the original seal of the association, which featured the black, red and gold colours of the Frankfurt Parliament. The Hochstift was to hold lectures and run courses for its members, as well as providing a library.

In 1863, Volger purchased the Goethe House, the birthplace of Johann Wolfgang von Goethe, for the Freies Deutsches Hochstift, which he opened in 1864 as the first public memorial site to Goethe. Volger meticulously converted the house to a reconstruction of the condition left by Goethe's father.

Volger served as the "Obmann" ("chairman") of the Hochstift from its inception until 1881; by the late 1870s he had begun to fall out of favour with the others members of the Hochstift, primarily due to differences over the future of the Hochstift. Volger was replaced by Karl Nikolaus Berg, a lawyer and politician who had served in the Frankfurt government. Volger was expelled from the Hochstift in 1882 after attacking members of the administration in open letters.

After 1882, Volger focused on his academic research, and moved to Bad Soden. In 1892, he moved to Sulzbach, where he died on 18 October 1897.

== Legacy ==
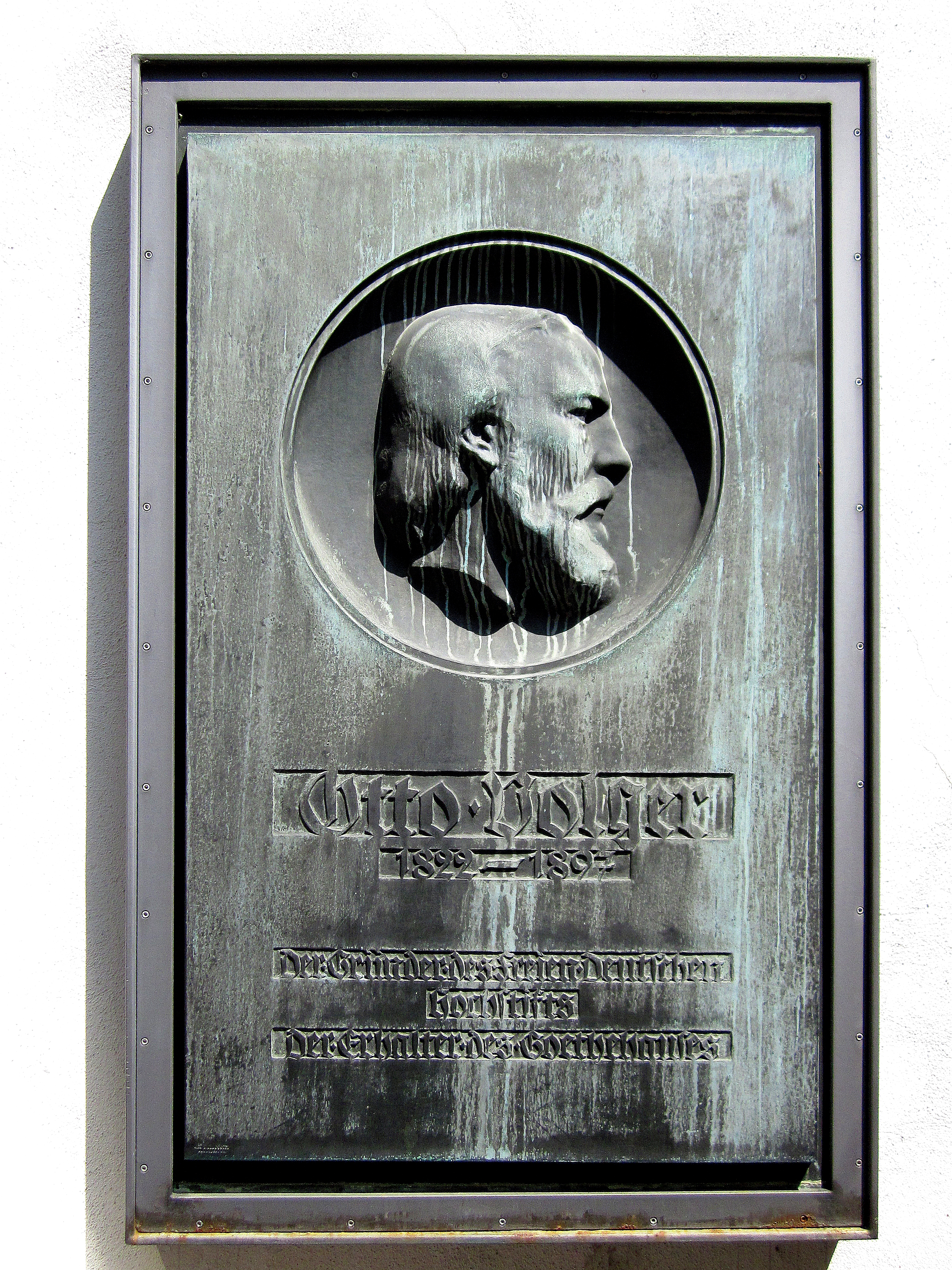
Plaque commemorating Otto Volger's contributions to the Freies Deutsches Hochstift. The plaque is currently located at the Hochstift's entrance.

When Volger died in 1897, he was not mentioned at all in the Hochstift's yearbook; he was first honoured by the Hochstift in 1934, when the then-director Ernst Beutler erected a bronze plaque in his honour in the Goethe House. A memorial stone was also placed on Volger's grave in Frankfurt Main Cemetery, noting his contribution to the Freies Deutsches Hochstift.

Volger made contributions in the fields of mineralogy and crystallography, and was particularly interested in earthquakes. He did extensive study of earthquakes in Switzerland; researching their origins, periodicity, meteorological and environmental factors, as well as the spread and expansion of the quakes.

== Selected works ==
- Studien zur Entwicklungsgeschichte der Mineralien als Grundlage einer wissenschaftlichen Geologie und rationellen Mineralchemie, 1854
- Die Entwicklungsgeschichte der Mineralien der Talkglimmer-Familie und ihrer Verwandten, 1855
- Versuch einer Monographie des Borazites, 1855
- Untersuchungen über das Phänomen der Erdbeben in der Schweiz, 1857
- Goethe's Vaterhaus: ein Beitrag zu des Dichters Entwicklungsgeschichte, 1863

== Sources ==
- Adler, Fritz (1959). Freies Deutsches Hochstift. Seine Geschichte 1859–1885 (in German).
- Hodgson, Petra Hagen (1997). Wandlung, Verwandlungen. Zur Arkitektur-Geschichte der Frankfurter Goethe-Stätten (in German). Frankfurt: Freies Deutsches Hochstift. pp. 52–78.
- Maisak, Petra; Dewitz, Hans-Georg (2018). Das Goethe-Haus in Frankfurt am Main (in German) (6th ed.). Frankfurt: Insel Verlag. ISBN 978-3-458-33925-0.
- Perels, Christoph (1994). Das Frankfurter Goethe-Museum zu Gast im Städel (in German). Mainz: Verlag Hermann Schmidt. pp. 8–17. ISBN 3-87439-311-9.
- Perels, Christoph (1998). Das Freie Deutsche Hochstift - Frankfurter Goethe-Museum. Memorialstätte. Kulturinstitut. Forschungsstätte (in German).
- Rumpf, Hermann (1938). Aus der Geschichte des Freien Deutschen Hochstifts (in German). Frankfurt: Freies Deutsches Hochstift.
- Sakurai, Ayako (2013). Science and Societies in Frankfurt am Main. Pickering and Chatto. ISBN 978-1-84893-397-2.
- Stumm, Alexander (2017). Architektonische Konzepte der Rekonstruktion (in German). Birkhäuser. pp. 161–166. ISBN 978-3-0356-1349-0.
