= Detlev Lüders =

German academic

Director of the Freies Deutsches Hochstift
- In office 1 March 1963 – 1982
- Preceded by: Ernst Beutler
- Succeeded by: Christoph Perels

Personal details
- Born: 1 November 1929
- Died: 9 August 2012 (aged 82)

Detlev Lüders (1 November 1929 — 9 August 2012) was a German academic who served as the director of the Freies Deutsches Hochstift between 1963 and 1982.

== Life ==
Lüders was born in Hamburg on 1 November 1929. He attended the Hamburger Landeskunstschule, studying art. He transferred to the University of Hamburg in 1948, where he studied literature and art history. In 1953, as a doctoral student, Lüders wrote to Martin Heidegger, arguing "I do not understand how a text can be based on its interpretation" and Heidegger replied, asking "Is there a text in itself?". Lüders received his doctorate in 1958, and joined the Freies Deutsches Hochstift as a curator the same year.

After the death of Ernst Beutler in 1960, Lüders served as an interim director of the Freies Deutsches Hochstift, until he was elected as director by the Hochstift's administrative committee on 1 March 1963.

As director, Lüders oversaw the opening of a museum to Goethe in Rome, which opened in 1973 and was controlled by the Hochstift until its closure 1982. The museum was re-opened in 1997 as the Casa di Goethe, but without the Hochstift's involvement.

Under Lüders the Hochstift began producing its critical editions of Hugo von Hoffmannsthal and Clemens Brentano. The critical edition of Hugo von Hofmannsthal, of which the first volume was published in 1975, was completed in 2022; the Clemens Brentano edition is not yet finished. Lüders retired from the Hochstift for health reasons on 30 September 1982 after 19 years as director. He was replaced by Dr. Arthur Henkel on a temporary basis until his successor, Christoph Perels, was selected.

Lüders died on 9 August 2012, aged 82.

== Sources ==
- "Jahresbericht 1862". Jahrbuch des Freien Deutschen Hochstifts 1963 (in German). 1963. pp. 539–585.
- "Jahresbericht 1963". Jahrbuch des Freien Deutschen Hochstifts 1964 (in German). 1964. pp. 423–464.
- "Jahresbericht 1982". Jahrbuch des Freien Deutschen Hochstifts 1983 (in German). 1983. pp. 347–384.
- Lüders, Detlev (1975). "Das Goethe-Museum des Freien Deutschen Hochstifts in Rom. Bericht über seine Gründung am 29. Oktober 1973". Jahrbuch des Freien Deutschen Hochstifts (in German). Tübingen: Max Niemeyer Verlag. pp. 377–393.
