= Christoph Perels =

German academic

- Born: 12 May 1938 (age 88); Rehfelde, Nazi Germany
- Education: University of Göttingen (PhD)
- Occupation: Academic
- Spouse: Maie Leppik (m. 1966)

Christoph Perels (born 12 May 1938) is a German academic who served as director of the Freies Deutsches Hochstift literary association between 1983 and his retirement in 2003.

== Life ==
Christoph Perels was born in Rehfelde on 12 May 1938. He married Maie Leppik in 1966. Perels studied philology, history and philosophy at the universities of Erlangen, Kiel and Paris before receiving his PhD from the University of Göttingen in 1974 with a thesis on the perception of Rococo poetry 1740–1760. He then began teaching at the Technical University of Braunschweig, becoming a professor in 1980.

After Detlev Lüders retired in 1982, Perels replaced him as director of the Freies Deutsches Hochstift on 1 October 1983. His time as director saw the rebuilding of the Hochstift's headquarters and the Goethe-Museum in Frankfurt. The new build included the "Arkadensaal" which is used by the Hochstift for special exhibitions, lectures and concerts. Perels also began the Hochstift's historical-critical edition of Clemens Brentano. Perels retired as director in 2003, after a twenty-year tenure. His successor was Anne Bohnenkamp-Renken.

Perels became an Honorary Professor of Goethe University Frankfurt in 1987.

== Selected works ==
- Goethe in seiner Epoche. Tübingen 1998
- Dichterwege. Stuttgart 1999
- Studien zur Aufnahme und Kritik der Rokokolyrik zwischen 1740 und 1760. Göttingen 1974 (PhD thesis)

== Sources ==
- Feilchenfeldt, Konrad; Hasenpflug, Kristina; Kurz, Gerhard; Moering, Renate, eds. (2003). Goethezeit - Zeit für Goethe. Auf den Spuren deutscher Lyriküberlieferung in die Moderne. Festschrift für Christoph Perels zum 65. Geburtstag (in German). Tübingen: Max Niemeyer. doi:10.1515/9783110949452. ISBN 3-484-10854-1.
- Degener, August Ludwig; Habel, Walter, eds. (2007). Wer ist wer? (in German). Vol. 46. Schmidt Römhild.
- "Jahresbericht 2002/3". Jahrbuch des Freien Deutschen Hochstifts (in German). Tübingen: Max Niemeyer Verlag. 2003.
