= Klappmaul Theater =

Puppet theater from Frankfurt am Main

Klappmaul Theater was a theatre group in Austria, 1975–2005.
