= Otto Heuer =

German literary historian (1854–1931)

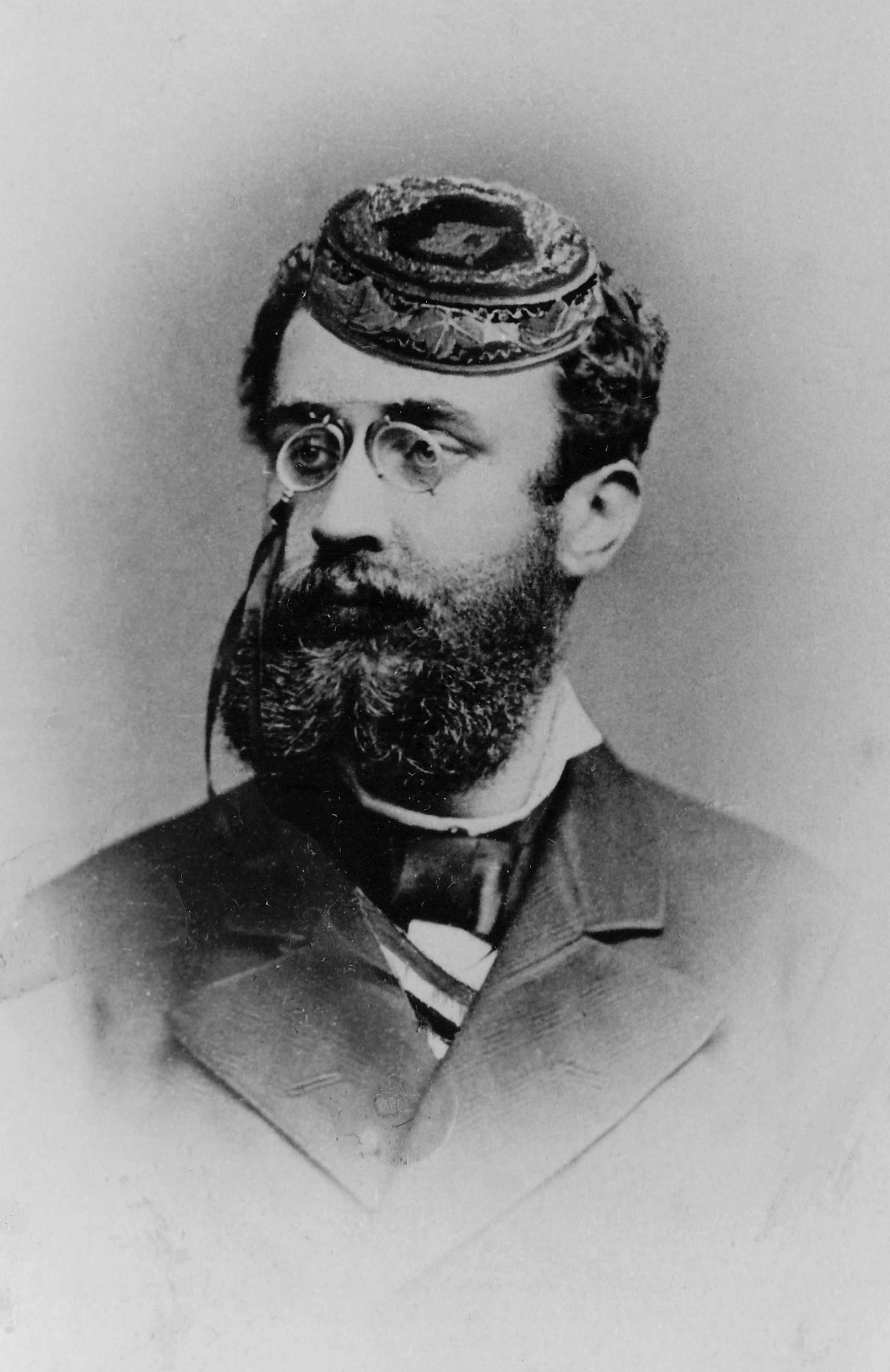
- Heuer around 1875

Director of the Freies Deutsches Hochstift
- In office 1888–1925
- Succeeded by: Ernst Beutler

Personal details
- Born: 6 February 1854
- Died: 24 January 1931 (aged 76)

Otto Heuer (6 February 1854 – 24 January 1931) was a German literary historian. He served as the director of the Freies Deutsches Hochstift literary association from 1888 until his retirement in 1925.

== Biography ==
Heuer was born on 6 February 1854 to Friedrich Wilhelm and Emilia Heuer. He attended the gymnasium in Hanover before leaving to study philology and history at Leipzig University, after which he moved to Bohemia. He later moved to Berlin in 1882 before moving to Frankfurt in 1886. On 21 January 1887, Heuer was elected secretary of the Academic Department for History in the Freies Deutsches Hochstift. In the same year Heuer received his PhD in History from Humboldt University of Berlin. On 1 April 1888, he became the librarian at the Hochstift; under Heuer this role morphed into that of director.

Heuer expanded the Hochstift's collection and curated several exhibitions about Goethe (such as one in 1892 about The Sorrows of Young Werther). He also led the construction of a new Goethe Museum in 1897, expanding the Hochstift's museum efforts. Heuer's time as director coincided with the First World War and inflation, which threatened to deplete the Hochstift's finances; he organised a fundraiser to prevent the Hochstift from collapsing. Heuer replaced the Hochstift's yearly report with a yearbook ("Jahrbuch") with academic articles about Goethe and the collection of the Hochstift.

Heuer remained as director until his retirement in 1925, upon which he was succeeded by Ernst Beutler.

After retiring, Heuer lived in Bad Homburg until his death on 24 January 1931.

== Selected works ==
- Goethe und seine Vaterstadt, Sonderabdruck aus der Festschrift zu Goethes 150. Geburtstagsfeier, dargebracht vom Freien Deutschen Hochstift, 1899.
- Goethes Geburtshaus und sein Umbau durch den Herrn Rat im Jahre 1755. Frankfurt am Main 1910.
- Die Königsleutnantsbilder im Frankfurter Goethemuseum. Zur Erinnerung an das 25-jährige Bestehen des Frankfurter Goethemuseums. Frankfurt am Main 1922.

== Sources ==
- "Bericht aus den akademichen Fachabteilung". Berichte des Freien Deutschen Hochstifts (in German). 1888. pp. 197–202.
- Beutler, Ernst (1931). "Jahresbericht". Jahrbuch des Freien Deutschen Hochstifts (in German).
- Heuer, Otto (1926). "Jahresbericht". Jahrbuch des Freien Deutschen Hochstifts (in German). pp. 237–248.
- Heuer, Otto (1887). Städtebundsbestrebungen unter König Sigmund I. Erster Teil (in German).
- Seng, Joachim (2009). Goethe-Enthusiasmus und Bürgersinn. Das freie Deutsche Hochstift - Frankfurt Goethe-Museum 1881-1960 (in German). Göttingen: Wallstein Verlag. ISBN 978-3-8353-0536-6.
