= Goethe House =

Museum in Frankfurt, Germany

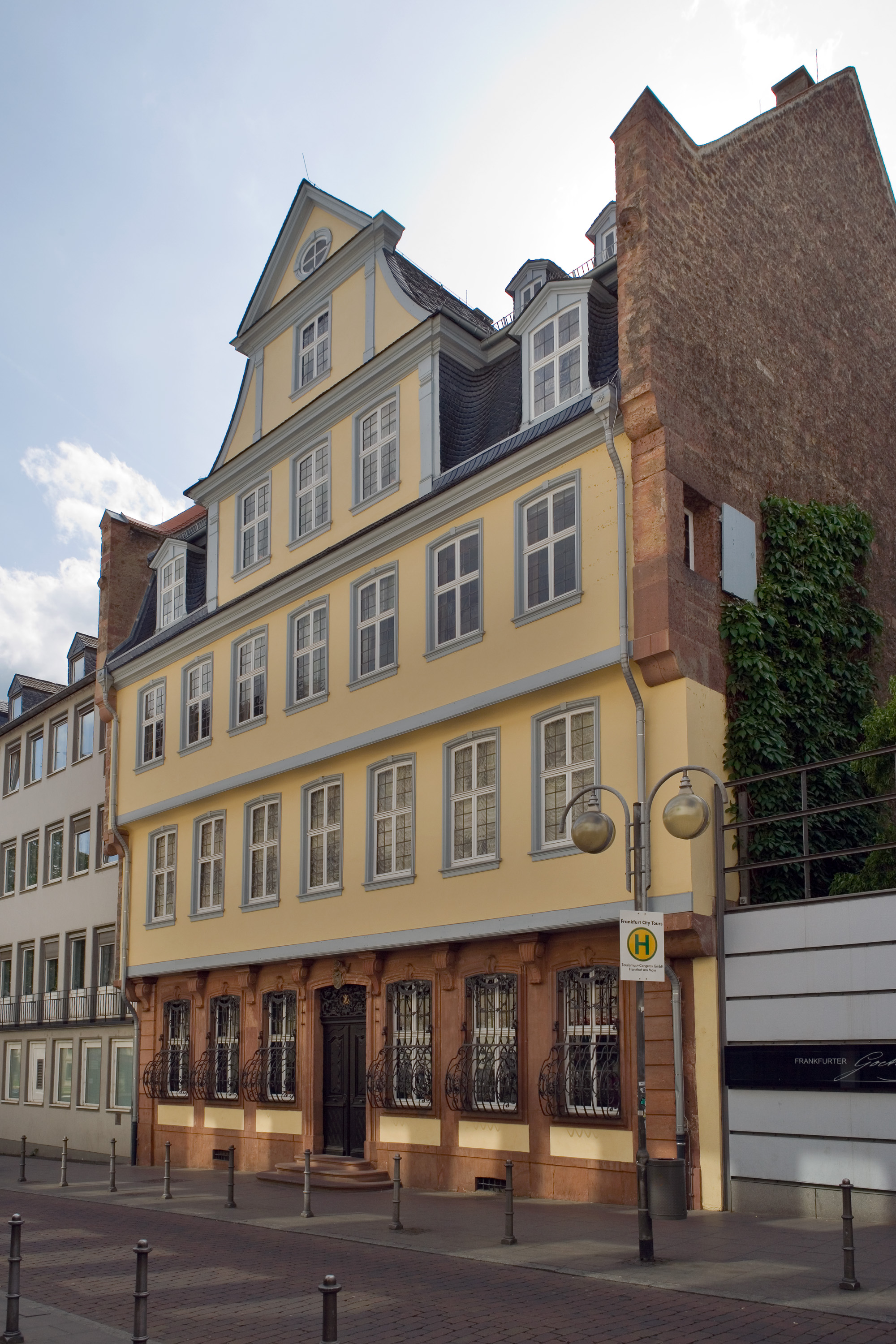
- The facade of the house in 2011
- Location: 23 Großer Hirschgraben, Altstadt, Frankfurt, Germany
- Coordinates: 50°06′40″N 8°40′39″E
- Type: Museum, cultural institution, memorial site
- Visitors: 114,849 (2018)
- Public transit access: Hauptwache; Hauptwache; Dom/Römer; 11, 12, 14 Karmeliterkloster
- Website: frankfurter-goethe-haus.de

The Goethe House is a writer's house museum located in the Innenstadt district of Frankfurt, Germany. It is the birthplace and childhood home of German poet and playwright Johann Wolfgang von Goethe. It is also the place where Goethe wrote his famous works Götz von Berlichingen, The Sorrows of Young Werther, and the first drafts of Urfaust. The house has mostly been operated as a museum since its 1863 purchase by the Freies Deutsches Hochstift (Free German Foundation), displaying period furniture and paintings from Goethe's time in the house.

The Goethe House was destroyed by Allied bombing in World War II, during a nightraid by the RAF, but reconstructed afterwards. It is located adjacent to the Deutsches Romantik-Museum, which opened in 2021. The house and museum can be visited with the same ticket.

== History ==
=== As a private residence ===
The house was first built around 1618 by Flemish goldsmith Matthis van Hinsberg. It went through a series of owners before being purchased in 1733 by Cornelia Goethe, the grandmother of Johann Wolfgang, who had previously owned an inn on the nearby Zeil. Cornelia purchased two adjoining properties and inhabited both of them; they were connected by destroying the partition wall. Johann Caspar Goethe, Cornelia's son and Johann Wolfgang's father, moved into the property in 1741, and lived there with his wife Catharina Elisabeth Goethe from 1748.

Johann Wolfgang was born in the house on 28 August 1749.

In 1754, Cornelia died, and her son quickly set about renovating the house on Großer Hirschgraben. Johann Caspar was the architect of his own project, but also sought assistance from his friend Johann Friedrich Armand von Uffenbach. The project involved knocking down the smaller of the adjoining properties and extending the remaining property to create one, large property encompassing the full lot. The renovations began in April 1755, and were finished by February 1756.

As Goethe writes in his autobiography Dichtung und Wahrheit (Poetry and Truth), his father was careful to preserve the double overhang of the facade, which was not permitted in new buildings under the codes of 1719 and 1749 due to fire risks; Johann Caspar was allowed to extend the overhanging facade as it was seen as a modification of an existing building, rather than a new-build. The resulting property remained structurally unchanged after the 1755–56 renovation.

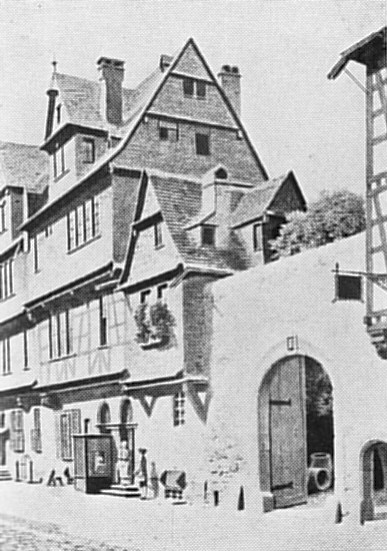
An artist's representation of the property before the 1755–56 renovation.

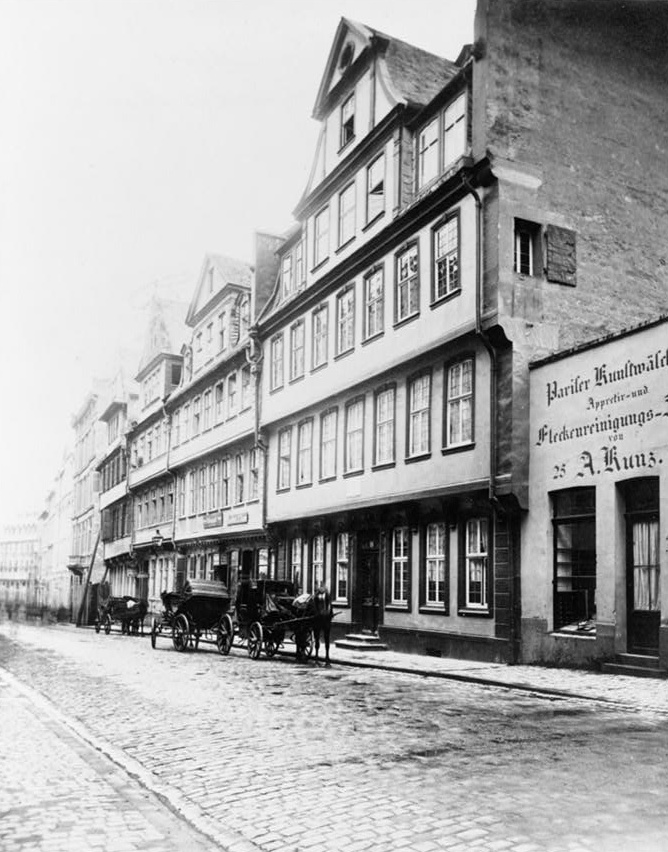
The completed house as it stood in 1850.

Johann Wolfgang first left the house in October 1765, to study law in Leipzig. He returned in 1768 due to an illness, before leaving again to finish his studies in Strasbourg (1770–71). After returning from Strasbourg, Goethe would live at the family house in Frankfurt (bar a four month stay in Wetzlar in 1772) until leaving permanently for Weimar in November 1775. During this time in Frankfurt, Goethe wrote and published Götz von Berlichingen and The Sorrows of Young Werther, which established his fame across Europe. He also wrote the first drafts of Urfaust in this period.

Johann Caspar died in 1782, after which Catharina Elisabeth was the inhabited the house alone. She rented out some rooms to other inhabitants. In May 1795, Catharina sold the house and moved into a smaller apartment.

After leaving the Goethe family, the house was sold to widow Anna Catharina Rössing, whose family owned the Goethe House until 1861. They rented out rooms to other families. In 1861, the house sold again, to Johann Georg Clauer, who split the first floor into two shops; this required significant changes, such as the installation of two new entrances and separating walls.

=== Ownership by the Freies Deutsches Hochstift ===
In 1863, the Goethe House was purchased by geologist Otto Volger, the founder and chairman of the Freies Deutsches Hochstift (Free German Foundation). The Hochstift restored the house to its state at the time of Johann Wolfgang Goethe's childhood, to serve as a memorial to the famed poet and playwright. The Goethe House also served as a centre for the Hochstift's activities; a room on the ground floor became a reading-room, and a room on the first floor became a lecture hall for public lectures. Other rooms were used to house the collections and exhibitions of the Hochstift. The house was opened to the public for the first time since in its history, and thus became the first public memorial to Goethe; the Goethe House in Weimar would not open until 1885. The house became a museum, decorated with period furniture and paintings, attempting to recreate authentically the environment in which Goethe spent his youth. After receiving a large bequest from Adolf Müller, the land to the west of the house was purchased in 1888. The Goethe Museum was built on this site. Designed by Franz von Hoven, it opened in 1897, and contained a library, as well as exhibition space for the Hochstift's collections. The restoration of the Goethe House to its 18th-century condition was completed in 1926.

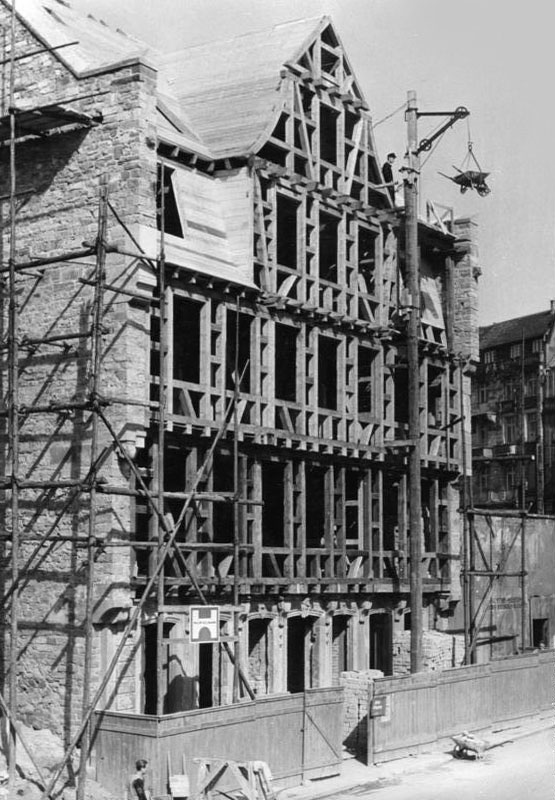
Goethe House reconstruction in May 1949

The house and museum were destroyed during the Allied bombing of Frankfurt on 22 March 1944, along with much of the Frankfurt old city.

After its destruction, there was a substantial debate as to what should become of the Goethe House. Some suggested that the site should be kept in ruins, fenced in and given a sign to signify the house's former existence. Others saw the rebuilding as unnecessary, at least directly after the war, as many were still living in unsatisfactory conditions. The Freies Deutsches Hochstift, on the other hand, wanted the house to be rebuilt exactly as it stood; this was the plan accepted by the Frankfurt municipality, and thus the reconstruction began in 1947. The reconstruction was led by architect Theo Kellner. The process was aided by the fact that there were many surviving plans and pictures of the house. In 1951, the Goethe House was re-opened to the public by Theodor Heuss, then President of Germany.

When the adjacent Deutsches Romantik-Museum was opened in 2021, the Goethe House became accessible through it, using the same ticket.

== Architecture ==
=== Facade ===
The house's current facade dates back to the reconstruction of the Goethe House after the Second World War. However, it mimics closely that of the original house.

The original facade came about as a result of Johann Caspar Goethe's renovations of 1755–56, in which he demolished one of the two adjoining properties and extended the other over the created space. He did this in order to keep the overhang of the house, which is a prominent feature of the facade.

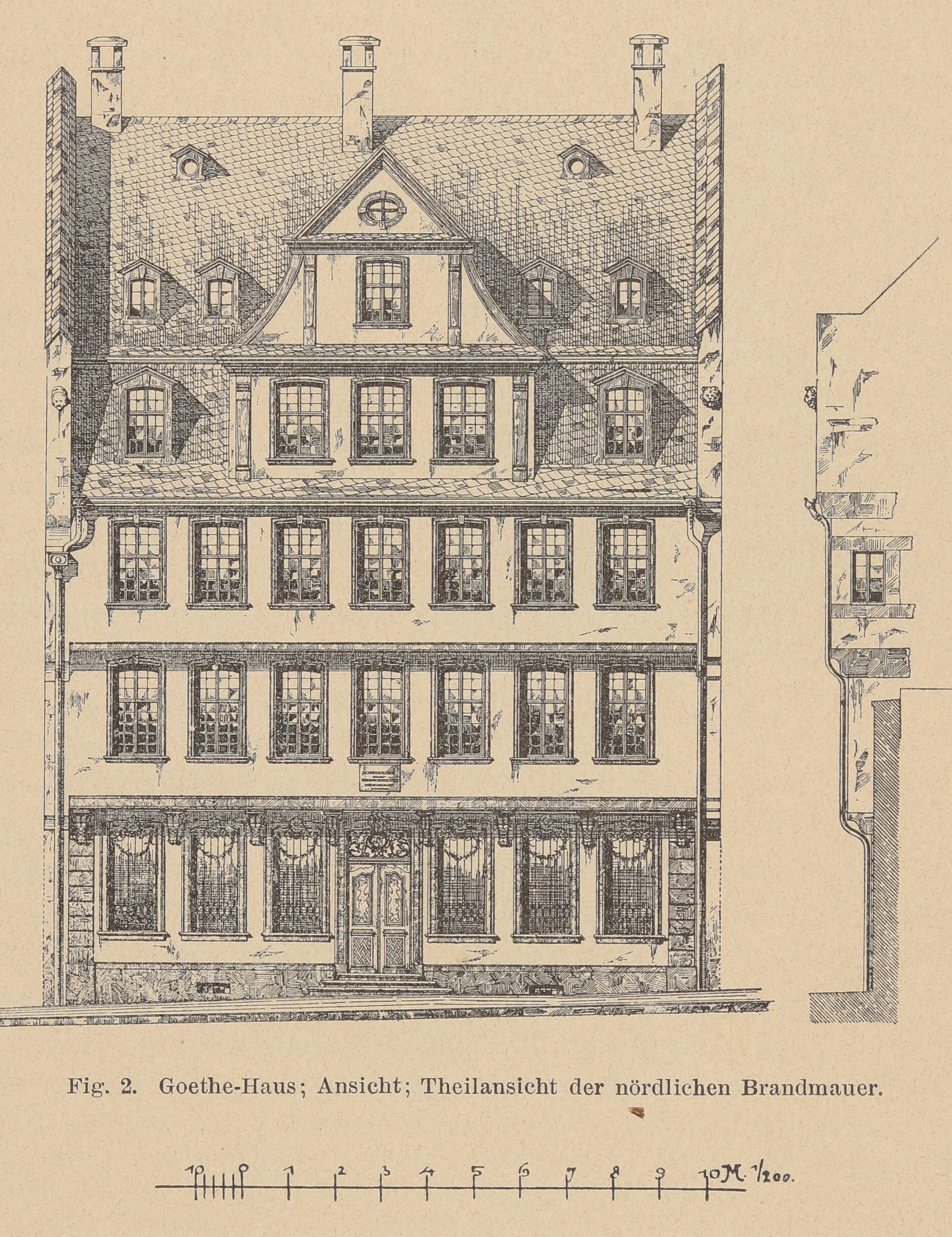
A plan of the house's facade from 1902

The facade was typical of affluent Frankfurt houses of the time; Rudolf Jung notes that the house's facade "differed little from its neighbours". The facade was inspired by Parisian architecture of the time of the Régence, and is a mixture of the Baroque and Rococo styles. Another building of a similar style in Frankfurt was the Palais Thurn und Taxis, built between 1731 and 1739.

The ground floor is the most elaborately designed part of the facade. Six window frames are fitted with wrought-iron architraves, which are decorated with garlands. The window bays are framed by ashlar pilasters. There are three steps leading up to the doorway in the centre of the facade. Above the door is a transom window decorated with an iron mesh, in which can be seen the initials of Johann Caspar Goethe (JCG). The coat of arms of Johann Caspar can be found in the archway above the door; he adapted the arms from those of his wife's family, the Textors, which feature an arm swinging an axe and a youth holding a sword. Johann Caspar then added three lyres to the design. The lyre is the attribute of the god Apollo, the god of music and the arts; the fine arts were to have a home in the Goethe House.

The first and second floors of the facade are more simple, consisting of seven bays with windows, which have painted wooden sills but little decoration. Above this is the mansard roof, out of which protrude four dormer windows, two on each side. In the centre of the roof protrudes a large dormer structure, supported by vertical wooden pillars, which rises three floors above the main house. The top level of this structure is gabled, and contains a small circular skylight.

The facade of the Goethe House is constructed of wood and underpinned with bricks, with wooden pillars, window frames and cornices. The house is covered with yellow plaster, and the pillars, frames and cornices covered with grey plaster.

=== Interior ===
The house consists of four levels of rooms, as well as an attic and a basement, for a total of 18 rooms. The former kitchen and dining rooms are located on the ground floor, as was Cornelia Goethe's living space. On the second floor there is a "Gartenzimmer" ("Garden Room"), so named because of the view it formerly offered of a neighbouring garden; the Goethe House possesses no garden, but rather a small courtyard, a fact which Goethe bemoaned in his Dichtung und Wahrheit. The bedroom of Johann Caspar and Catharina Elisabeth was also on the second floor. In the upper floors there is a landing which branches off into the separate rooms, with a checkered red and white floor. The house was previously heated by ovens, which are located in these landing spaces. The ground floor contains a typical piece of furniture of the time, a "Brandschrank" cabinet to store important documents and valuables that could quickly be carried out, in case of fire.

==== Staircase ====
The Goethe House features an extravagant staircase and railing, which was constructed by the stonemason Joseph Therbu. It was unusually elaborate for its time; the only other example of such an ornate staircase was found in the Römer. Johann Caspar intended the staircase to be one of the main features of the house, hence the heavy decoration. The stairs on the ground floor are made of stone, a feature left over from before Johann Caspar's renovation. The railing is of wrought-iron, decorated with flowers and other designs in the Baroque style. After the first floor, the staircase is made of wood, but the iron railing continues. At the second floor, the railing is decorated with the initials of Johann Caspar (JCG) and Catharina Elisabeth (CEG).The staircase becomes far less elaborate between the third and fourth floor, with only simple wooden railings. Unlike most of the architectural features of the house, the railing of the staircase is original; it was removed from the rubble of the bombed house and restored.

== Museumsufer ==
Goethe House is part of the Museumsufer.

Museumsufer Frankfurt
Museums of the Museumsufer, Frankfurt am Main
South Bank
1 Hindemith Kabinett im Kuhhirtenturm (de)
2 Icon Museum (de) (Museum of Orthodox sacred Art)
3 Portikus (Exhibition hall for contemporary art)
4 Museum Angewandte Kunst (Applied Arts)
5 Museum der Weltkulturen (Ethnological Museum)
6 Deutsches Filmmuseum (de) (German Film Museum)
7 Deutsches Architekturmuseum
8 Museum für Kommunikation
9 Städel (Fine Arts Museum)
10 Liebieghaus (Classical sculpture collection)
11 Museum Giersch (Art and culture of Rhine-Main)
North Bank
12 Jewish Museum Frankfurt
13 Frankfurt Archaeological Museum (de)
14 Historical Museum, Frankfurt
15 Caricatura Museum Frankfurt
16 Schirn Kunsthalle Frankfurt (Art exhibition venue)
17 Museum für Moderne Kunst (Modern Art Museum)
18 Frankfurter Judengasse Museum (Preserved foundations from the Ghetto)
19 Deutsches Romantik-Museum / Goethe House
External
20 Naturmuseum Senckenberg (Westend, Frankfurt)
21 Eintracht Frankfurt Museum (Waldstadion)
22 German Leather Museum (Offenbach)
23 Klingspor Museum (Offenbach)

== See also ==
- Museumsufer

== Sources ==
- Adler, Fritz (1959). Das Freie Deutsche Hochstift. Seine Geschichte 1859–1885 (in German). Frankfurt.
- Bauer, Werner M. (1978). Deutsches Literatur-Lexikon. Sechster Band: Gaa – Gysin (in German) (3rd ed.). Bern: Francke Verlag. ISBN 3-7720-1283-3.
- von Gersdorff, Dagmar (2015). Goethes Mutter (in German) (5th ed.). Frankfurt: Insel Verlag. ISBN 978-3-458-34625-8.
- Goethe, Johann Wolfgang von (1982). Dichtung und Wahrheit (in German). Frankfurt am Main: Insel. OCLC 8779749.
- Götting, Franz (1949). Chronik von Goethes Leben (in German). Darmstadt: Insel Verlag.
- Hodgson, Petra Hagen (1997). "Wandlung, Verwandlungen. Zur Architektur-Geschichte der Frankfurter Goethe-Stätten". Gegenwärtige Vergangenheit : das Freie Deutsche Hochstift 100 Jahre nach Gründung des Frankfurter Goethe-Museums (in German). Frankfurt: Freies Deutsches Hochstift. pp. 52–78. OCLC 313916370.
- Jung, Rudolf (1902). Das Goethe-Haus in Frankfurt am Main (in German). Frankfurt.
- Lübbecke, Fried (1946). Frankfurt am Main. Goethes Heimat (in German). Frankfurt: Verlag Dr. Waldemar Kramer.
- Maisak, Petra; Dewitz, Hans-Georg (2018). Das Goethe-Haus in Frankfurt am Main (in German) (6th ed.). Frankfurt: Insel Verlag. ISBN 978-3-458-33925-0.
- Perels, Christoph (1994). "Das Frankfurter Goethe-Museum. Vom Gedenkzimmer zur Galerei der Goethezeit". Das Frankfurter Goethe-Museum zu Gast im Städel (in German). Mainz: Verlag Hermann Schmidt. pp. 8–17. ISBN 3-87439-311-9.
- Pielmann, Erika (1999). "Goethes Treppenhäuser". Goethe-Jahrbuch 1998 (in German). Weimar: Verlag Hermann Böhlaus Nachfolger Weimar. pp. 171–181. ISBN 3-7400-1035-5.
- Sternberger, Dolf (April 1947). "Tagebuch, Das Frankfurter Goethehaus". Die Wandlung (in German) (3): 191–201.
- Stumm, Alexander (2017). Architektonische Konzepte der Rekonstruktion (in German). Birkhäuser. ISBN 978-3-0356-1349-0.
