= Anne Bohnenkamp-Renken =

German academic

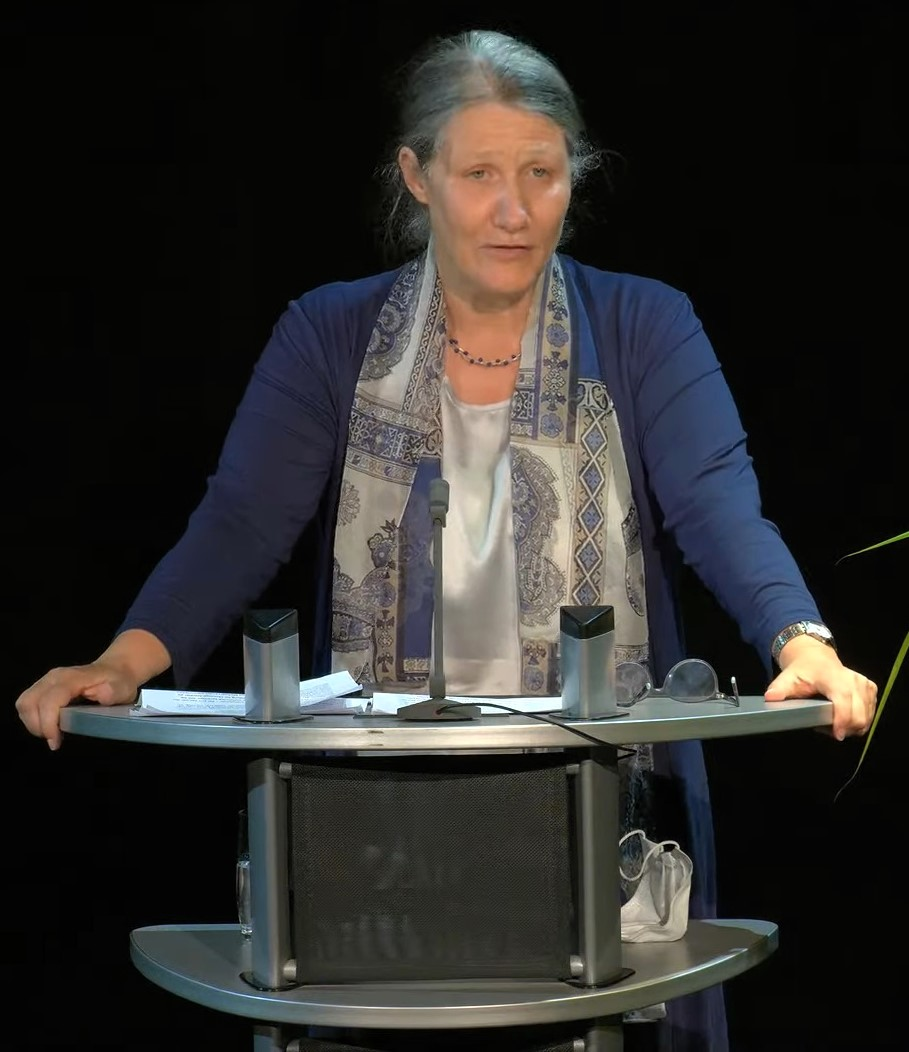
Bohnenkamp-Renken speaks at the opening of the German Romantic Museums in 2021

Anne Bohnenkamp-Renken (born 17 November 1960) is a German academic who has served as the director of the Freies Deutsches Hochstift since 2003. She received the 2022 Hessian Cultural Prize for both her direction of the Hochstift and her personal academic work. In 2025, she received the Goethe Plaque of the City of Frankfurt.

== Life ==
Bohnenkamp-Renken was born in Hilden. Bohnenkamp-Renken's father was a physicist and mathematician who worked at a Max Planck Institute, and her mother was an infant nurse. Her grandfather was Hans Bohnenkamp, a professor who influenced Helmut Schmidt.

Bohnenkamp-Renken studied German literature, philosophy, and journalism at the universities of Göttingen and Florence between 1980 and 1987. In 1992, she received her PhD from Göttingen with a dissertation about Goethe's Faust. Bohnenkamp-Renken habilitated in 2000, and she became the director of the Freies Deutsches Hochstift in June 2003.

As director, Bohnenkamp-Renken has led the Hochstift's work on a historical critical edition of Clemens Brentano. She directed the historical-critical edition of Goethe's Faust which the Hochstift created between 2009 and 2015 in conjunction with the Klassik Stiftung Weimar.

Bohnenkamp-Renken was an honorary professor of Goethe University Frankfurt from 2004 to 2012, when she became a full professor, teaching modern German literature.

Bohnenkamp-Renken is married and has two adult children.

== Memberships ==
- 2004 Göttingen Academy of Sciences and Humanities
- 2014 Akademie der Wissenschaften und der Literatur Mainz
- 2016 Deutsche Akademie für Sprache und Dichtung

== Selected works ==
- Bohnenkamp-Renken, Anne (2013). Medienwandel/Medienwechsel in der Editionswissenschaft (in German). Berlin/Boston. ISBN 978-3-11-030043-7. OCLC 824668736.
- Bohnenkamp, Anne; Richter, Elke (2013). Brief-Edition im digitalen Zeitalter (in German). Berlin/Boston. ISBN 978-3-11-028935-0. OCLC 865141152.
- Bohnenkamp, Anne; Möbus, Frank; Lüthje, Ulla (2012). Mit Gunst und Verlaub! wandernde Handwerker: Tradition und Alternative (in German). Göttingen. ISBN 978-3-8353-1190-9. OCLC 835295808.
- Bohnenkamp, Anne (2010). Konjektur und Krux zur Methodenpolitik der Philologie (in German). Göttingen. ISBN 978-3-8353-0604-2. OCLC 649519351.
- Bohnenkamp-Renken, Anne (1994). " ... das Hauptgeschäft nicht außer Augen lassend" : die Paralipomena zu Goethes Faust (in German). Frankfurt am Main u.a.: Insel-Verl. ISBN 3-458-16643-2. OCLC 243794346.
