= Ernst Beutler =

German Goethe researcher (1885–1960)

Director of the Freies Deutsches Hochstift
- In office 1925–1960
- Preceded by: Otto Heuer
- Succeeded by: Detlev Lüders

Personal details
- Born: 12 April 1885
- Died: 8 November 1960 (aged 75) Frankfurt, Hesse, Germany
- Awards: Goethe Prize (1960)

Ernst Beutler (12 April 1885 — 8 November 1960) was a German literary historian and Goethe researcher who served as the director of the Freies Deutsches Hochstift literary society between 1925 and 1960.

== Biography ==
Ernst Beutler was born in Reichenbach im Vogtland, a town in Saxony, to Karl Hugo and Anna Beutler. Beutler's father was a merchant. Beutler attended the Friedrichsgymnasium in Altenberg, Saxony before studying classical philology, German and history at the universities of Leipzig and Tübingen from 1904 to 1911. After graduating, Beutler moved to Hamburg where he worked at the State and University Library, in the manuscript department. He married Hildegard Cordes (1895–1971) on 22 July 1918.

Beutler received his PhD at Hamburg in February 1925 with a dissertation about early humanistic comedy.

In 1925, after 13 years working at the library, Beutler was appointed director of the Freies Deutsches Hochstift, succeeding Otto Heuer. Beutler began teaching at the Goethe University in Frankfurt in 1927 At the Hochstift, Beutler introduced new publication series and reformed the program of events. Philosophers such as Karl Jaspers and Martin Heidegger, and writers such as Else Lasker-Schüler and Robert Musil were invited by Beutler to talk at the Hochstift. Beutler also introduced a fundraising campaign, spear-headed by Paul von Hindenburg, to fund a new museum, which was opened in 1932.

The Nazis sought to remove Beutler from his position as director due to his liberal leanings, and because his wife was half-Jewish. He was removed as professor at Goethe University in 1937. Between 1939 and 1943, Beutler had the collections of the Hochstift moved into 12 different locations in the area surrounding Frankfurt, to avoid their destruction during the war.

The Goethe House and museum were destroyed during the air raids on Frankfurt am Main in 1944. After the conclusion of the Second World War, there was much debate over what should become of the house. Some thought it should be kept in ruins, with others seeing rebuilding unnecessary when people were still living in unsatisfactory conditions. Ernst Beutler, however, pushed for the house to be fully rebuilt as it had stood; he was aided by the fact that all the house's furnishings had survived. Beutler's plan was accepted by the Frankfurt municipality, and reconstruction began in 1947.

Between 1948 and 1960, Beutler published the Goethe "Commemorative Edition" with Artemis-Verlag. In the 1950s, he sought to expand the manuscripts collection of the Freies Deutsches Hochstift by purchasing manuscripts by Clemens Brentano and Novalis.

Beuter was one of the four founders of the Goethe Prize, a prize awarded by the city of Frankfurt.

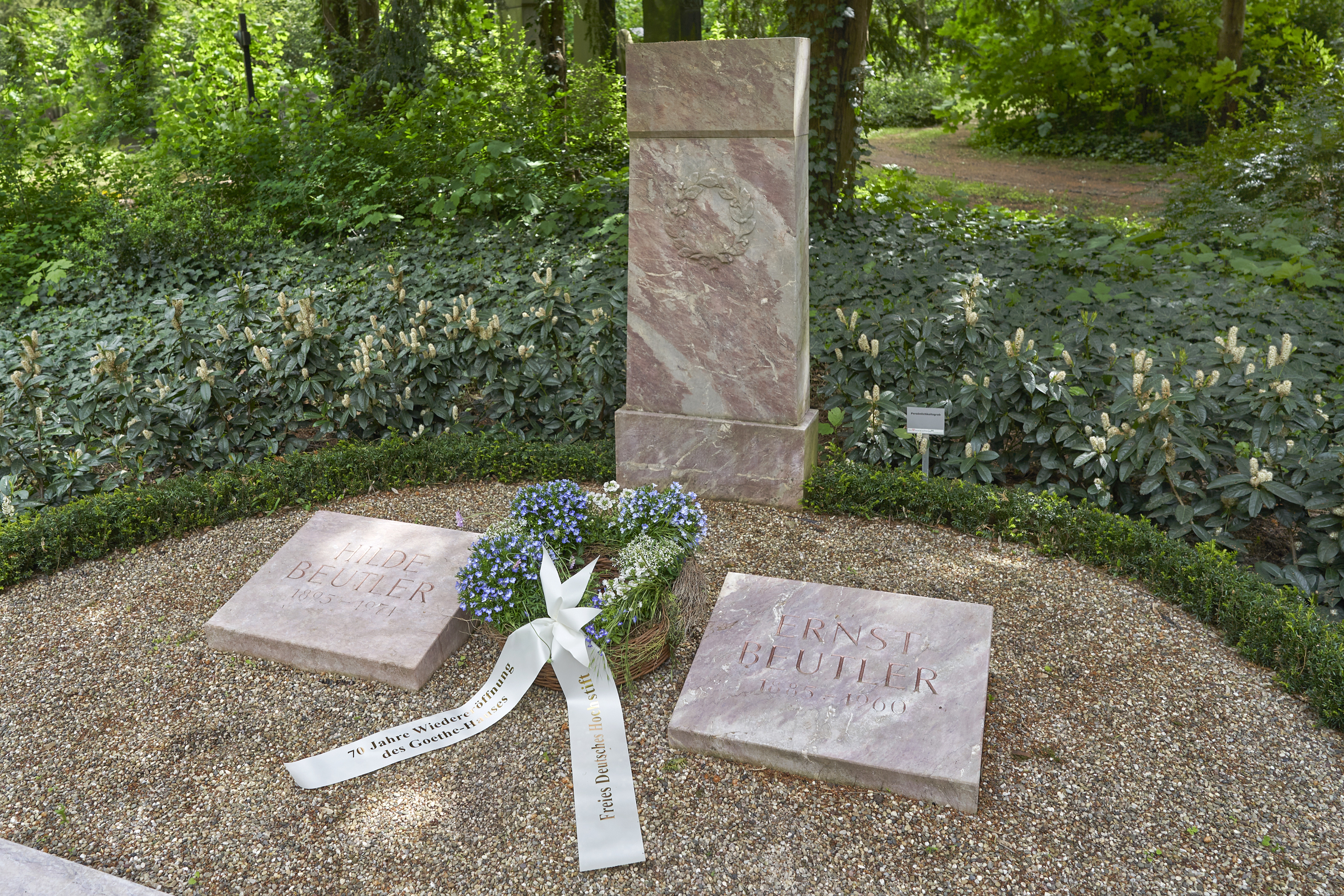
Beutler's grave at Frankfurt Main Cemetery

In 1946, Beutler became an honorary professor at the University of Frankfurt. He published numerous works, such as his 24-volume Goethe-edition between 1948 and 1954. Beutler received the Goethe Prize in 1960 for his contributions to the "Goethean spirit" and his efforts towards the rebuilding of the Goethe House. Beutler was the only literary scholar to receive the Goethe Prize. He died on 8 November in the same year, aged 75. Beutler is buried at Frankfurt Main Cemetery.

== Selected works ==
- Goethe, Faust und Urfaust. Erläutert von Ernst Beutler. Leipzig 1939
- Essays um Goethe. Frankfurt am Main 1941
- Der König in Thule und die Dichtungen von der Lorelay. Ein Essay. Zürich 1947
- Wiederholte Spiegelungen. Drei Essays über Goethe. Göttingen 1957

== Sources ==
- Perels, Christoph (1985). Ersnt Beutler (in German). Frankfurt am Main: Freies Deutsches Hochstift.
- Emrich, Willi (1963). Die Träger des Goethepreises der Stadt Frankfurt am Main von 1927 bis 1961 (in German). Frankfurt: Verlag August Osterrieth.
- Heuer, Otto (1926). "Jahresbericht". Jahrbuch des Freien Deutschen Hochstifts (in German). pp. 237–248.
- Müller, Angelika (1985). "Ernst Beutlers Lebenschronik". Ernst Beutler (in German). pp. 113–121.
- Seng, Joachim (2009). Goethe-Enthusiasmus und Bürgersinn. Das freie Deutsche Hochstift - Frankfurt Goethe-Museum 1881-1960 (in German). Göttingen: Wallstein Verlag. ISBN 978-3-8353-0536-6.
- Sternberger, Dolf (April 1947). "Tagebuch, Das Frankfurter Goethehaus". Die Wandlung (in German) (3): 191–201.
