= Freies Deutsches Hochstift =

German literary society

- Logo as of August 2022
- Formation: 10 November 1859; 166 years ago
- Founder: Otto Volger
- Purpose: Supervision of the Frankfurt Goethe House and Deutsches Romantik-Museum
- Location: 23–25 Großer Hirschgraben, Frankfurt am Main, Hesse, Germany
- Director: Anne Bohnenkamp-Renken
- Website: freies-deutsches-hochstift.de

The Freies Deutsches Hochstift (Free German Foundation) is a literary association based in Frankfurt, Hesse, Germany. It is the owner of the Goethe House, the place where the playwright and poet Johann Wolfgang von Goethe was born and spent his early years, which it operates as a museum. The Hochstift also manages the Deutsches Romantik-Museum, a museum dedicated to German Romanticism which opened in 2021.

The Hochstift produces critical editions of literary works such as Goethe's Faust, and holds lectures, exhibitions and concerts. The Freies Deutsches Hochstift possesses an extensive collection of books, manuscripts, letters and paintings from the period known as the Goethezeit (1770–1830).

== History ==
=== Founding and leadership by Otto Volger ===
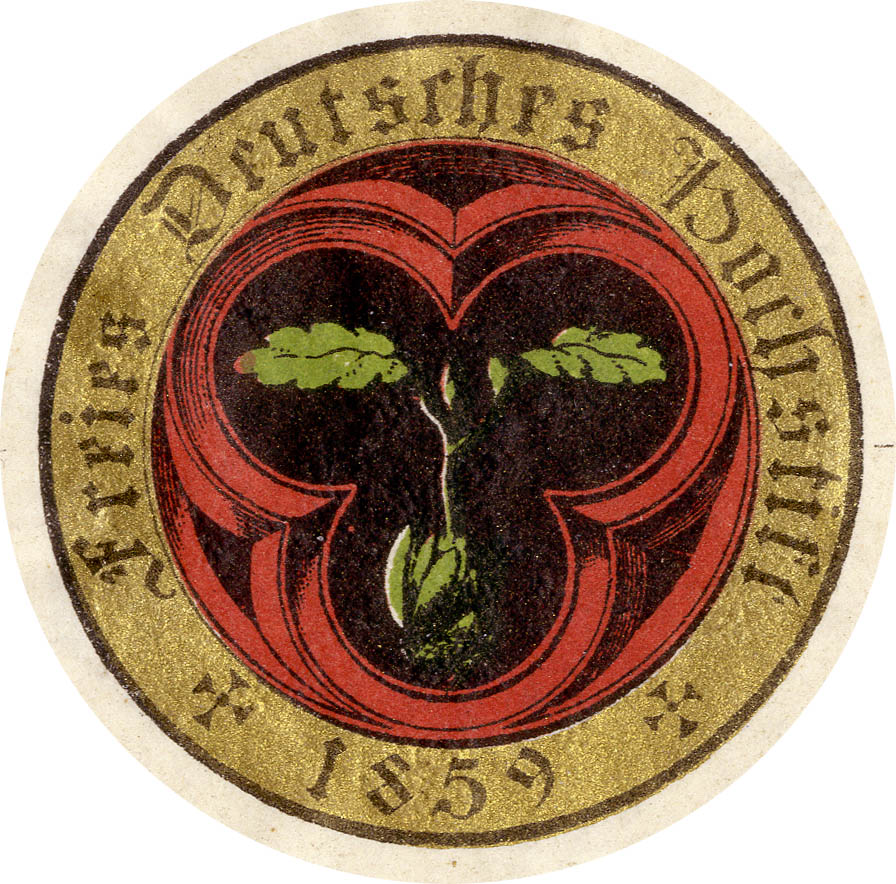
1859 seal with the black, red and gold colours of the Frankfurt Parliament

The Freies Deutsches Hochstift für Wissenschaften, Künste und allgemeine Bildung (Free German Foundation for Science, Arts and General Education) was founded on 10 November 1859, the 100th birthday of Friedrich Schiller, by 56 people, most of whom were citizens of Frankfurt. The initiator was Otto Volger, a lecturer of geology at the Senckenberg Nature Research Society from Lüneburg, who was involved in the 1848 revolution. Volger founded the Hochstift to be a ""Bundestag" of the German spirit", a place where those who held the pan-German ideas of the 1848 revolution were to find a spiritual and cultural home. This sentiment was reflected in the original seal of the association, which featured the black, red and gold colours of the Frankfurt Parliament. The early members of the Hochstift included Ludwig Büchner (brother of the playwright Georg Büchner) and the chemist Karl Friedrich Mohr.

The original purpose of the Freies Deutsches Hochstift was to provide a general education for the public. It achieved this purpose through holding lectures on various topics, such as geology or philosophy, and by providing a library for use by its members. The Hochstift also offered longer "courses" for members, for courses in economics or art, and courses providing an overview of German literature. In this regard, the Hochstift provided a similar education to that of a university. Although the Hochstift is today solely a literary organisation, much of its educational activities in its early years revolved around the sciences.

In 1863, Volger purchased the Goethe House, the birthplace of the poet Johann Wolfgang von Goethe, for the Hochstift. The house was opened in 1864 as the first public memorial site to Goethe. After the purchase of the Goethe House, the Hochstift's priorities shifted, and it began to collect books, manuscripts and art of the "Goethezeit" (1770–1830). The Hochstift's lectures began to focus more on literature over science or other topics.

Volger began to fall out of favour with the Hochstift in the late 1870s; he sought to maintain the Hochstift's focus on ordinary people's education, whereas others wanted the Hochstift to be a more prestigious learned organisation. After the Hochstift received a bequest of more than 500,000 Marks from a Dr. Adolf Müller in 1881, Volger's opponents sought to remove him from his position as Obmann (chairman) of the Hochstift, which they achieved in November 1881, when Volger was voted out in favour of Karl Nikolaus Berg, a lawyer and politician who had served in the Frankfurt government. After continuing to attack members of the Hochstift administration in open letters, Volger was eventually expelled in 1882. Berg would serve as Obmann of the Hochstift until his retirement in November 1885.

=== Leadership by Otto Heuer and Ernst Beutler ===
After the removal of Volger, the teaching activities of the Hochstift expanded. An "Academic Committee" was established, which offered lectures in seven departments. In 1887, the Hochstift organised the "Second New-Philology Conference", in which the famous school reformer Karl Reinhardt presented his ideas for a new school system. In 1890, the Hochstift helped start the "Frankfurter Volksvorlesungen" (Frankfurt People's Lectures). The Hochstift held a "social congress" in Frankfurt in 1893, in which the social reformer and politician Karl Flesch discussed worker's rights and unemployment.

Otto Heuer led the Freies Deutsches Hochstift as director between 1888 and 1925. Under Heuer the Hochstift began holding exhibitions. He extended the collections greatly, and oversaw the construction of a new library and museum building for the Hochstift, which opened in 1897. When the Goethe University Frankfurt was founded in 1914, it took over most of the Hochstift's adult education activities, leading the association to focus more on its museum and collection-related endeavours.

In 1925, Ernst Beutler was elected as director. By this point, inflation had wittled away the endowment of the Hochstift. Beutler secured funding from the state, city and national government for the continued upkeep of the Goethe House. He began a fundraising campaign, which was spearheaded by Paul von Hindenburg, the then President of Germany. This campaign helped stabilised the Hochstift's finances and allowed the construction of an expanded Goethe museum, which was inaugurated by the author Thomas Mann in 1932.

An appeal from Beutler to the Freies Deutsches Hochstift's members after the destruction of the Goethe House on 22 March 1944

The Freies Deutsches Hochstift was seen in a negative light by the Nazi Party, which suspended state funding for the organisation. This was in part due to the Hochstift allowing disfavoured, liberal scholars such as Karl Jaspers and Ludwig Curtius to give lectures, and partly due to Ernst Beutler's own liberal leanings. The Nazis designated Beutler's wife as a "Mischling", which was used in his attempted removal. Between 1939 and 1943, Beutler had the collections of the Hochstift moved into 12 different locations in the area surrounding Frankfurt, to avoid their destruction during the war.

=== Modern history ===
The Goethe House and museum were destroyed during the air raids on Frankfurt am Main in 1944. After the conclusion of the Second World War, there was much debate over what should become of the house. Some thought it should be kept in ruins, with others seeing rebuilding unnecessary when people were still living in unsatisfactory conditions. Ernst Beutler and the Hochstift, however, wanted the house to be rebuilt exactly as it had stood. This plan was aided by the fact that the previous interior and contents were removed in good time and were retained. Beutler's plan was accepted by the Frankfurt municipality, and reconstruction began in 1947. Reconstruction was led by the painter and architect Theo Kellner. In 1951, the Goethe House was re-opened to the public by Theodor Heuss, then President of Germany.

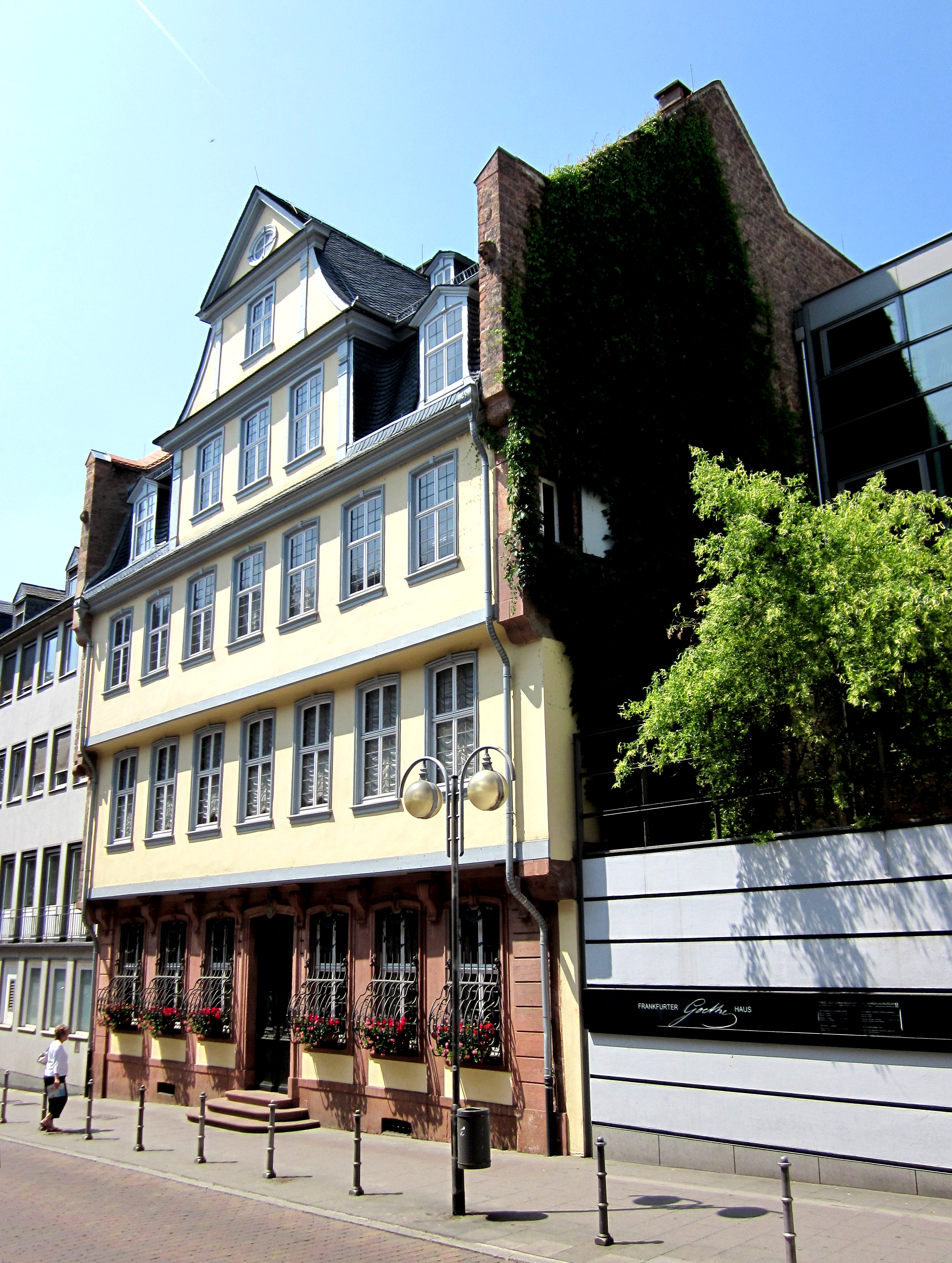
Goethe House in Frankfurt in 2011

Beutler was succeeded by Detlev Lüders, who served as director between 1963 and 1982. Under Lüders, the Hochstift's research and editing activities began; the Hochstift began producing the historical-critical editions of Clemens Brentano and Hugo von Hoffmannsthal. In 1973, the Hochstift opened a museum in Rome dedicated to Goethe's Italian Journey. It remained under the control of the Hochstift until its closure in 1982. In 1997 the museum was reopened as Casa di Goethe, but is no longer under the Hochstift's control.

In 1997, the Hochstift and Goethe Museum buildings were renovated and the "Arkadensaal", a large room for special exhibitions, lectures and concerts, was built.

Anne Bohnenkamp-Renken became director in 2003, becoming the first woman to hold the position. She has since overseen the publication of a historical-critical edition of Goethe's Faust, as well as the building of the Deutsches Romantik-Museum, a museum dedicated to German Romanticism which opened in 2021.

== Publications ==
Since 1860, the Hochstift has published a yearly report. Since 1902, this has been published as the Jahrbuch des Freien Deutschen Hochstifts. It contains scholarly articles as well as reports about the collections of the Hochstift. The Jahrbuch is published by Wallstein Verlag.

The Hochstift has published several critical editions of different authors. The critical edition of Hugo von Hofmannsthal, of which the first volume was published in 1975, was completed in 2022. The critical edition of Clemens Brentano remains unfinished, and has run over 40 volumes as of August 2022. The critical edition of Goethe's Faust was created between 2009 and 2015 as a collaboration between the Freies Deutsches Hochstift and the Klassik Stiftung Weimar. It was accompanied by a free digital version.

== Directors ==
- Otto Volger, Obmann 1859–1881
- Karl Nikolaus Berg, Obmann 1881–1885
- Otto Heuer, 1888–1925
- Ernst Beutler, 1925–1960
- Detlev Lüders, 1963–1982
- Christoph Perels, 1983–2003
- Anne Bohnenkamp-Renken, 2003–present

== Sources ==
- Adler, Fritz (1959). Freies Deutsches Hochstift. Seine Geschichte 1859–1885 (in German).
- Einaudi, Roberto; Zeli, Fabiana (1997). Umbau und Restaurierung der Casa di Goethe. "Endlich in dieser Haupstadt der welt angelangt!" Goethe im Rom: Band 1: Essays (in German). Verlag Philipp von Zabern.
- Hendrix, Harald (2012). Writers' Houses and the Making of Memory. Taylor & Francis. ISBN 978-1-135-90805-8.
- Hodgson, Petra Hagen (1997). "Wandlung, Verwandlungen. Zur Arkitektur-Geschichte der Frankfurter Goethe-Stätten". Gegenwärtige Vergangenheit das Freie Deutsche Hochstift hundert Jahre nach der Gründung des Frankfurter Goethe-Museums (in German). Frankfurt: Freies Deutsches Hochstift. pp. 52–78.
- Kretschmann, Carsten (2009). Räume öffnen sich Naturhistorische Museen im Deutschland des 19. Jahrhunderts (in German). De Gruyter. ISBN 978-3-05-004782-9.
- Lerner, Franz (1960). "Die ersten Mitglieder des Freien Deutschen Hochstifts". Archiv für Frankfurts Geschichte und Kunst. 47: 63–74.
- Lüders, Detlev (1975). "Das Goethe-Museum des Freien Deutschen Hochstifts in Rom. Bericht über seine Gründung am 29. Oktober 1973". Jahrbuch des Freien Deutschen Hochstifts (in German). Tübingen: Max Niemeyer Verlag. pp. 377–393.
- Perels, Christoph (1994). Das Frankfurter Goethe-Museum zu Gast im Städel (in German). Mainz: Verlag Hermann Schmidt. pp. 8–17. ISBN 3-87439-311-9.
- Sakurai, Ayako (2013). Science and Societies in Frankfurt am Main. Pickering and Chatto. ISBN 978-1-84893-397-2.
- Seng, Joachim (2009). Goethe-Enthusiasmus und Bürgersinn. Das freie Deutsche Hochstift - Frankfurt Goethe-Museum 1881-1960 (in German). Göttingen: Wallstein Verlag. ISBN 978-3-8353-0536-6.
- Sternberger, Dolf (April 1947). "Tagebuch. Das Frankfurter Goethehaus". Die Wandlung (in German). 3: 191–201.
- Stumm, Alexander (2017). Architektonische Konzepte der Rekonstruktion (in German). Birkhäuser. ISBN 978-3-0356-1349-0.
- von Trawny, Peter (2000). "Voll Verdienst, doch dichterisch wohnet der Mensch auf dieser Erde" Heidegger und Hölderlin. Martin-Heidegger-Gesellschaft. p. 229.
