= Braunschweig =

City and urban agglomeration in Lower Saxony, Germany

Brunswick Braunschweig (German) Bronswiek (Low German)
- City
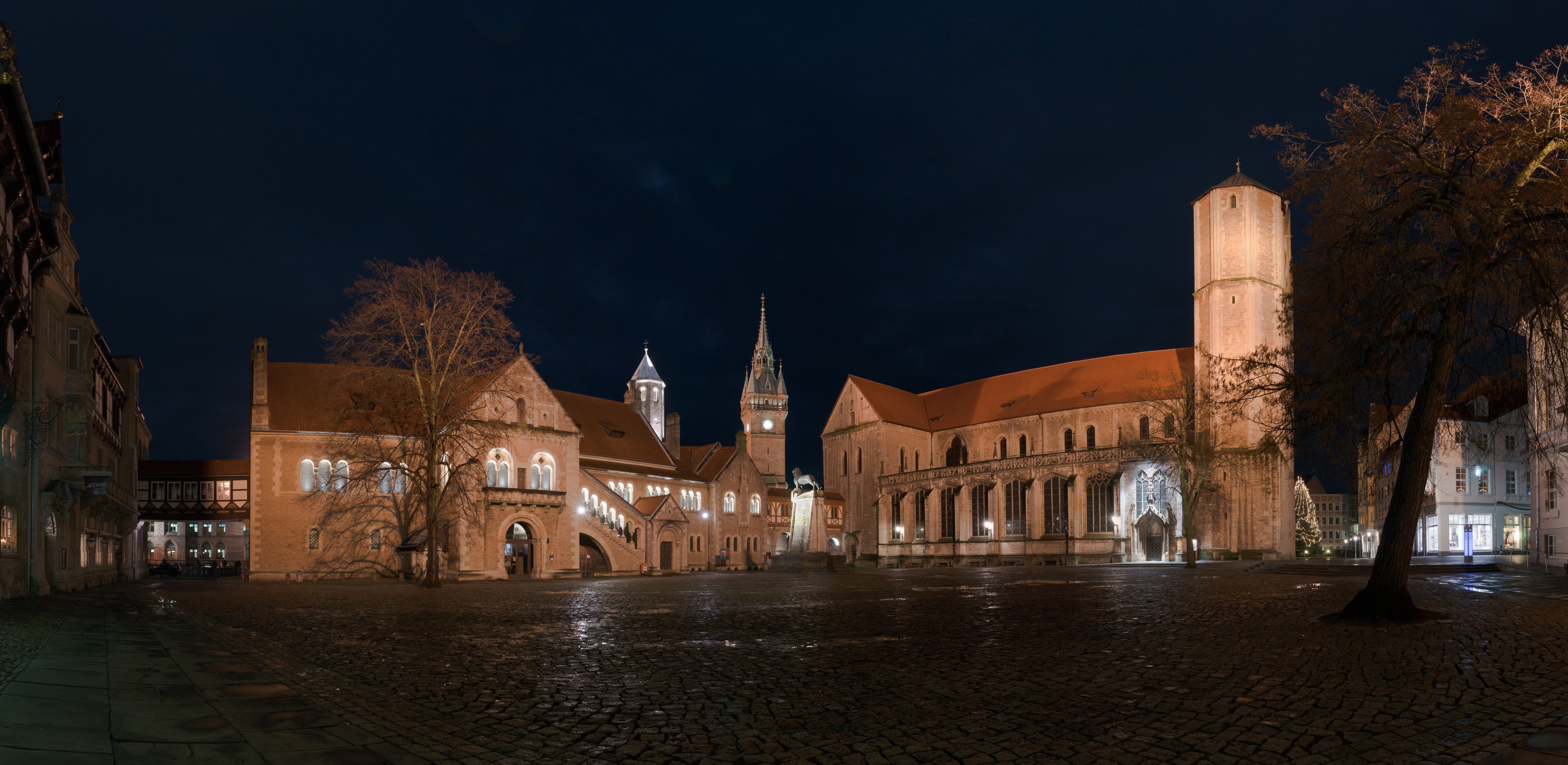
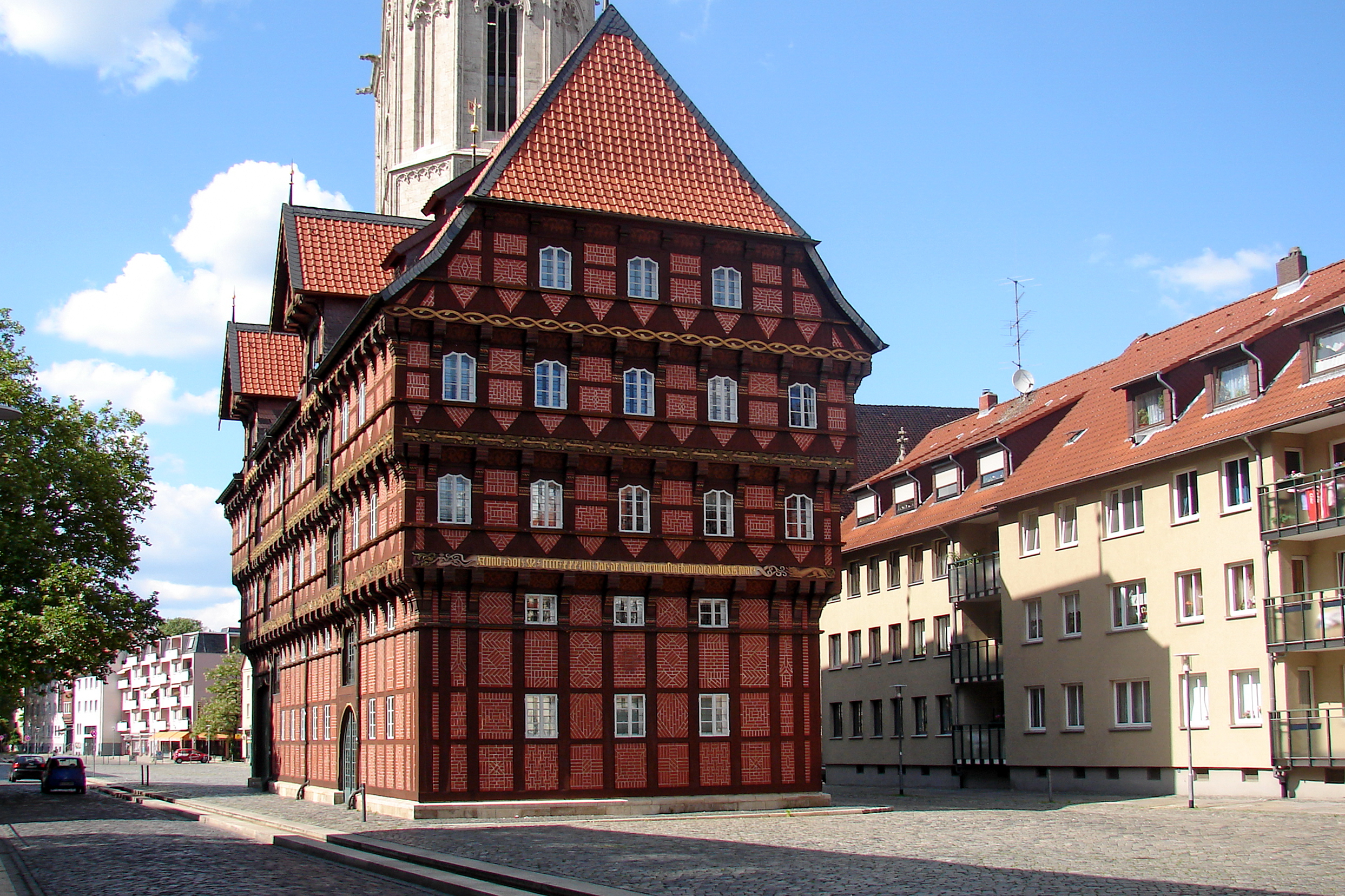
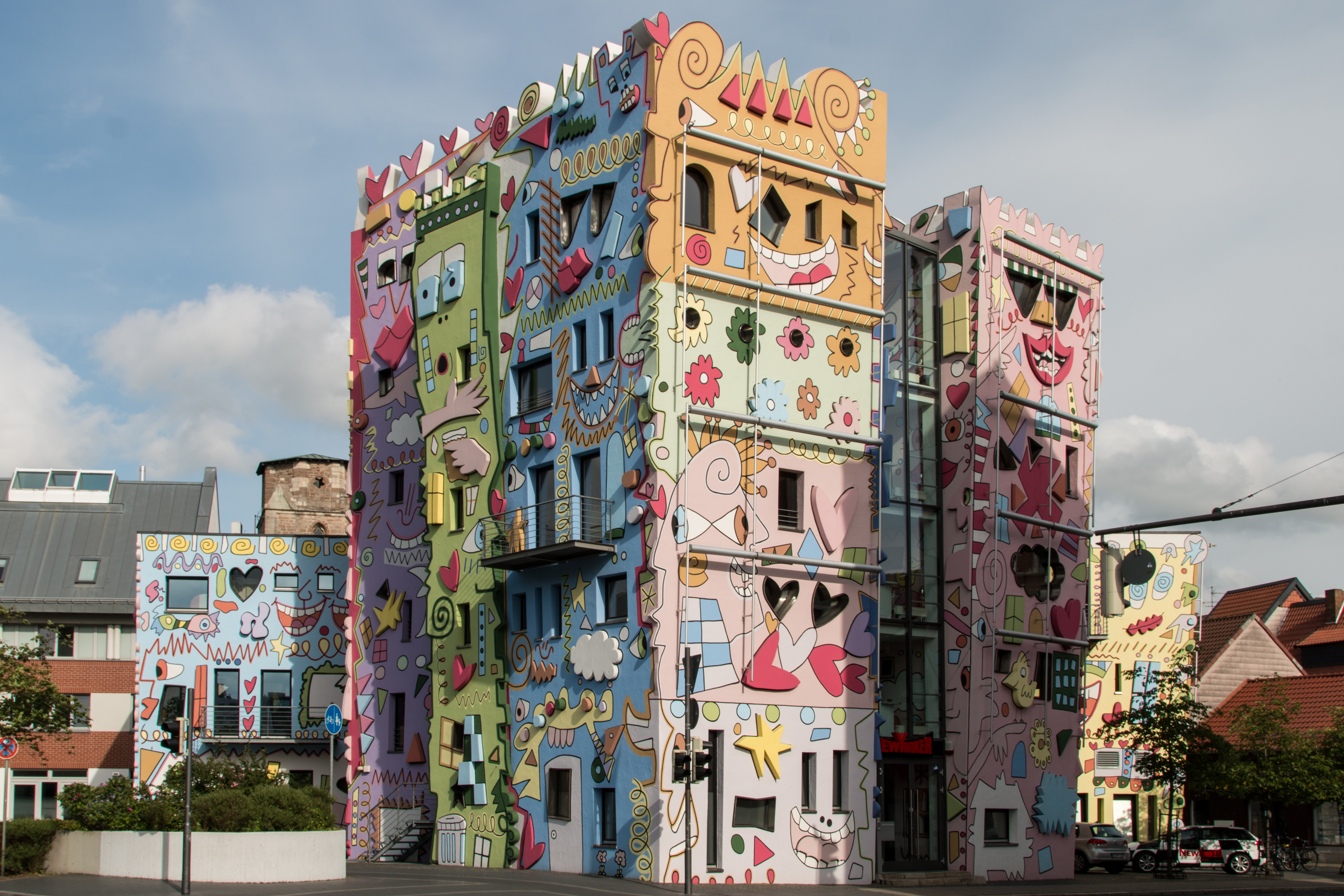
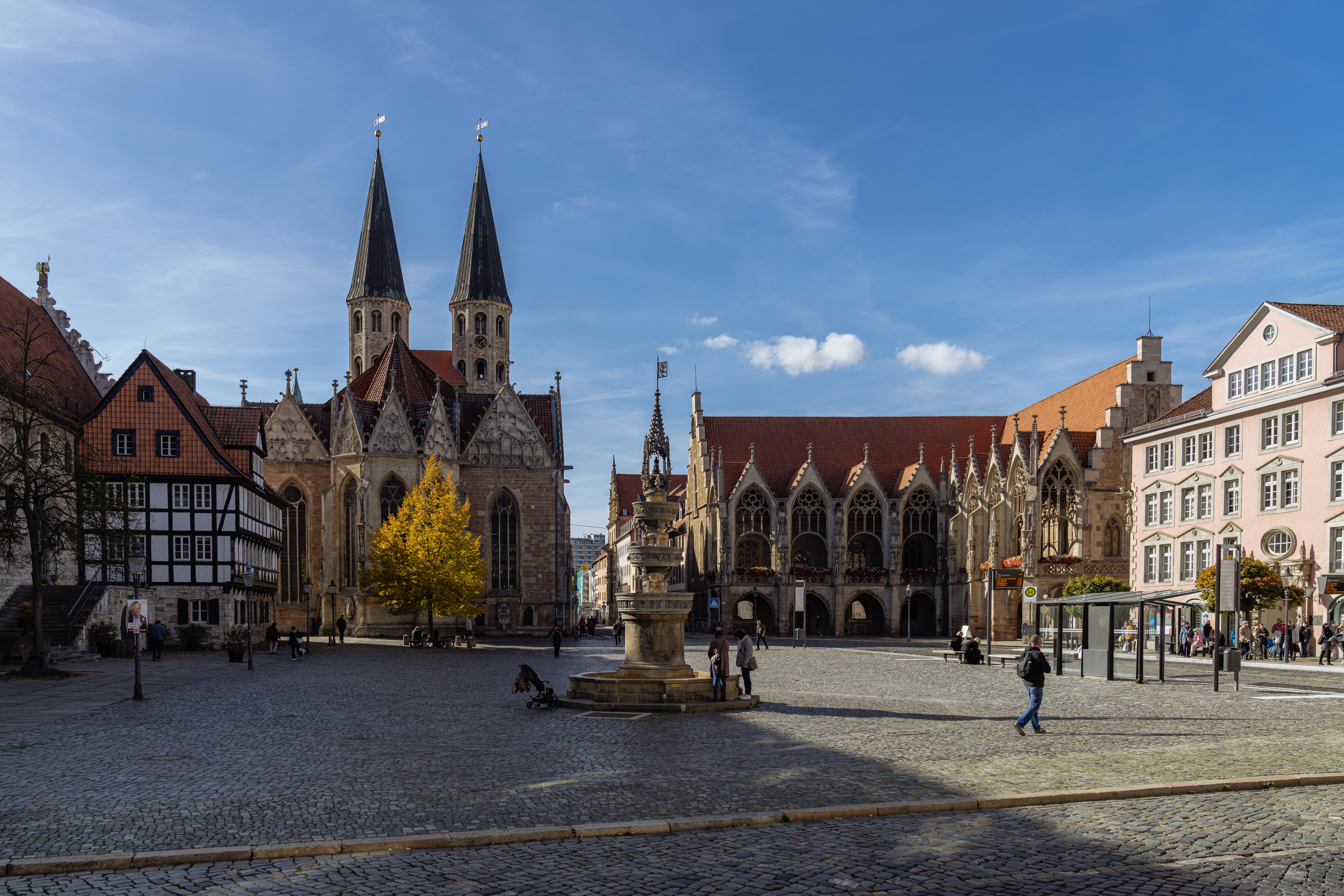
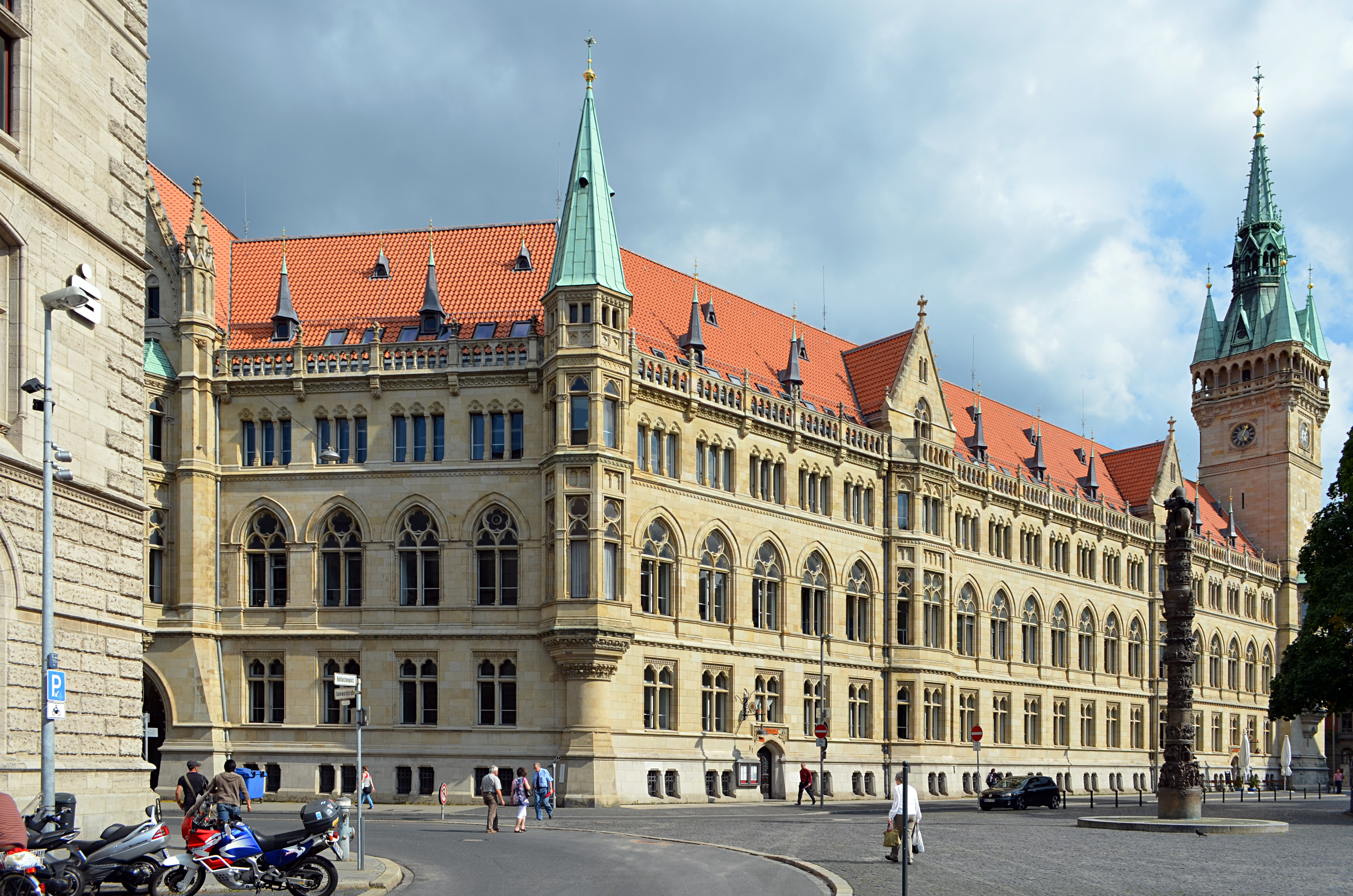
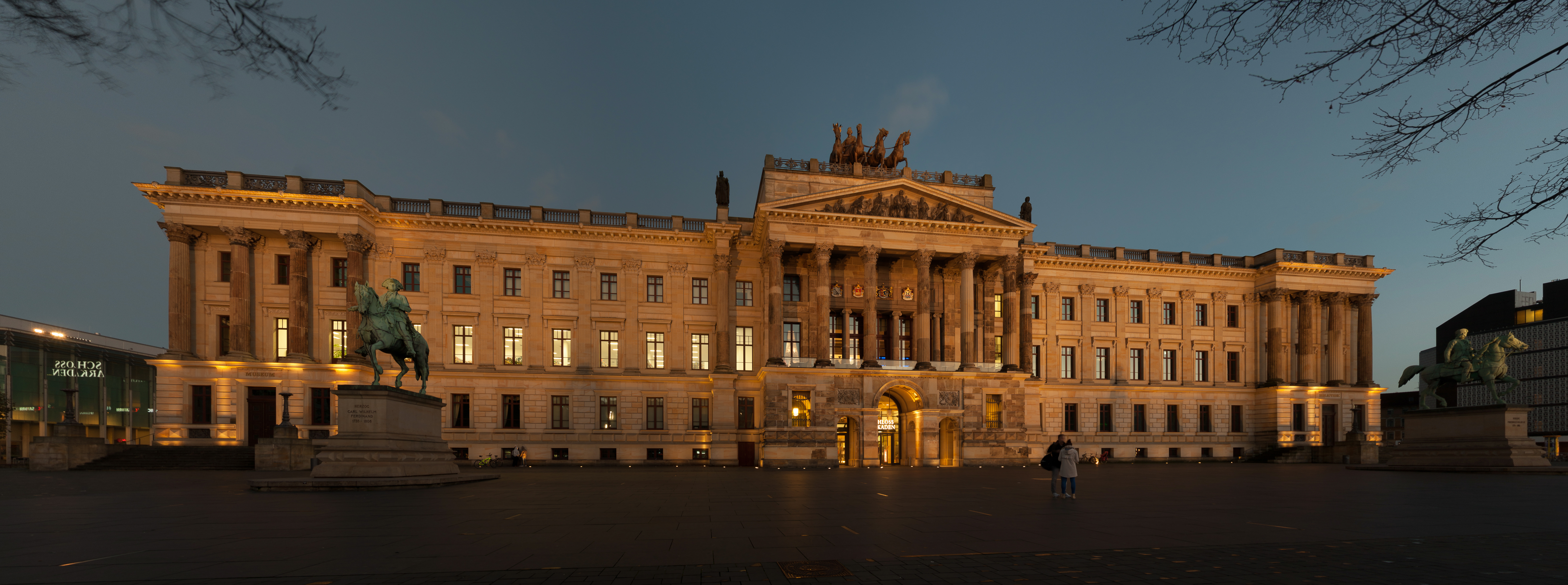
- Castle Square with Brunswick Cathedral, Dankwarderode Castle and the Brunswick Lion Alte Waage Happy Rizzi House Old Town Square Town Hall Brunswick Palace

- Flag Coat of arms

- Location of Brunswick within Lower Saxony
- Interactive map of Brunswick
- Location within Germany Location within Lower Saxony
- Coordinates: 52°16′N 10°31′E
- Country: Germany
- State: Lower Saxony
- District: Urban district
- Founded: 9th century
- Subdivisions: 19 boroughs

Government
  - Mayor (2021–26): Thorsten Kornblum (SPD)

Area
  - City: 192.13 km^{2} (74.18 sq mi)
- Elevation: 75 m (246 ft)

Population (2025-12-31)
  - City: 252,811
  - Density: 1,315.8/km^{2} (3,408.0/sq mi)
  - Urban: 551,000
  - Metro: 1,659,853
- Time zone: UTC+01:00 (CET)
  - Summer (DST): UTC+02:00 (CEST)
- Postal codes: 38100–38126
- Dialling codes: 0531, 05307, 05309, 05300
- Vehicle registration: BS
- Website: Braunschweig.de

Braunschweig (German: [ˈbʁaʊnʃvaɪk]) or Brunswick (English: /ˈbrʌnzwɪk/ BRUN-zwik; from Low German Brunswiek, local dialect: Bronswiek [ˈbrɔˑnsviːk]) is a city in Lower Saxony, Germany, north of the Harz Mountains at the farthest navigable point of the river Oker, which connects it to the North Sea via the rivers Aller and Weser. In 2025, it had a population of 255,500. The Braunschweig-Wolfsburg-Salzgitter region had 1.02 million residents including the cities Wolfsburg and Salzgitter. It is the second largest urban center in Lower Saxony after Hanover. The urban agglomeration of Braunschweig had a population of 551,000 with over 40% having a migration background, making it the most diverse urban agglomeration in the whole state. The city consists of 42.2% immigrants (approximately 108,278) with a high number of migrants coming from other European countries, Asia and Africa. 73% of the Germans residing in Braunschweig come from different parts of the country, particularly North Rhine Westphalia, Hessen and the former states of East Germany. The city has one of the highest integrated proportions of migrants in the nation, having nearly 8 out of 10 people with migration background speak German on a daily basis. Braunschweig is considered an important regiopolis. It is one of the largest regiopolitan cities in Northern Germany and the largest regiopolis in Lower Saxony. The city is seen as a major hub within the region due to it having multiple characteristics of a metropolitan city on a smaller scale or in a comparative amount to other metropolitan cities in Germany.

144 km² (49 sq. mi.) of the city's area is made up of greenspaces such as parks and forests. Braunschweig has a population density of 5 323 per km² (13 787 per sq. mi.) excluding the green areas because only about 48 km² (25½ sq. mi.) of the total area is properly urban, making it quite a dense city and one of the densest cities by urban core density. Many districts of the city have a density over 4,450 people per square kilometer (11,525 per sq. mi.) such as Weststadt, Innenstadt, Westliches Ringgebiet, Nordstadt, or Östliches Ringgebiet. The densest quarter of the city is Hagenquarter with a population of 7,528, being 0.25 km² and a density of 30,112 per km². followed by the south side of Westliches Ringgebiet (South of cyriaksring) with a population of 8,436 and an area of 0.31 km², a density of 27,213 ; Kultviertel, being 0.26 km² and having 5,233 residents makes the quarter's density 20,127 per km²; Emsviertel(Weststadt) having 5,023 residents, and area of 0.33km2 making the density 15,221 and Schwarzer Berg with 0.45 km² of area and a population of 4,800 and a density of 10,667. Due to the city's limited urban core and efforts in preserving green spaces, 81% of the residential buildings are multi-storey apartments limiting 74% of the flats with a space below 100 square meters (1000 sq. ft.). The city is constructing more residential areas within city limits so that by 2030 the population increases by 15.000 from 2014.

A powerful and influential centre of commerce in medieval Germany, Brunswick was a member of the Hanseatic League from the 13th until the 17th century. It was the capital city of three successive states: the Principality of Brunswick-Wolfenbüttel (1269–1432, 1754–1807, and 1813–1814), the Duchy of Brunswick (1814–1918), and the Free State of Brunswick (1918–1946).

Today, Brunswick is the second-largest city in Lower Saxony and a major centre of scientific research and development.

== History ==
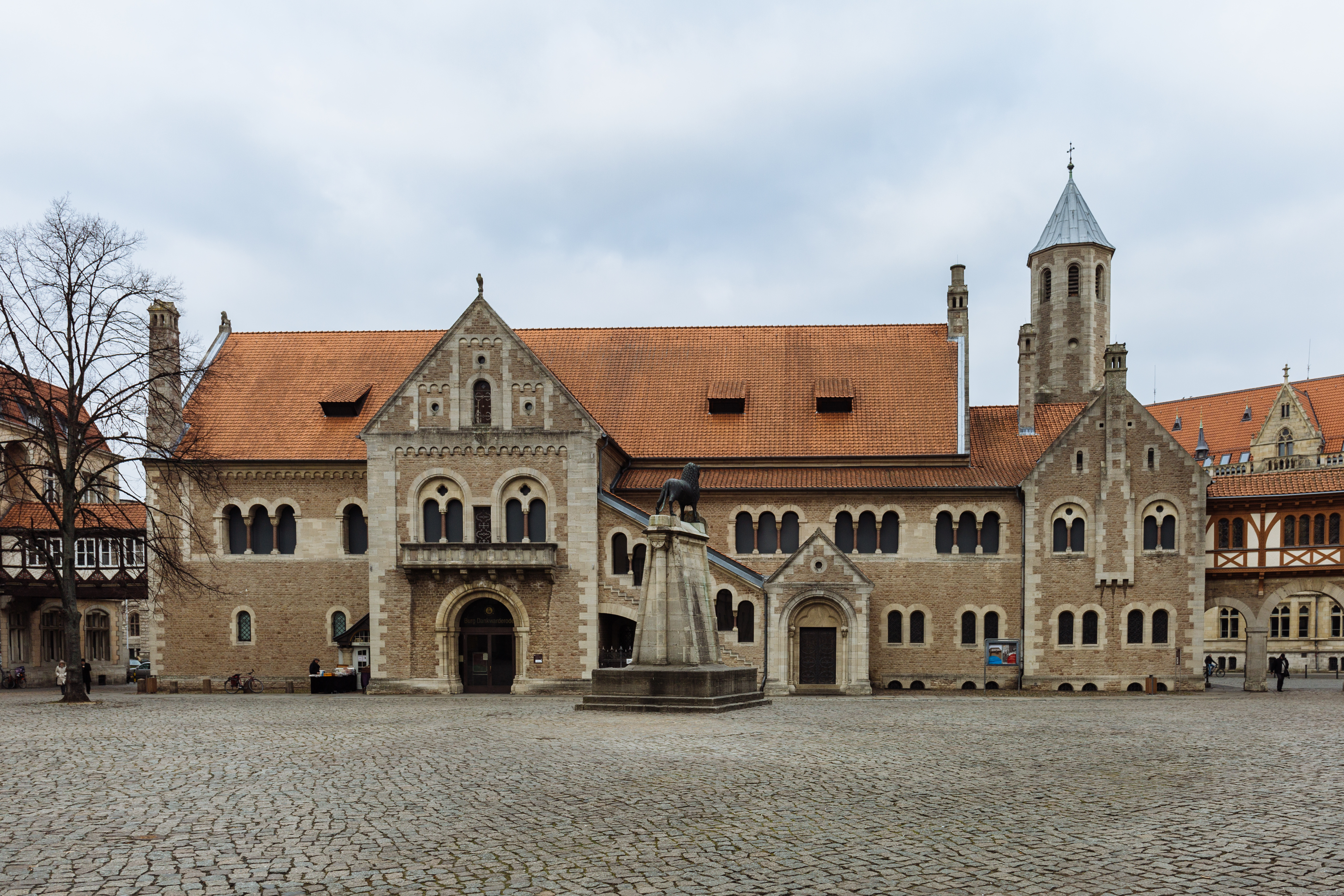
Dankwarderode Castle

=== Foundation and early history ===
The date and circumstances of the town's foundation are unknown. Tradition maintains that Brunswick was created through the merger of two settlements, one founded by Brun(o), a Saxon count who died in 880, on one side of the River Oker – the legend gives the year 861 for the foundation – and the other the settlement of a legendary Count Dankward, after whom Dankwarderode Castle (the "Castle of Dankward's clearing"), which was reconstructed in the 19th century, is named.

The town's original name of Brunswik may be a combination of the name Bruno and Low German wik (related to the Latin vicus), a place where merchants rested and stored their goods. The town's name, therefore, may indicate a resting place, consistent with its location by a ford across the Oker River. An alternative explanation of the city's name is that it comes from Brand, or burning, indicating a place which developed after the landscape was cleared through burning. The city was first mentioned in documents from the St. Magni Church from 1031, which give the city's name as Brunesguik.

=== Middle Ages and early modern period ===
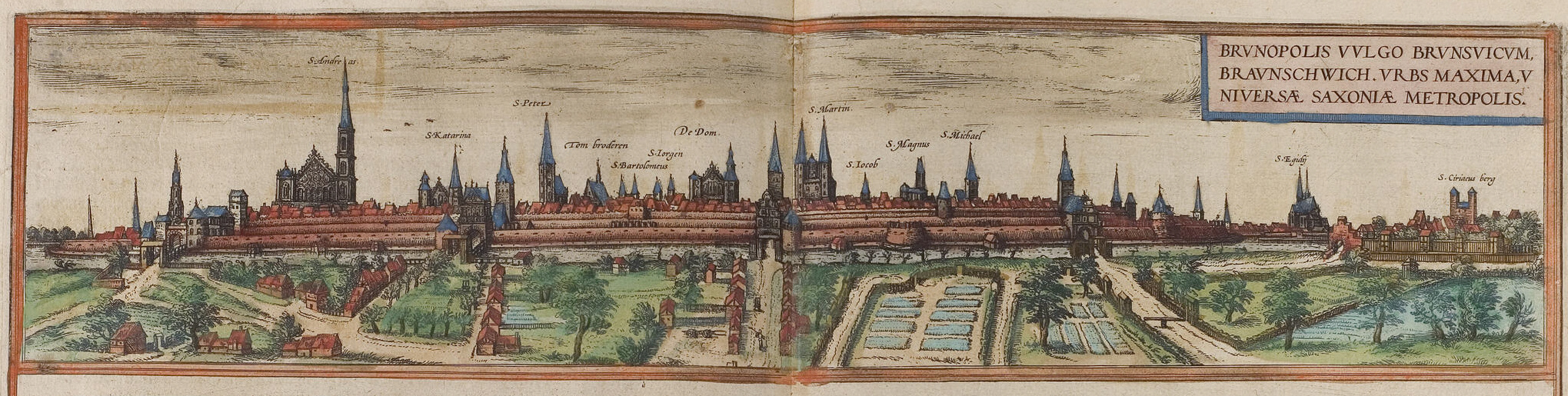
Brunswick in the 16th century, from the Civitates orbis terrarum by Georg Braun and Frans Hogenberg

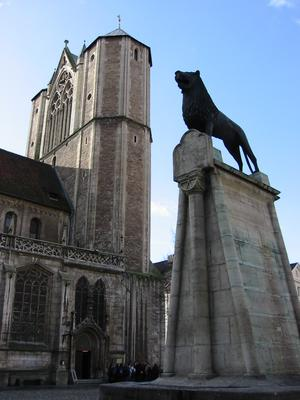
Brunswick Cathedral, St. Blasius, with lion statue

Up to the 12th century, Brunswick was ruled by the Saxon noble family of the Brunonids; then, through marriage, the town fell to the House of Welf. In 1142, Henry the Lion of the House of Welf became duke of Saxony and made Braunschweig the capital of his state (which, from 1156 on, also included the Duchy of Bavaria). He turned Dankwarderode Castle, at the time the residence of the counts of Brunswick, into his own Pfalz and developed the city further to represent his authority. Under Henry's rule, the Cathedral of St. Blasius was built and he also had the statue of a lion, his heraldic animal, erected in front of the castle. The lion subsequently became the city's landmark.

Henry the Lion became so powerful that he dared to refuse military aid to the Emperor Frederick I Barbarossa, which led to his banishment in 1182. Henry went into exile in England. He had previously established ties to the English crown in 1168, through his marriage to King Henry II of England's daughter Matilda, sister of Richard the Lionheart. However, Henry's son Otto, who regained influence and was eventually crowned Holy Roman Emperor, continued to foster the city's development.

During the Middle Ages, Brunswick was an important center of trade, one of the economic and political centers in Northern Europe and a member of the Hanseatic League from the 13th century to the middle of the 17th century. By the year 1600, Brunswick was the seventh largest city in Germany. Although formally one of the residences of the rulers of the Duchy of Brunswick-Lüneburg, a constituent state of the Holy Roman Empire, Brunswick was de facto ruled independently by a powerful class of patricians and the guilds throughout much of the Late Middle Ages and the Early modern period. Because of the growing power of Brunswick's burghers, the Princes of Brunswick-Wolfenbüttel, who ruled over one of the subdivisions of Brunswick-Lüneburg, finally moved their Residenz out of the city and to the nearby town of Wolfenbüttel in 1432. The Princes of Brunswick-Wolfenbüttel did not regain control over the city until the late 17th century, when Rudolph Augustus, Duke of Brunswick-Lüneburg, took the city by siege.

In the 18th century Brunswick was not only a political, but also a cultural centre. Influenced by the philosophy of the Enlightenment, dukes like Anthony Ulrich and Charles I became patrons of the arts and sciences. In 1745, Charles I founded the Collegium Carolinum, predecessor of the Brunswick University of Technology, and in 1753 he moved the ducal residence back to Brunswick. With this he attracted poets and thinkers such as Lessing, Leisewitz, and Jakob Mauvillon to his court and the city. Emilia Galotti by Lessing and Goethe's Faust were performed for the first time in Brunswick.

=== 19th century ===
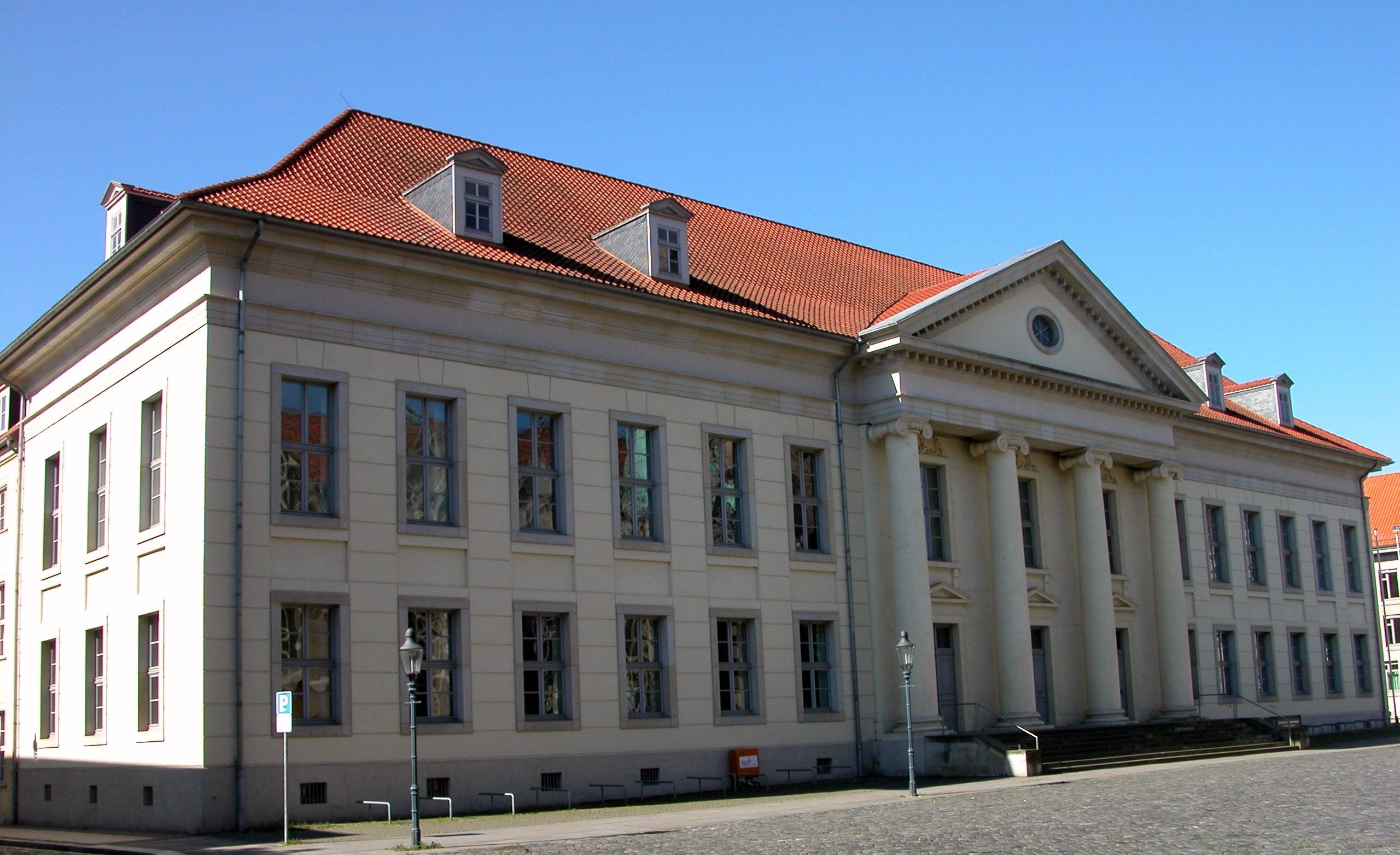
Landschaftliches Haus, Landtag building of the Duchy and the Free State of Brunswick

In 1806, the city was captured by the French during the Napoleonic Wars and became part of the short-lived Napoleonic Kingdom of Westphalia in 1807. The exiled Duke Frederick William raised a volunteer corps, the Black Brunswickers, who fought the French in several battles.

After the Congress of Vienna in 1815, Brunswick was made capital of the re-established independent Duchy of Brunswick, later a constituent state of the German Empire from 1871. In the aftermath of the July Revolution in 1830, in Brunswick duke Charles II was forced to abdicate. His absolutist governing style had previously alienated the nobility and bourgeoisie, while the lower classes were disaffected by the bad economic situation. During the night of 7–8 September 1830, the ducal palace in Brunswick was stormed by an angry mob, set on fire, and destroyed completely. Charles was succeeded by his brother William VIII. During William's reign, liberal reforms were made and Brunswick's parliament was strengthened.

During the 19th century, industrialisation caused a rapid growth of population in the city, eventually causing Brunswick to be for the first time significantly enlarged beyond its medieval fortifications and the River Oker. On 1 December 1838, the first section of the Brunswick–Bad Harzburg railway line connecting Brunswick and Wolfenbüttel opened as the first railway line in Northern Germany, operated by the Duchy of Brunswick State Railway.

=== Early to mid-20th century ===
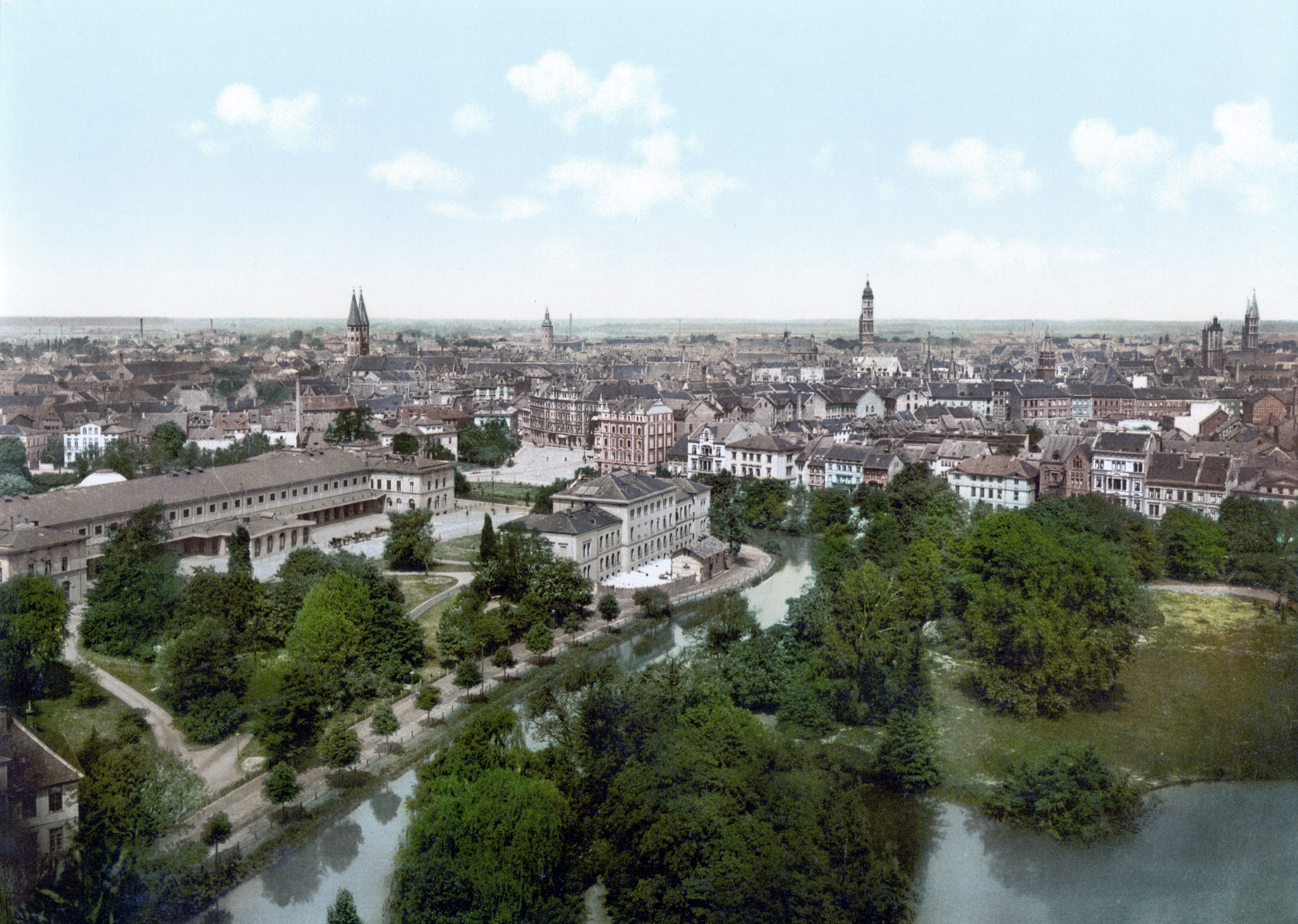
Braunschweig around 1900

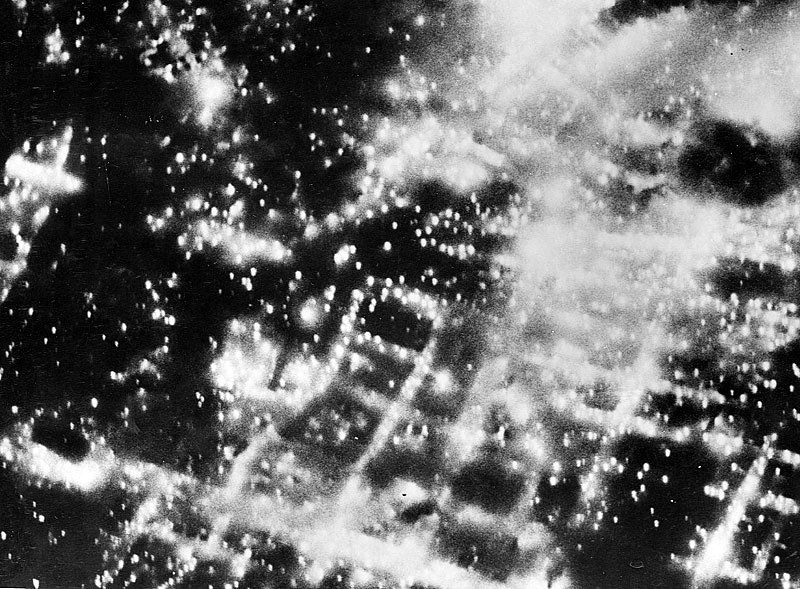
Braunschweig in the early hours of 15 October 1944

On 8 November 1918, at the end of World War I, a socialist workers' council forced Duke Ernest Augustus to abdicate. On 10 November, the council proclaimed the Socialist Republic of Brunswick under one-party government by the Independent Social Democratic Party of Germany (USPD); however, the subsequent Landtag election on 22 December 1918 was won by the Majority Social Democratic Party of Germany (MSPD), and the USPD and MSPD formed a coalition government. An uprising in Braunschweig in 1919, led by the communist Spartacus League, was defeated when Freikorps troops under Georg Ludwig Rudolf Maercker took over the city on order of the German Minister of Defence, Gustav Noske. An MSPD-led government was subsequently established; in December 1921, a new constitution was approved for the Free State of Brunswick, now a parliamentary republic within the Weimar Republic, again with Braunschweig as its capital.

After the Landtag election of 1930, Brunswick became the second state in Germany where the Nazis participated in government, when the National Socialist German Workers' Party (NSDAP) formed a coalition government with several conservative and right-wing parties. With the support of Dietrich Klagges, Brunswick's minister of the interior, the NSDAP organized a large SA rally in Braunschweig. On 17–18 October 1931, 100,000 SA stormtroopers marched through the city; street fights between Nazis, socialists, and communists left several dead or injured. On 25 February 1932, the state of Brunswick granted Adolf Hitler German citizenship to allow him to run in the 1932 German presidential election. In Braunschweig, Nazis carried out several attacks on political enemies, with the acquiescence of the state government.

After the Nazi seizure of power in 1933, several state institutions were placed in Braunschweig, including the Luftfahrtforschungsanstalt in Völkenrode, the Hitler Youth Academy for Youth Leadership, and the SS-Junkerschule Braunschweig. With the Reichswerke Hermann Göring in Salzgitter and the Stadt des KdF-Wagens, as well as several factories in the city itself (including Büssing and the Volkswagenwerk Braunschweig), the Braunschweig region became one of the centres of the German arms industry.

During the Second World War, Braunschweig was a sub-area headquarters of Wehrkreis XI (one of Germany's military districts), and was the garrison city of the 31st Infantry Division that took part in the invasions of Poland, Belgium, and France, largely being destroyed during its retreat following the invasion of Russia. In this period, thousands of Eastern workers were brought to the city as forced labor, and in the 1943–1945 period at least 360 children taken away from such workers died in the Entbindungsheim für Ostarbeiterinnen ("Maternity Ward for Eastern Workers").

In 1944, two subcamps of the Neuengamme concentration camp were established in Braunschweig. The subcamp Schillstraße or Büssing-NAG/Schillstraße, located where the BraWo Park's parking lot is today, held about 800 male prisoners, who were forced to work in the arms production at Büssing-NAG. After about 300 had died due to disease, hunger, and maltreatment over the course of just a few months, a further 200 were transferred to the infirmary of a nearby subcamp in early January 1945 in order to reduce the number of deaths. However, this was only effective to some degree, as another 80 bodies landed in the city's crematory until the subcamp's closing in March 1945, when Büssing-NAG had to halt production due to severe bombing damages. Today the Gedenkstätte Schillstraße, located very close to the former premises of the subcamp, documents Braunschweig's history during the Third Reich. Büssing-NAG also had another subcamp in the nearby Vechelde, which held a further 400 male prisoners.

The subcamp SS-Reitschule, named so as it was located on the former premises of the SS-Junker School's riding school, held approximately 800 prisoners, all female, who were tasked with clearing away rubble. This subcamp was commissioned by the city of Braunschweig. Although it was only open for two months - from December 1944 until February 1945, there were at least 17 deaths and a transfer of about 50 prisoners to a nearby subcamp's infirmary. The number of survivors is unknown.

Piera Sonnino (1922–1999), an Italian author, writes of her imprisonment in Braunschweig in her book, This Has Happened, published in English in 2006 by MacMillan Palgrave.

The Allied air raid on October 15, 1944, destroyed most of the city's churches, and the Altstadt (old town), the largest homogeneous ensemble of half-timbered houses in Germany. 100 out of 800 half-timbered houses survived as well as the most important places and streets, preserved in 5 areas of the old town.

The city's cathedral, which had been converted to a Nationale Weihestätte (national shrine) by the Nazi government, still stood.

=== Postwar period to the 21st century ===
About 10% of the inner city survived Allied bombing and remain to represent its distinctive architecture. The cathedral was restored to its function as a Protestant church. Outside the old town city centre large historic quarters remain like Östliches Ringgebiet with its Gründerzeit architecture.

Politically, after the war, the Free State of Brunswick was dissolved by the Allied occupying authorities, Braunschweig ceased to be a capital, and most of its lands were incorporated in the newly formed state of Lower Saxony.

During the Cold War, Braunschweig, then part of West Germany, suffered economically due to its proximity to the Iron Curtain. The city lost its historically strong economic ties to what was then East Germany; for decades, economic growth remained, on average, below the rest of the country while unemployment was above-average for West Germany.

On 28 February 1974, as part of a district reform in Lower Saxony, the rural district of Braunschweig, which had surrounded the city, was disestablished. The major part of the former district was incorporated into the city of Braunschweig, increasing its population by roughly 52,000 people.

In the 1990s, efforts increased to reconstruct historic buildings that had been destroyed in the air raid. The façade of the Braunschweiger Schloss was rebuilt, and buildings such as the Alte Waage (originally built in 1534) now stand again.

== Population ==
Historical population
Year	Pop.	±%
1330	16,000	—
1758	22,500	+40.6%
1788	26,000	+15.6%
1811	27,600	+6.2%
1830	35,300	+27.9%
1849	39,000	+10.5%
1880	75,000	+92.3%
1890	100,000	+33.3%
1900	128,200	+28.2%
1925	146,900	+14.6%
1939	196,068	+33.5%
1951	231,091	+17.9%
1956	240,431	+4.0%
1961	246,085	+2.4%
1966	234,665	−4.6%
1971	222,805	−5.1%
1976	268,519	+20.5%
1981	260,342	−3.0%
1986	247,836	−4.8%
1990	258,833	+4.4%
2001	245,516	−5.1%
2011	242,537	−1.2%
2021	251,316	+3.6%
Population size may be affected by changes in administrative divisions.

Braunschweig has a population of 255,500 and is the 2nd largest city in Lower Saxony. Braunschweig is considered as one of the oldest cities in Germany, founded in 1031 by Henry the Lion. Braunschweig first reached its peak of over 100,000 in 1890. In the 1960s and 1970s industrialization boomed in Braunschweig due to automobile and other companies coming to Braunschweig and surrounding cities like Wolfsburg and Salzgitter. Braunschweig's population reached its highest peak of population in 1975 with population of about 273,000 and is expected to exceed this count during the year 2030. Braunschweig's population started to decline in the 1980s as emigration rates rose and a strong labour shortage started. In the 1990s - after the German reunification - it began to grow again as many East Germans moved there due to its close proximity to former East Germany, 75% of the Germans living in Braunschweig come from different parts of Germany; most are from Former East Germany, Hessen and North Rhine Westphalia. Many migrants from neighbouring eastern nations came to the city to help with labour shortage.

Currently, Braunschweig has a strong focus on research and development. According to 2019 data, it has the highest R&D intensity (ratio of R&D expenditure to GDP) in the entire EU and over 4% of all employed people are R&D personnel. The population is also expected to increase by 20% by the year 2030 from 2020.

=== Religion ===
In 2015, 91,785 people (or 36.3% of the population) were Protestant and 34,604 (13.7%) people were Roman Catholic; 126,379 people (50.0%) either adhered to other denominations or followed no religion.

=== Islam ===
Roughly 30,200 Muslims (11.8% of the population) were in Braunschweig during 2025. Mosques like DMK Moschee, Fatih Moschee Braunschweig and cultural clubs are present throughout the city but mosque buildings with minarets have not been built in Braunschweig but can be seen in its urban area for example the Grüne Moschee in Wolfenbüttel, Fatih Moschee Salzgitter and the Albanischer-Kulturverein in Gifhorn. The region had around 95,000 to 105,000 Muslims, accounting to approximately 10% of the total region's population.

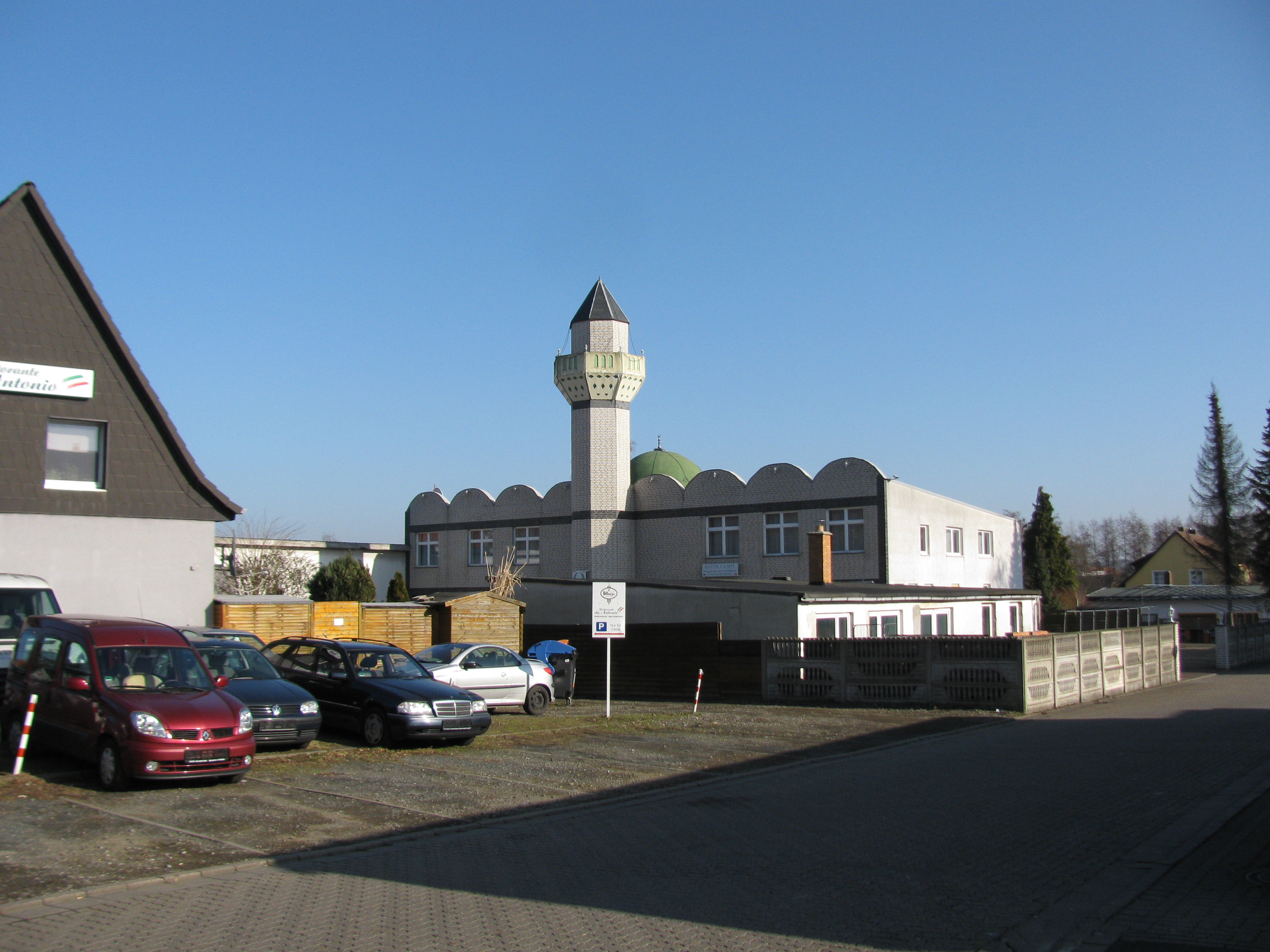
Salzgitter Fatih Moschee

=== Immigration ===
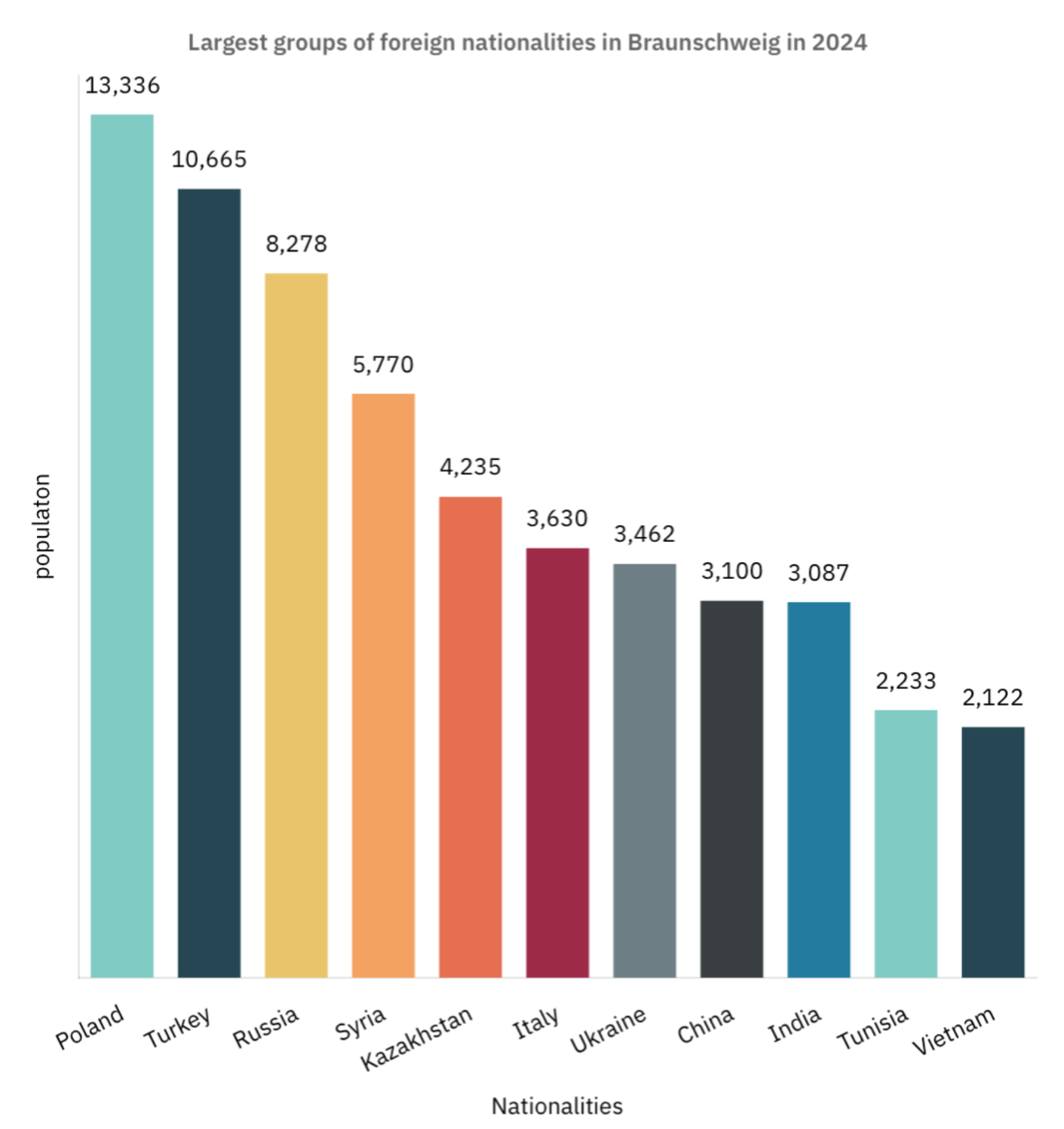
Largest groups of foreigners and those with foreign backgrounds in Braunschweig as of 2024

A total of 108,278 of Braunschweig's residents, including citizens with second passport, had a migration background in 2025 (42.2% of the total population). People from over 175 nations live in Braunschweig, contributing to its cosmopolitan atmosphere and demographics. Among the 42.2% of people with a migration background, 27.7% or 70,828 were Non-German citizens or Germans with a second passport but without a migration background. A high proportion of foreigners in the city come from Asia and Africa, something not seen in many cities in a similar size range. One of the main asylums, for refugees and asylum seekers, of Lower Saxony is located in Braunschweig as well as multiple smaller asylums are present throughout the city too, contributing to a higher amount of migrants and refugees in the city compared to other parts of the state though a high number of them are not counted as residents. The city's universities and interest in increasing the number of families from foreign countries has led to a higher trend in immigration. Braunschweig has had a relatively stable population because of multiple housing restrictions and other factors but many Germans are leaving the city so in order to take up their spaces, many foreigners are coming to the city. Multiple residential areas are being constructed in order to withstand the high inflow of migrants to the city.

The city has the highest number of indian, chinese, maghrebi, colombian and cameroonian communities in the state. It is the most diverse city in Lower Saxony in terms of the number of people from different nationalities and ethnicities.

Weststadt has the highest migration percentage of all districts being 63.2%, followed by Nordstadt-Schunteraue with 55.8%, Westliches Ringgebiet with 52.4% and Mitte with 49.6%. The following table lists up the largest minority groups, including citizens with a migration background from a specific nation or region:

Nationality	Population (31 Mar 2024)
Poland	13,303
Turkey	10,665
Russia	8,278
Syria	5,770
Kazakhstan	4,235
Italy	3,630
Ukraine	3,462
China	3,100
India	3,087
Cameroon	2,233
Tunisia	2,215
Serbia	2,122
Croatia	2,044
Portugal	2,028
Romania	1,502
Iran	1,382
Greece	1,307
Spain	1,278
Algeria	1,207
Ghana	1,100
Afghanistan	1,003
Nigeria	871
Brazil	786
Thailand	776
Bulgaria	723

Numbers of people with migration background by continent
Continent	Population (31 Mar 2024)	Percentage
Asia	43,537	41.9%
Europe(excluding Germany)	38,734	39.7%
Africa	15,398	14.4%
South America	3,143	3.1%
North America	1,090	1.1%
Oceania	254	0.2%
Total	102,156	100.0%

43,537 residents in the city are from Asia and largest groups of people from Asia are Turkey (10.665), Syria (5.770), Kazakhstan (4.235), China (3.100) and India (3.085).

From other European countries, there are 38,734 residents with majority of the people coming from Poland (13.365), Russia (8.278), Italy (3.630) and Ukraine (3.462).

15,398 people with African descent live in the city. Majority are from Cameroon (2.233), Tunisia (2.215), Algeria (1.207), Ghana (1.100) and Nigeria (871).

The combined population of residents with descent from both Americas is 4,233 with the two most common nations present being Brazil (786) and Colombia (713).

=== Urban agglomeration ===
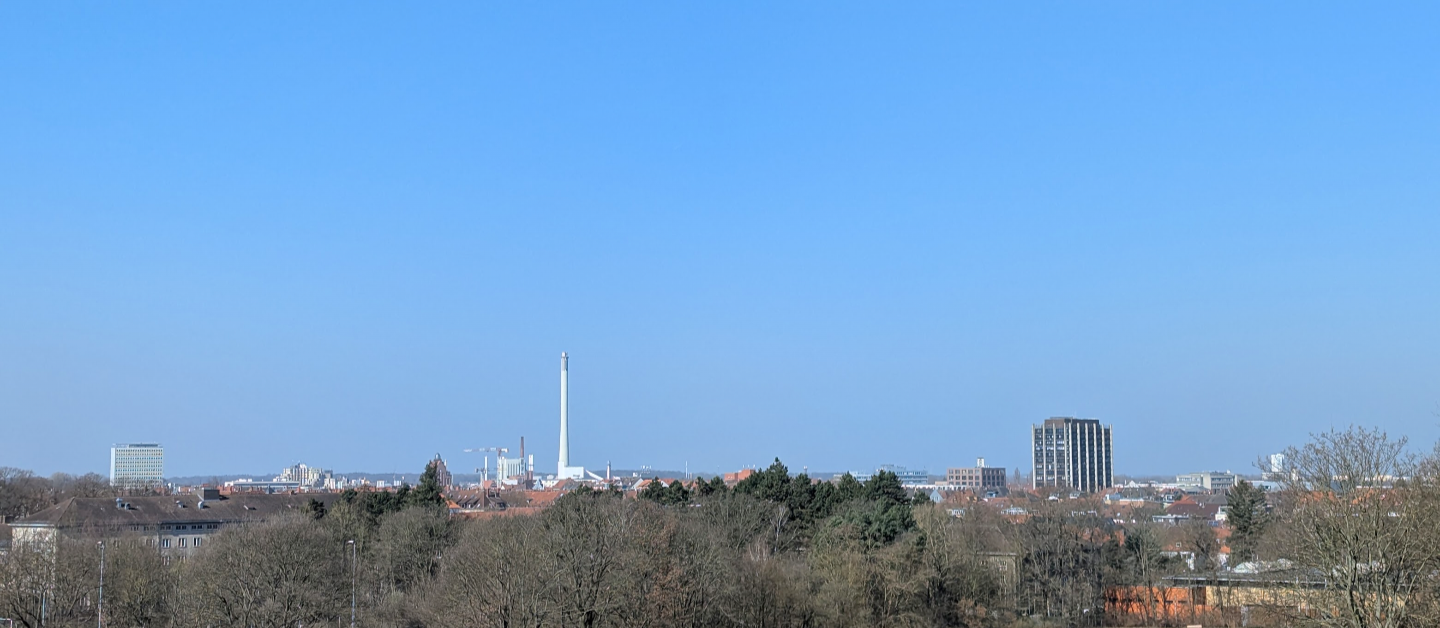
Nördliches Ringgebiet borough view from Nußberg

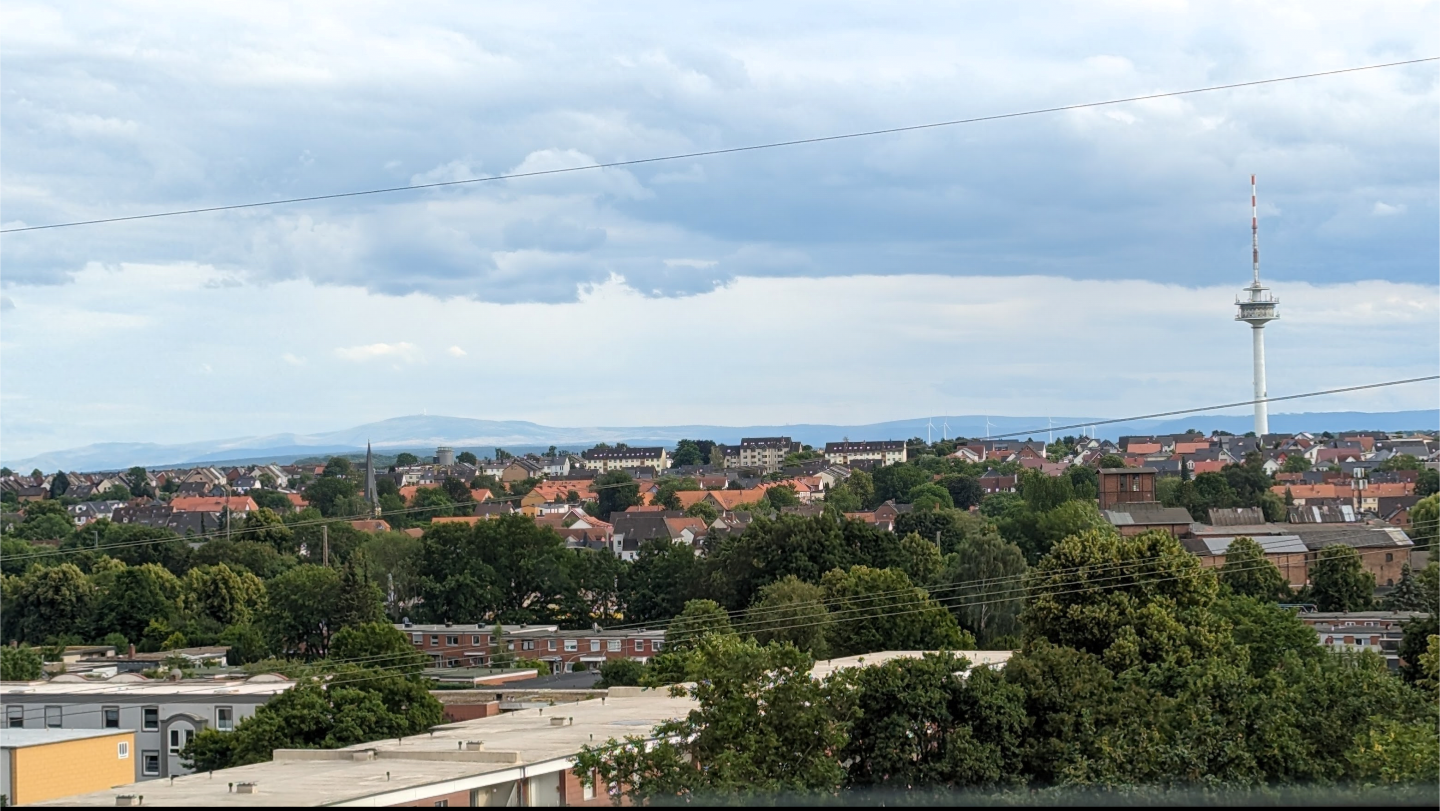
Borough Broitzem with TV tower on the right side

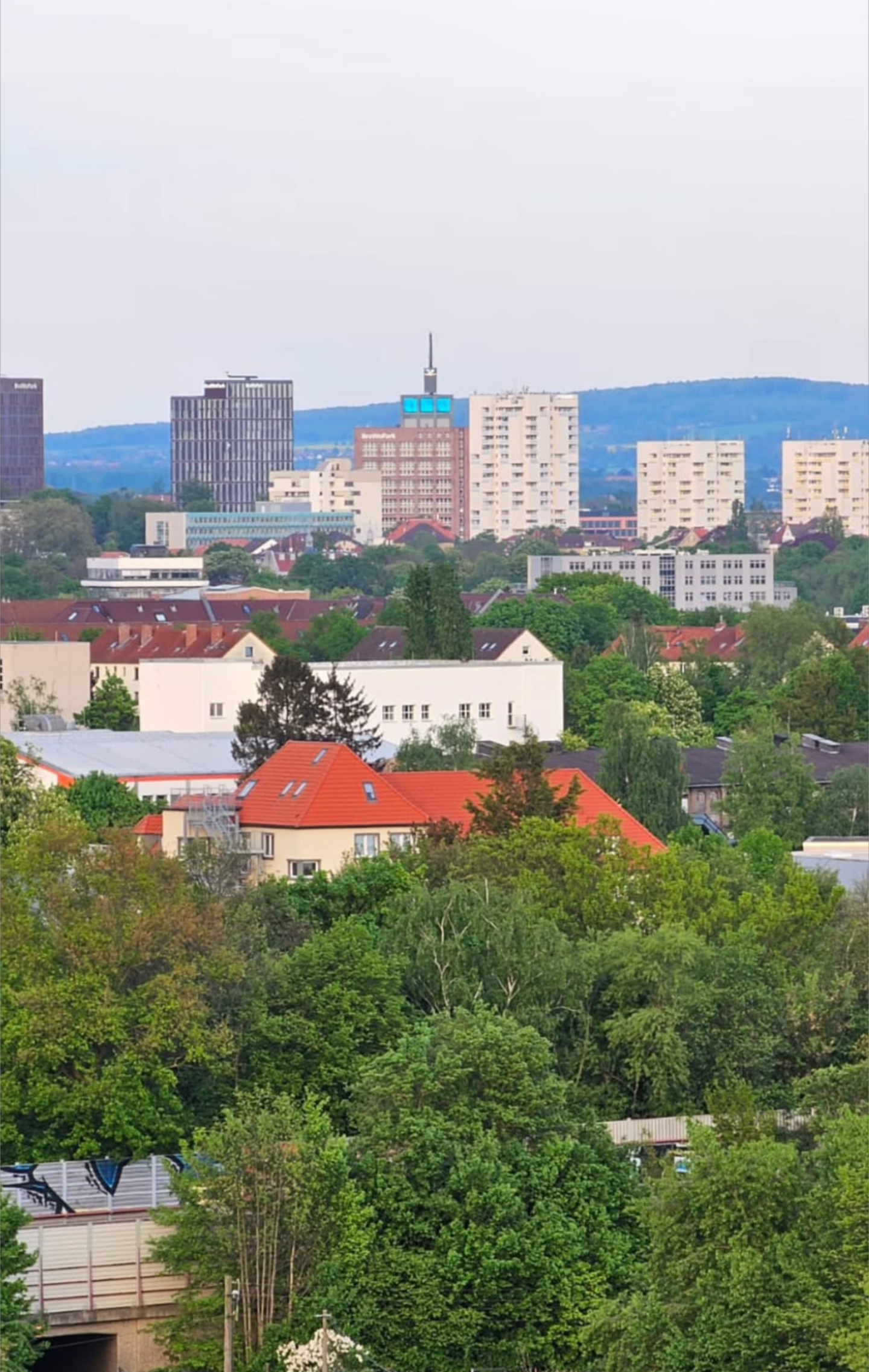
Braunschweig main station area's high rises from distance.

The urban agglomeration area of Braunschweig is approximately 551,000 in 2024, making it one of the largest regiopolis in Germany and the largest one in Lower Saxony. This area includes Wolfenbüttel, Meine, northern parts of Salzgitter, Weddel, Sickte, Timmerlah, Lengede and other towns and regions within a 15 kilometer (10 mile) radius though Salzgitter is an exception being 20 kilometers (12 miles) away. The field area and green spaces are not counted because a high amount of the areas are not registered. Braunschweig's urban area makes it a bigger city compared to others with a similar size e.g. Aachen, Wiesbaden or Gelsenkirchen, and since the urban area is not significantly smaller than Hanover, it makes itself an important and major city in Lower Saxony. Companies like New Yorker, Salzgitter AG, Jägermeister, Siemens, Bosch, Volkswagen, Nordzucker, Continental, Kosatec and others are headquartered or have a branch in this area.

The metropolitan population of Braunschweig is 1.66 million and is considered as Region Braunschweig, including cities and towns such as Wolfsburg, Goslar or Gifhorn, which is the further range of Braunschweig and is not the same as the smaller ranged urban aggomeration. The metropolitan region of Braunschweig is a subdivision of the larger Metropolregion Hannover-Braunschweig-Göttingen-Wolfsburg.

==== Information about the urban agglomeration in 2024 ====
Est. population of the areas within the urban agglomeration of Braunschweig
Place	Population within the agglomeration	Area in km² excluding green spaces	Population density per km²	Percentile of people with a migration background
Urban Agglomeration	551,628	215.3	2,563	40.1%
Braunschweig	255,500	48	5,323	42.2%
Salzgitter(Nord, Ost, Nord-Ost)	76,500	22.2	3,446	64.2%
Wolfenbüttel(Kernstadt)	53,300	14.5	3,655	30.2%
Kreis Gifhorn	62 000	30.2	2,053	30.2%
Kreis Wolfenbüttel	47 000	38.7	1,233	20.1%
Kreis Peine	41 500	17.3	2,398	33.5%

The population of the urban aggomeration with a migration background in 2024 was 246,995: almost 45% of the population. This makes the agglomeration one of the most diverse in Germany and the most in Lower Saxony. Over 70% of the Germans in the urban agglomeration come from different parts of Germany with most of them coming from eastern States due to the proximity. The city is unique because unlike most cities with immigrant populations concentrated inside the city itself, higher number of migrant populations are also found in surrounding areas. Braunschweig's urban agglomeration has a higher migration percentage compared to its city due to industrialization and other major factors since 2011. One of the largest Chinese, Indian, Cameroonian, Russians, Polish, Vietnamese and Tunisian populations in Germany are located in Braunschweig.

Largest nationality groups in the urban aggomeration (including citizens with a migration background and a second passport)
Countries predominant in the urban area	Population (31 Mar 2024)
Germany	304,333
Turkey	21,678
Poland	18,439
Russia	15,783
Syria	11,332
Ukraine	9,346
Kazakhstan	7,210
Albania	6,543
Romania	6,423
Italy	6,218
Iran	5,741
Iraq	5,238
Tunisia	4,637
Croatia	4,472
China	4,212
Bulgaria	4,200
India	4,124
Cameroon	3,478
Spain	3,430
Algeria	3,234
Kosovo	3,200
Afghanistan	2,760

=== Braunschweig-Salzgitter-Wolfsburg Area ===
The three cities form a Oberzentren and a sub-metropolitan area. The area is primarily dependent on the steel, automotive and R&D industries. The population of the area is a bit over 1 million (1,014,477) as of 2023. The three main cities have a total population of 512,600, where over half the population lives. The area has 40.6% of the population with a migration background. The area contributes highly to the economy of the country especially due to Volkswagen, Siemens, Salzgitter AG and other companies. The area has one of the highest GDP per Capita in the whole of Europe with Wolfsburg having the highest in the whole country and Braunschweig having one of the highest.

== Climate ==
Braunschweig's climate is classified as oceanic (Köppen: Cfb; Trewartha: Dobk). The average annual temperature in Braunschweig is 9.9 °C (49.8 °F). The average annual rainfall is 614.8 mm (24.20 in) with July as the wettest month. The temperatures are highest on average in July, at around 18.7 °C (65.7 °F), and lowest in January, at around 1.8 °C (35.2 °F).

The Braunschweig weather station has recorded the following extreme values:

- Highest Temperature 38.3 °C (100.9 °F) on 20 July 2022.
- Warmest Minimum 22.6 °C (72.7 °F) on 10 July 2010.
- Coldest Maximum −17.5 °C (0.5 °F) on 11 February 1929.
- Lowest Temperature −26.3 °C (−15.3 °F) on 11 February 1929.
- Highest Daily Precipitation 79.9 mm (3.15 in) on 17 July 2002.
- Wettest Month 212.6 mm (8.37 in) in July 2002.
- Wettest Year 989.3 mm (38.95 in) in 2002.
- Driest Year 295.7 mm (11.64 in) in 1959.
- Earliest Snowfall: 4 October 1925.
- Latest Snowfall: 22 April 1929.
- Longest annual sunshine: 2,128.2 hours in 2018.
- Shortest annual sunshine: 1,270.4 hours in 1960.

Climate data for Braunschweig (1991–2020 normals, extremes 1891–present (Note: Meteorological observations have been carried out in Braunschweig since 1891. The data used from 1 January 1891 to 31 December 1947 are from the Braunschweig (T.H.) weather station, the data used from 1 January 1948 to 31 December 1960 are from the Braunschweig-Gliesmarode weather station, and the weather station used since 1 January 1961 to the present is the Braunschweig weather station.))
Month	Jan	Feb	Mar	Apr	May	Jun	Jul	Aug	Sep	Oct	Nov	Dec	Year
Record high °C (°F)	15.9 (60.6)	19.4 (66.9)	24.4 (75.9)	29.8 (85.6)	35.4 (95.7)	35.8 (96.4)	38.3 (100.9)	38.2 (100.8)	33.7 (92.7)	27.6 (81.7)	21.5 (70.7)	17.6 (63.7)	38.3 (100.9)
Mean maximum °C (°F)	11.3 (52.3)	12.7 (54.9)	17.4 (63.3)	22.7 (72.9)	27.2 (81.0)	30.1 (86.2)	31.8 (89.2)	32.3 (90.1)	26.7 (80.1)	21.3 (70.3)	15.6 (60.1)	11.9 (53.4)	33.9 (93.0)
Mean daily maximum °C (°F)	4.1 (39.4)	5.2 (41.4)	9.0 (48.2)	14.5 (58.1)	18.5 (65.3)	21.6 (70.9)	23.9 (75.0)	23.7 (74.7)	19.3 (66.7)	13.8 (56.8)	8.2 (46.8)	4.9 (40.8)	13.9 (57.0)
Daily mean °C (°F)	1.8 (35.2)	2.4 (36.3)	5.2 (41.4)	9.6 (49.3)	13.5 (56.3)	16.6 (61.9)	18.7 (65.7)	18.4 (65.1)	14.5 (58.1)	10.1 (50.2)	5.7 (42.3)	2.8 (37.0)	9.9 (49.8)
Mean daily minimum °C (°F)	−0.7 (30.7)	−0.5 (31.1)	1.5 (34.7)	4.6 (40.3)	8.3 (46.9)	11.4 (52.5)	13.6 (56.5)	13.5 (56.3)	10.2 (50.4)	6.6 (43.9)	3.1 (37.6)	0.4 (32.7)	6.0 (42.8)
Mean minimum °C (°F)	−10.0 (14.0)	−8.2 (17.2)	−4.3 (24.3)	−1.7 (28.9)	2.3 (36.1)	6.5 (43.7)	9.2 (48.6)	8.2 (46.8)	4.4 (39.9)	−0.2 (31.6)	−3.3 (26.1)	−7.4 (18.7)	−12.2 (10.0)
Record low °C (°F)	−23.6 (−10.5)	−26.3 (−15.3)	−16.5 (2.3)	−7.3 (18.9)	−2.7 (27.1)	1.3 (34.3)	5.3 (41.5)	4.6 (40.3)	−0.1 (31.8)	−6.9 (19.6)	−18.3 (−0.9)	−20.9 (−5.6)	−26.3 (−15.3)
Average precipitation mm (inches)	50.3 (1.98)	35.2 (1.39)	43.2 (1.70)	38.8 (1.53)	54.8 (2.16)	54.2 (2.13)	70.6 (2.78)	66.6 (2.62)	51.1 (2.01)	53.6 (2.11)	48.1 (1.89)	48.4 (1.91)	614.8 (24.20)
Average extreme snow depth cm (inches)	4.6 (1.8)	3.8 (1.5)	1.9 (0.7)	0 (0)	0 (0)	0 (0)	0 (0)	0 (0)	0 (0)	0 (0)	0.6 (0.2)	3.6 (1.4)	7.3 (2.9)
Average precipitation days (≥ 0.1 mm)	17.3	15.3	15.0	12.3	13.9	13.5	15.5	14.2	13.0	15.6	16.7	17.8	180.1
Average snowy days (≥ 1.0 cm)	6.0	5.3	1.9	0	0	0	0	0	0	0	0.8	4.3	19.2
Average relative humidity (%)	84.9	81.6	76.8	69.7	70.4	71.2	71.0	71.9	77.5	83.0	86.4	86.0	77.6
Mean monthly sunshine hours	52.4	74.1	123.4	186.3	222.6	229.2	225.0	212.5	159.1	112.5	54.1	41.5	1,692.6
Source 1: NOAA
Source 2: DWD Open Data

== Main sights ==
- The Burgplatz (Castle Square), comprising a group of buildings of great historical and cultural significance: the Cathedral (St Blasius, built at the end of the 12th century); the Burg Dankwarderode (Dankwarderode Castle) (a 19th-century reconstruction of the old castle of Henry the Lion); the Neo-Gothic Town Hall (built in 1893–1900); as well as some picturesque half-timbered houses, such as the Gildehaus (Guild House), today the seat of the Craftsman's Association. In the centre of the square stands a copy of the Burglöwe (Brunswick Lion), a Romanesque statue of a lion, cast in bronze in 1166. The original statue can be seen in the museum of Dankwarderode Castle. The lion remains the symbol of Braunschweig today.
- The Altstadtmarkt ("Old Town market"), surrounded by the Old Town town hall (built between the 13th and the 15th centuries in Gothic style), and the Martinikirche (Church of Saint Martin, from 1195), with important historical houses including the Gewandhaus (the former house of the drapers' guild, built sometime before 1268) and the Stechinelli-Haus (built in 1690) and a fountain from 1408.
- The Kohlmarkt ("coal market"), a market with many historical houses and a fountain from 1869.
- The Hagenmarkt ("Hagen market"), with the 13th-century Katharinenkirche (Church of Saint Catherine) and the Heinrichsbrunnen ("Henry the Lion's Fountain") from 1874.
- The Magniviertel (St Magnus' Quarter), a remainder of ancient Braunschweig, lined with cobblestoned streets, little shops and cafés, centred on the 13th-century Magnikirche (St Magnus' Church). Here is also the Rizzi-Haus, a highly distinctive, cartoonish office building designed by architect James Rizzi for the Expo 2000.
- The Romanesque and Gothic Andreaskirche (Church of Saint Andrew), built mainly between the 13th and 16th centuries with stained glass by Charles Crodel. Surrounding the church are the Liberei, the oldest surviving freestanding library building in Germany, and the reconstructed Alte Waage.
- The Gothic Aegidienkirche (Church of Saint Giles), built in the 13th century, with an adjoining monastery, which is today a museum.
- The Staatstheater (State Theatre), newly built in the 19th century, goes back to the first standing public theatre in Germany, founded in 1690 by Duke Anthony Ulrich.
- The ducal palace of Braunschweig was bombed in World War II and demolished in 1960. The exterior was rebuilt to contain a palace museum, a library and a shopping centre, which opened in 2007.
- The baroque palace Schloss Richmond ("Richmond Palace"), built between 1768 and 1769 with a surrounding English garden for Princess Augusta of Great Britain, wife of Charles William Ferdinand, Duke of Brunswick-Wolfenbüttel, to remind her of her home in England.
- The BraWoPark is a shopping and a business center near Braunschweig Hauptbahnhof ("Braunschweig Central Station") and contains three office towers, with the tallest having a height of 90 meters (300 feet).
- Riddagshausen Abbey (German: Kloster Riddagshausen), a former Cistercian monastery, with the surrounding nature reserve and arboretum. The nature reserve Riddagshäuser Teiche is designated as an Important Bird Area and Special Protection Area.
- Gründerzeit quarters like östliches Ringgebiet, westliches Ringgebiet and Nordstadt-Schunteraue.
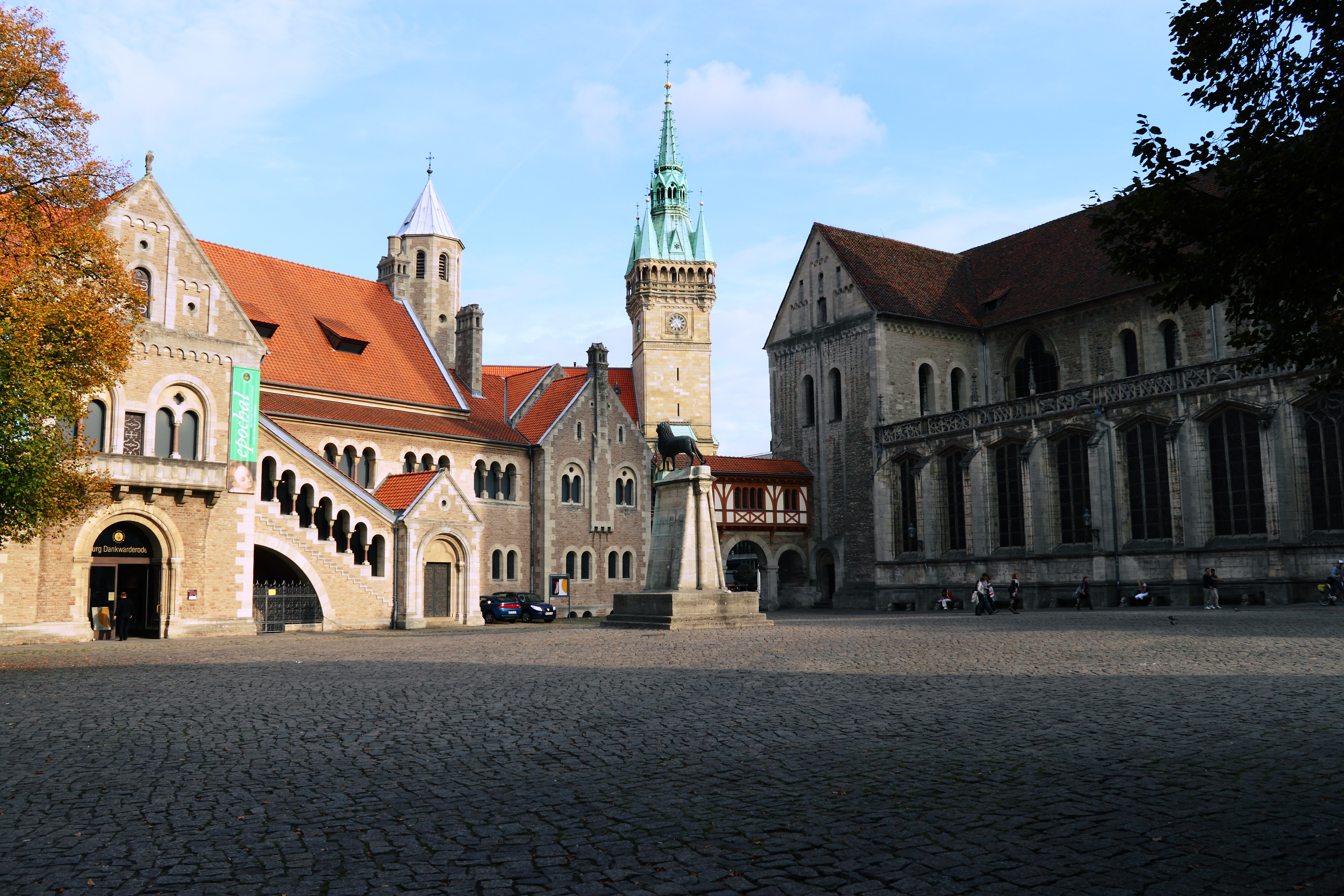
Burgplatz, with Castle, Cathedral, lion, and Town Hall

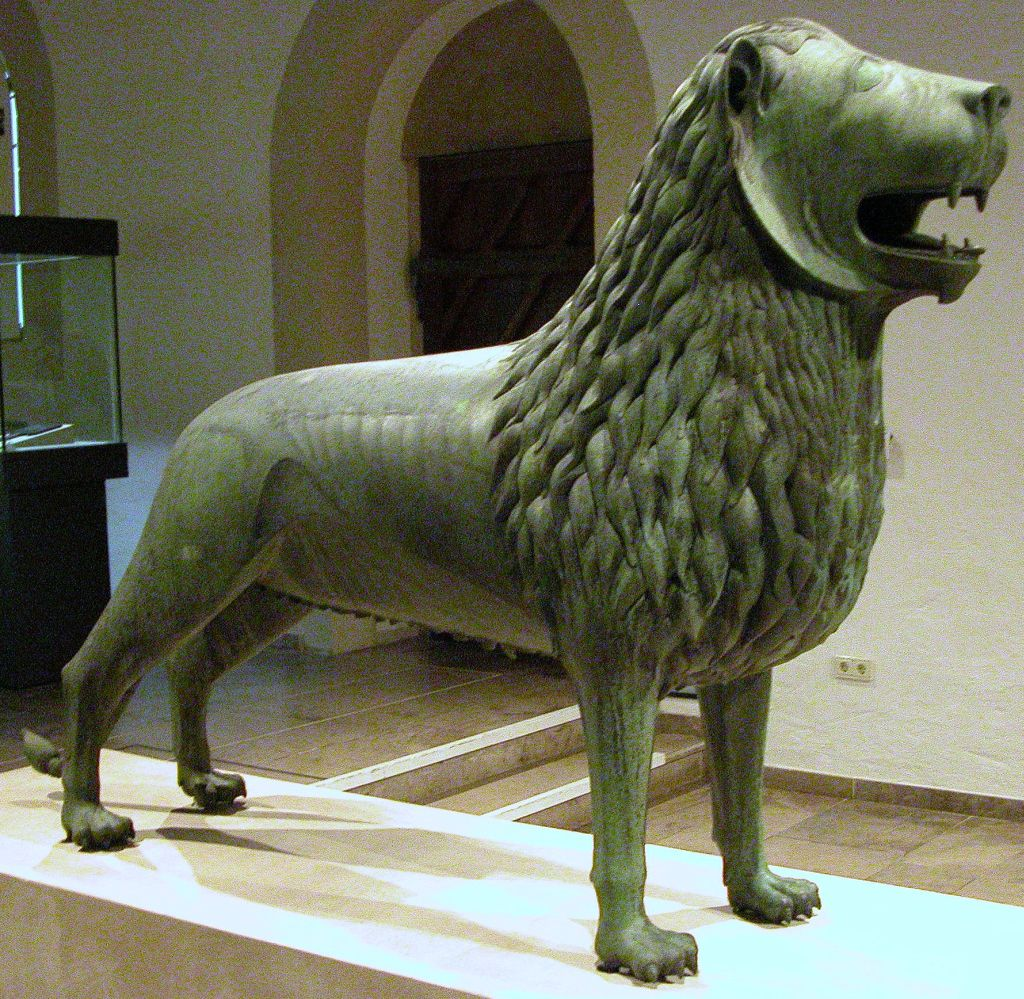
Brunswick Lion, original on display in castle museum

Town Hall

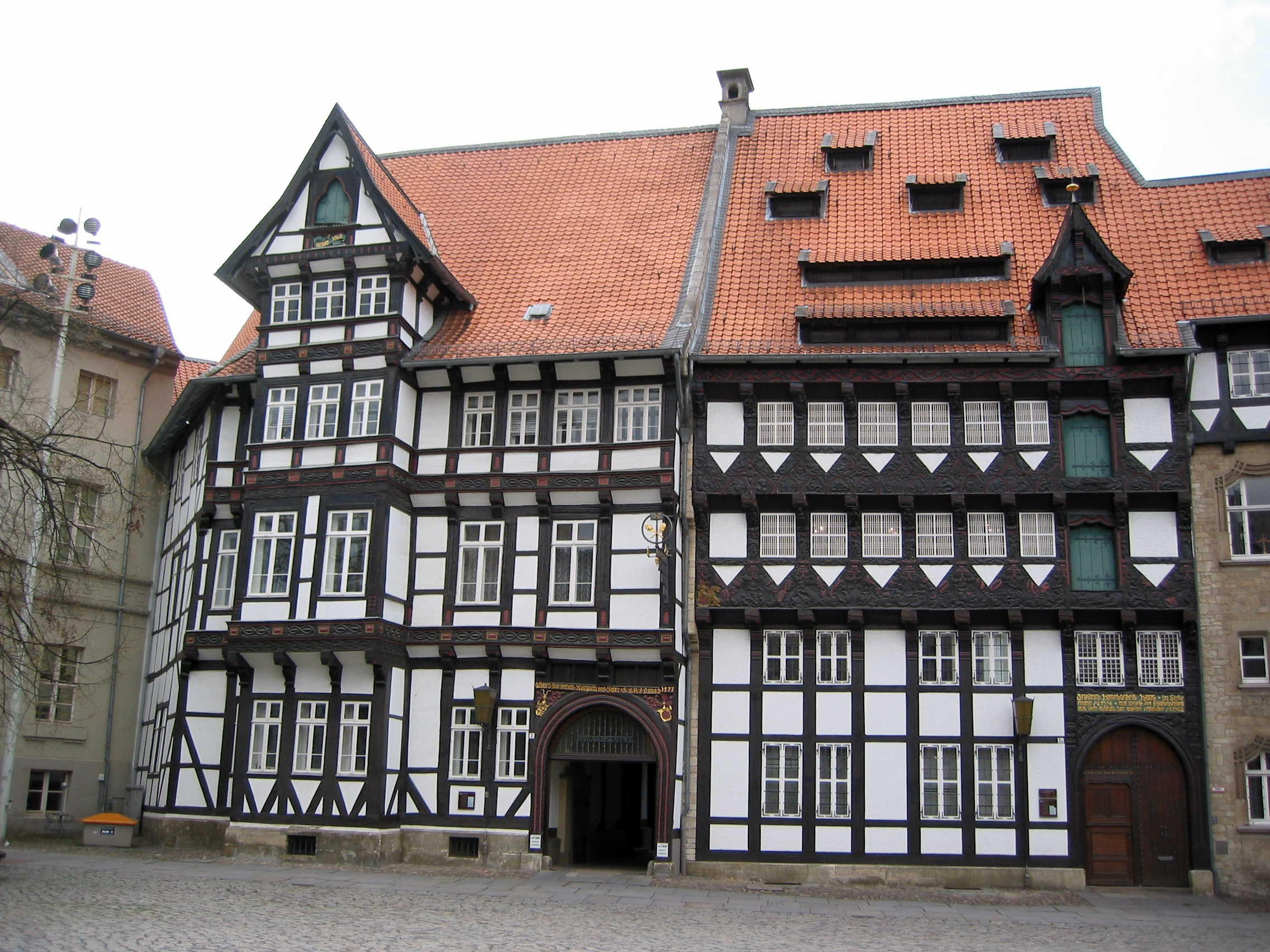
Veltheimsches Haus (left) and Gildehaus (right)

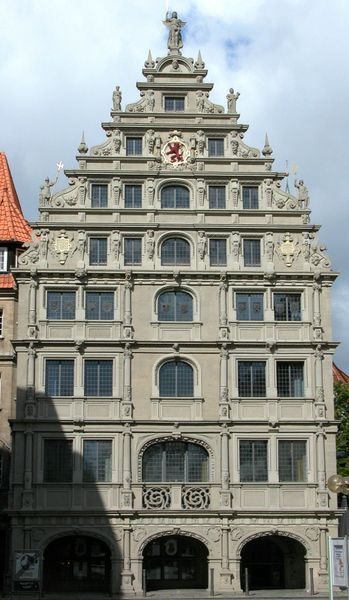
Gewandhaus

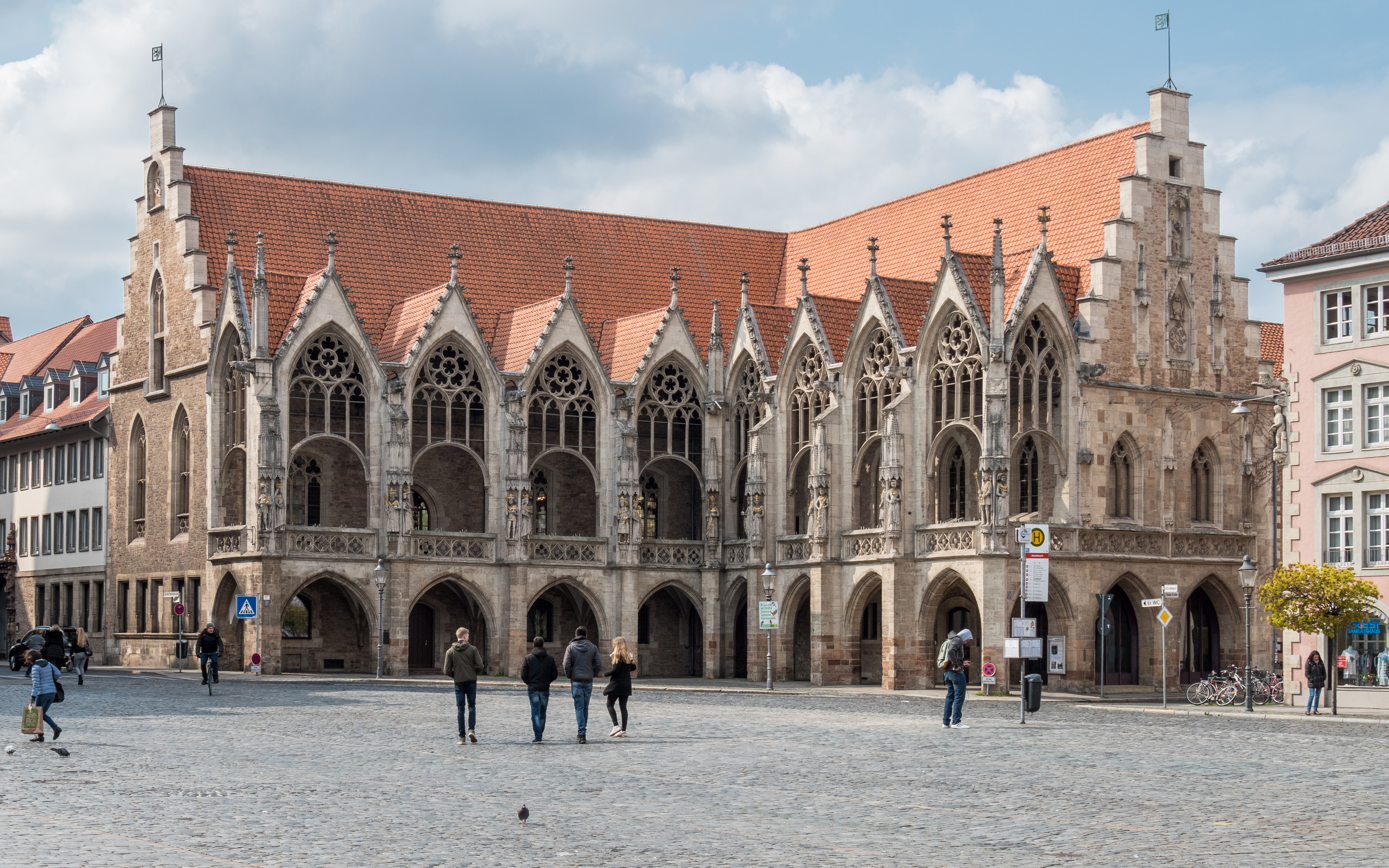
Old town hall

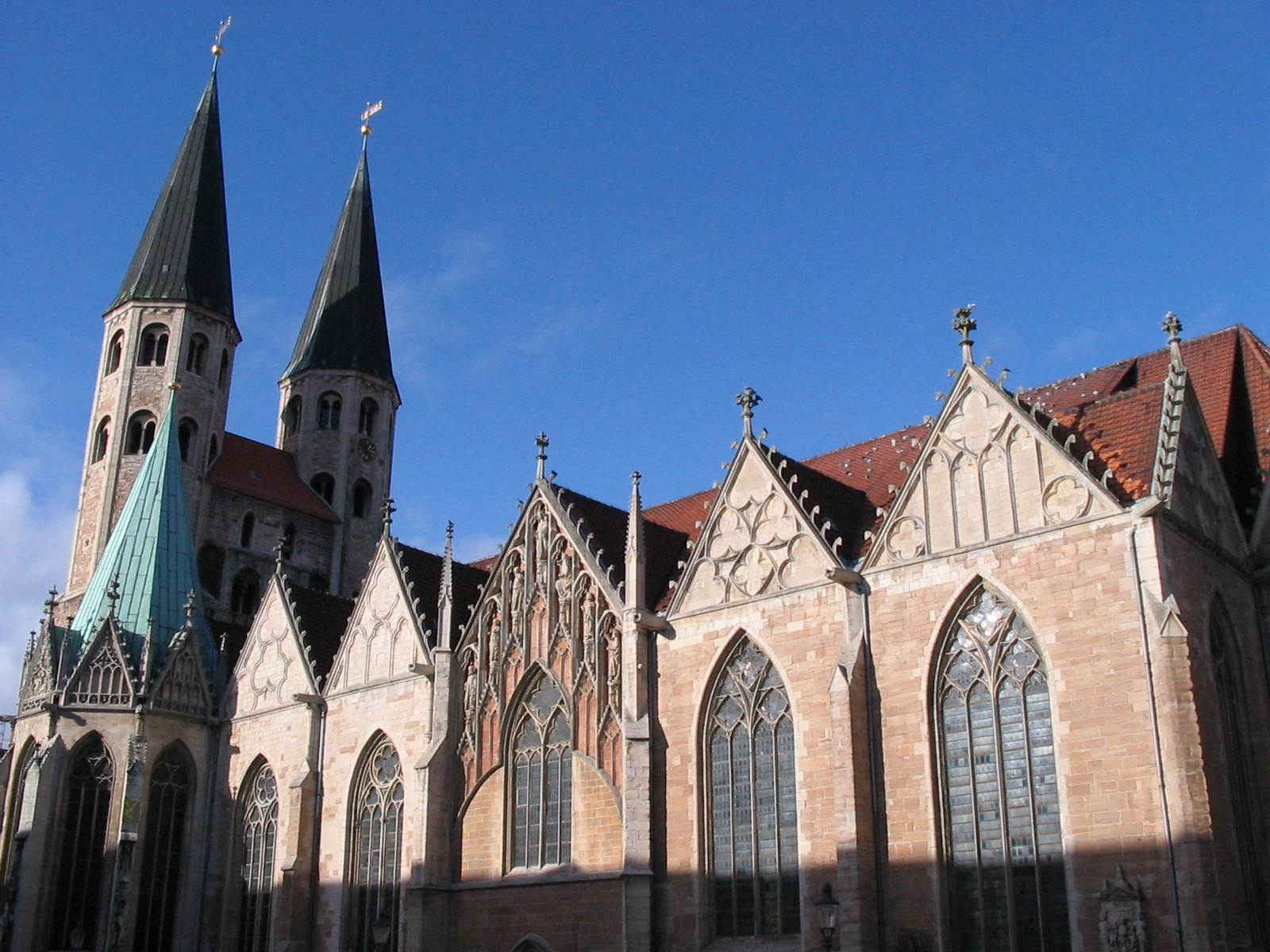
Church of St. Martin

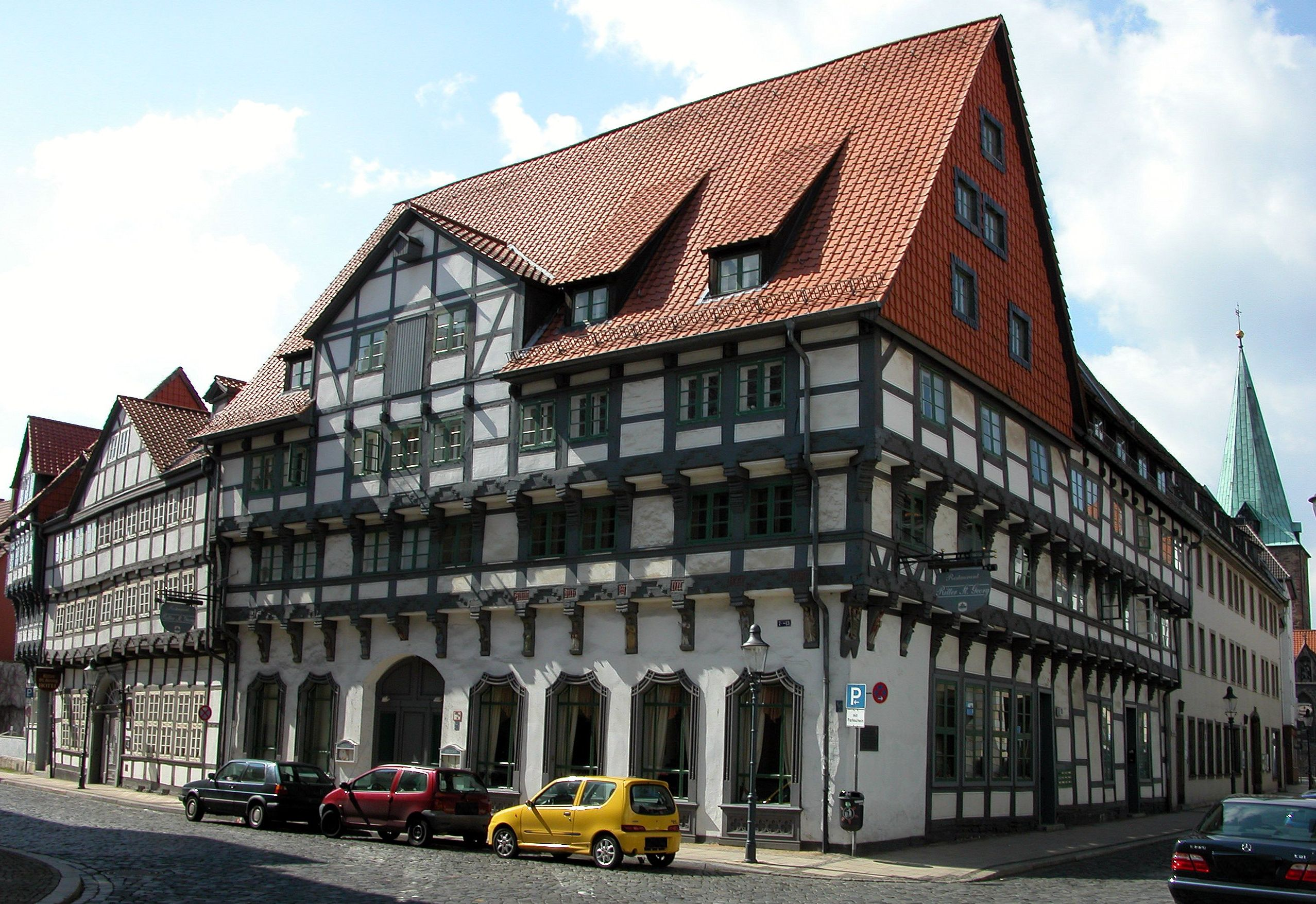
Altstadt ("Old Town")

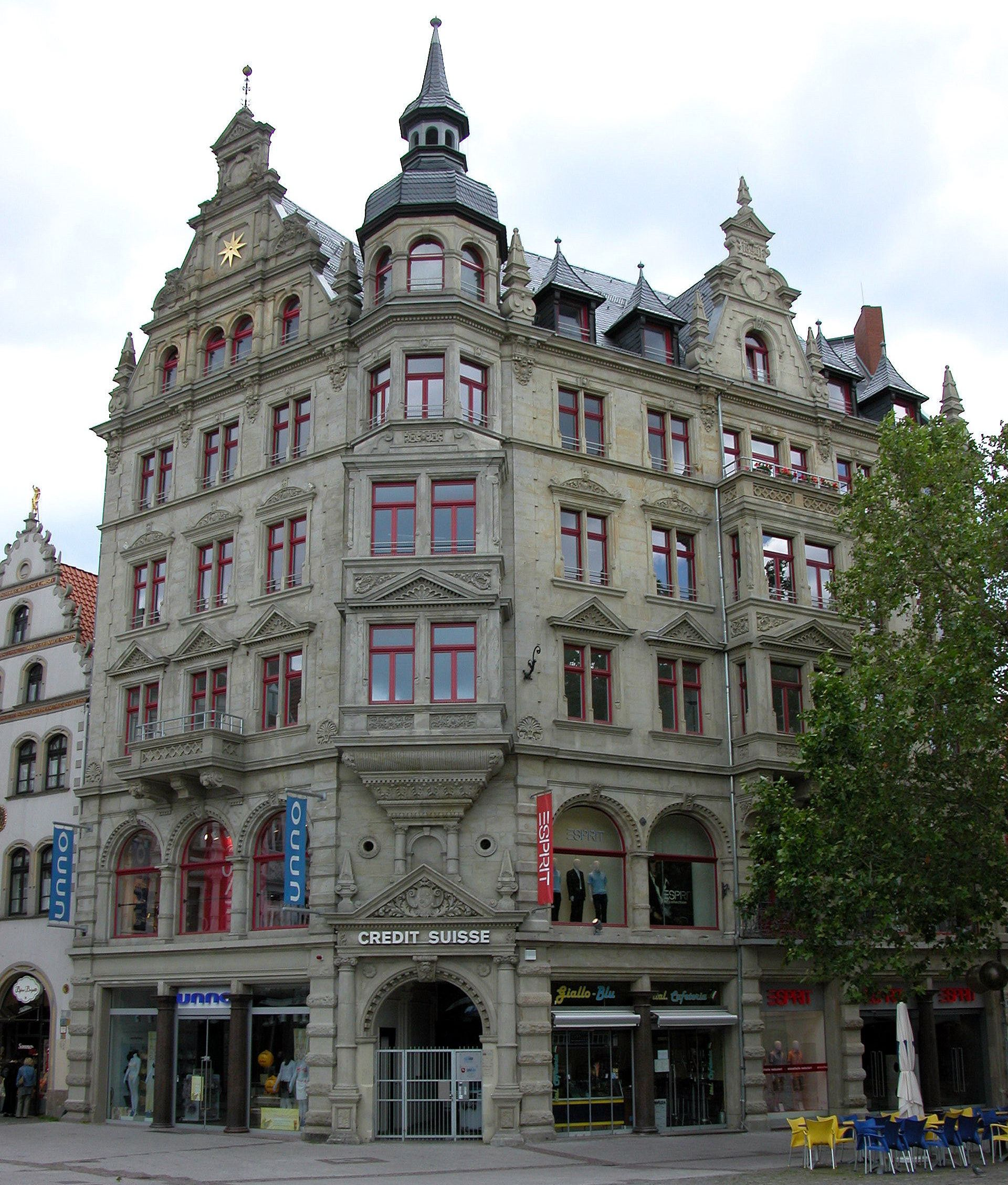
Haus zum Stern on Kohlmarkt

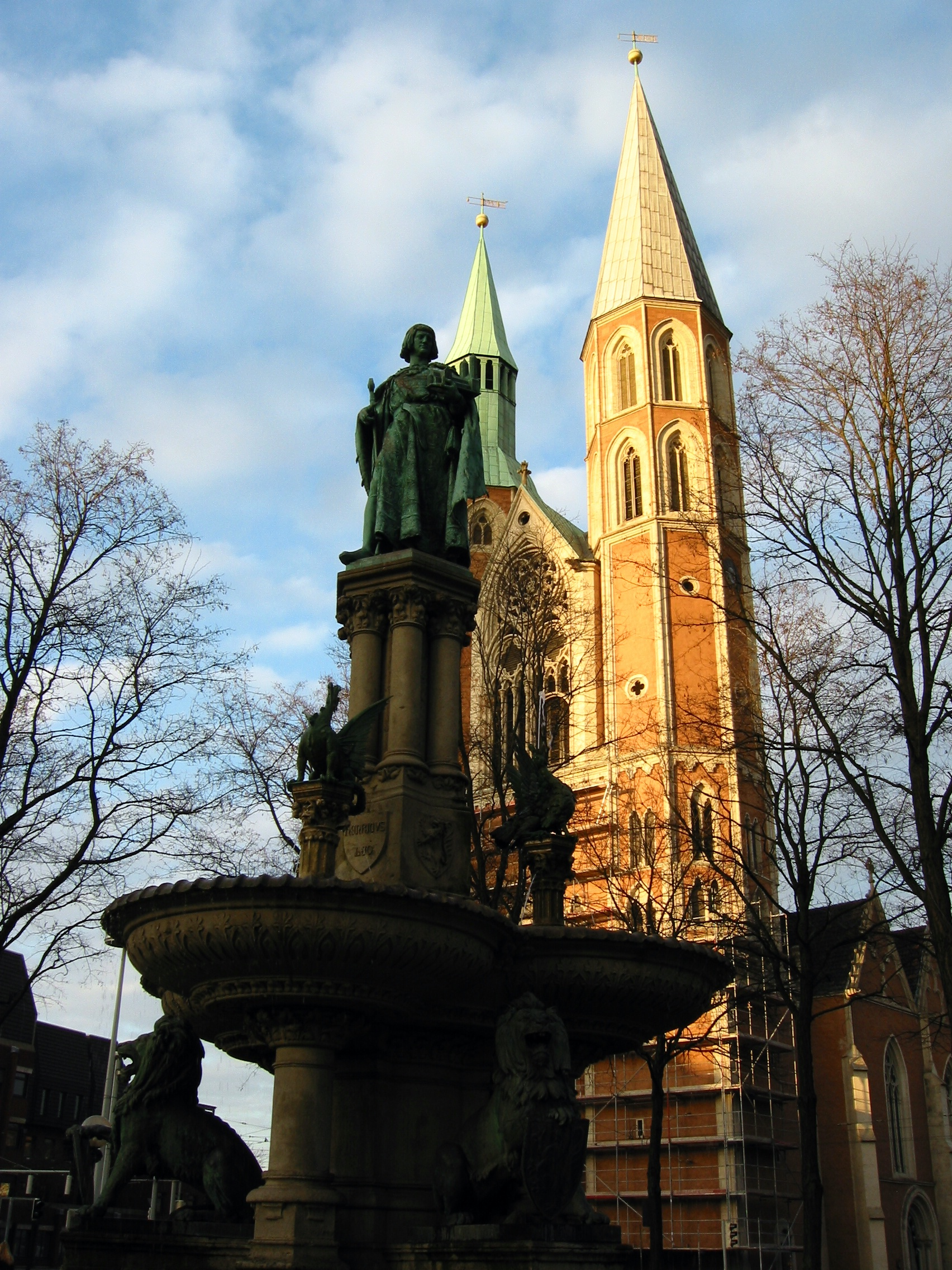
Church of St. Catherine and Henry the Lion's Fountain

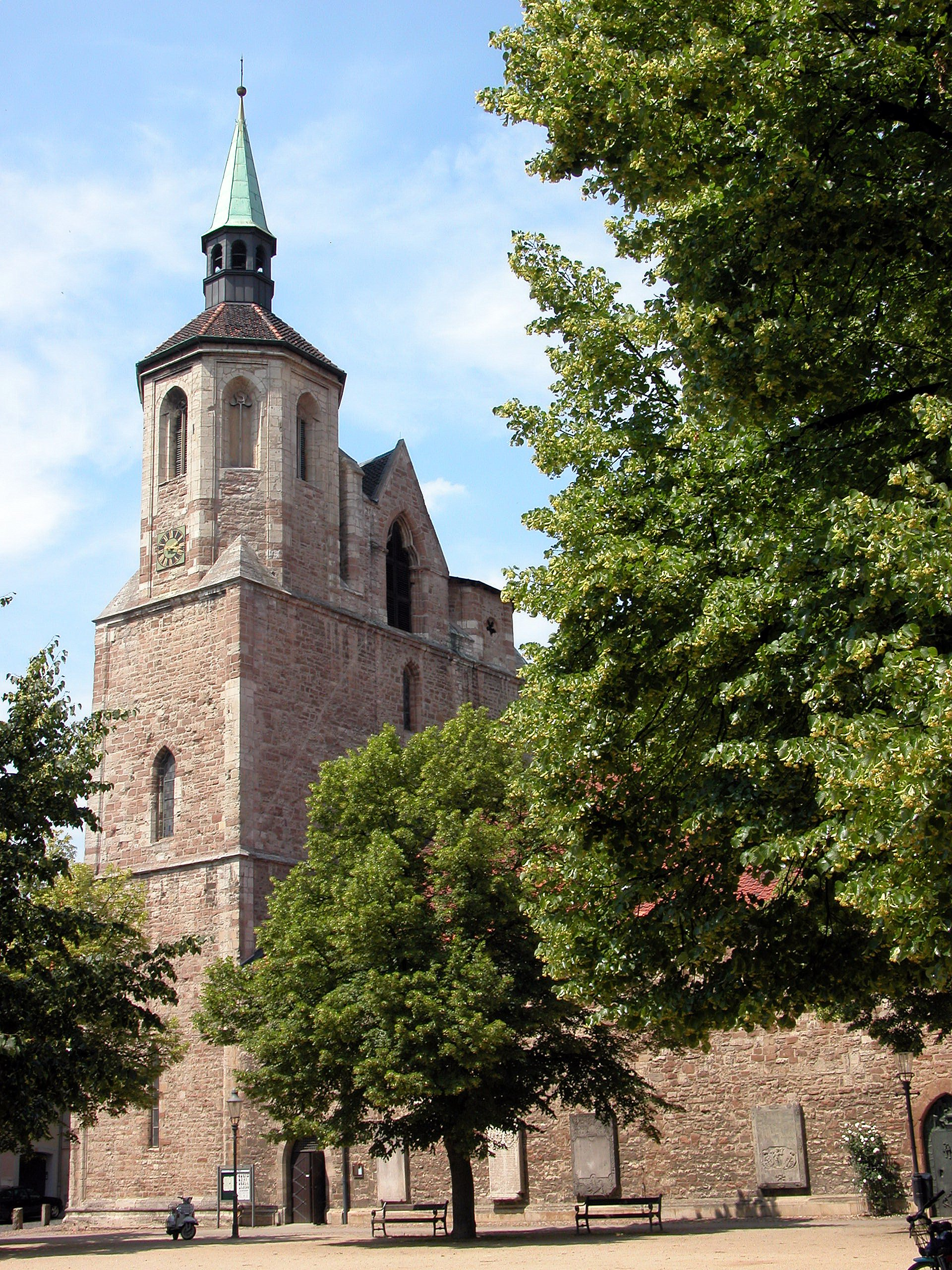
St. Magnus' Church

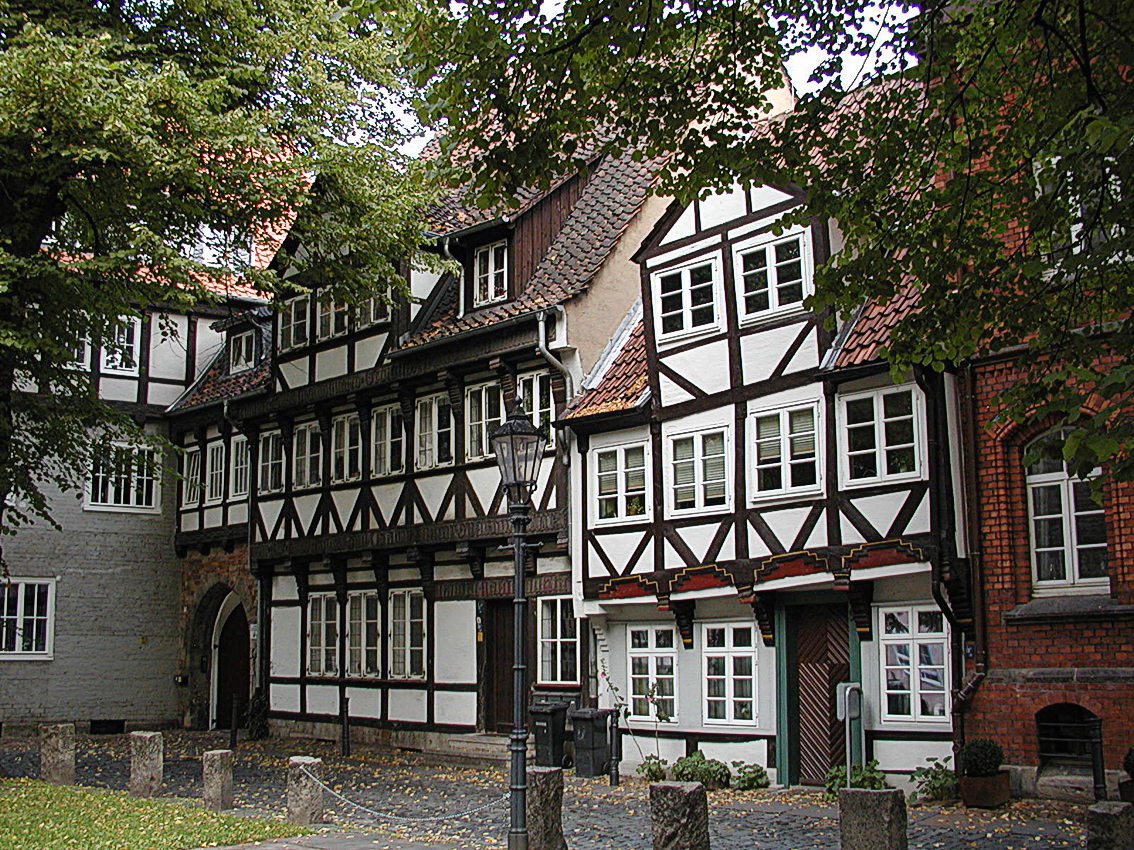
Magniviertel

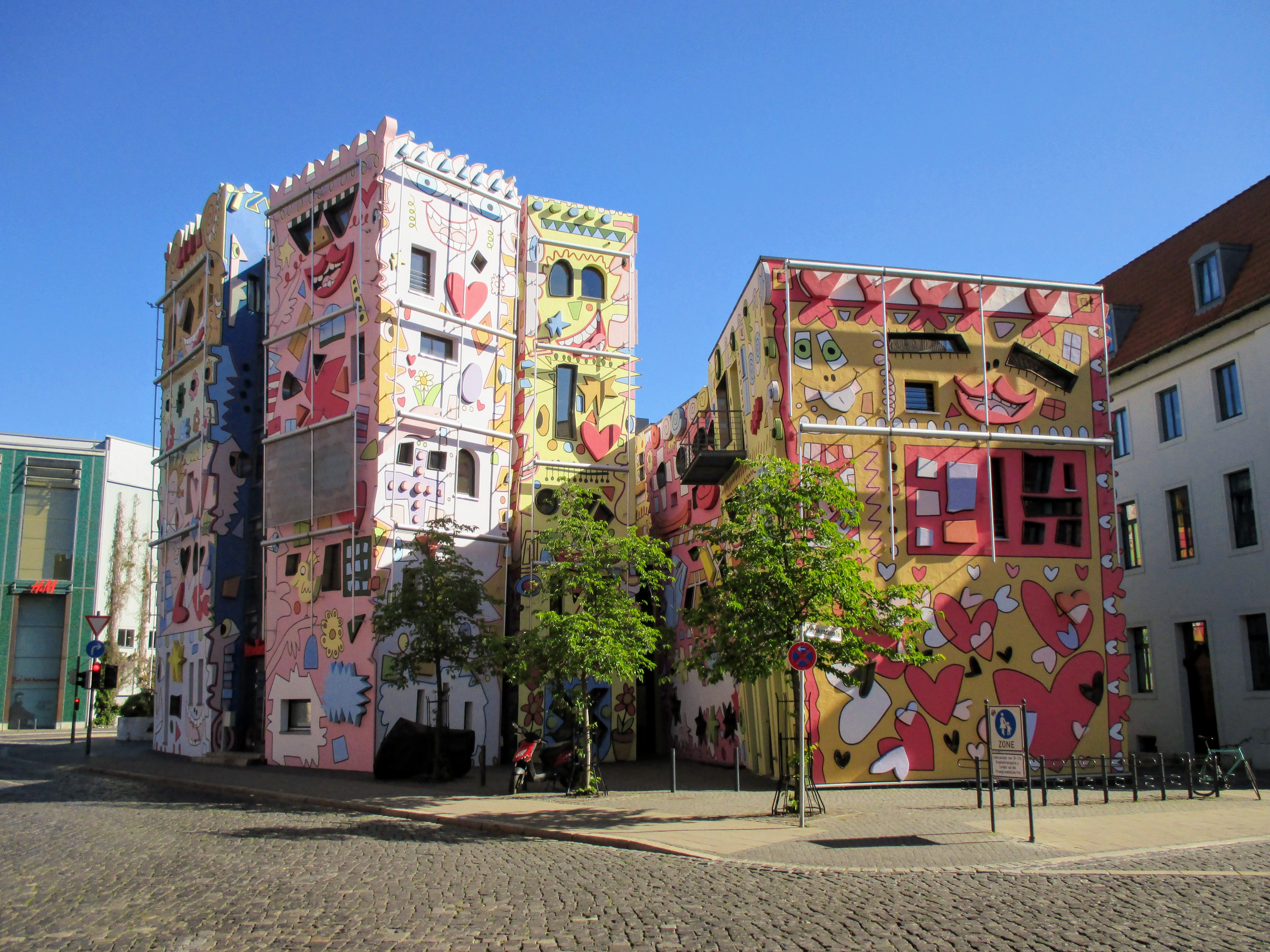
Happy Rizzi House

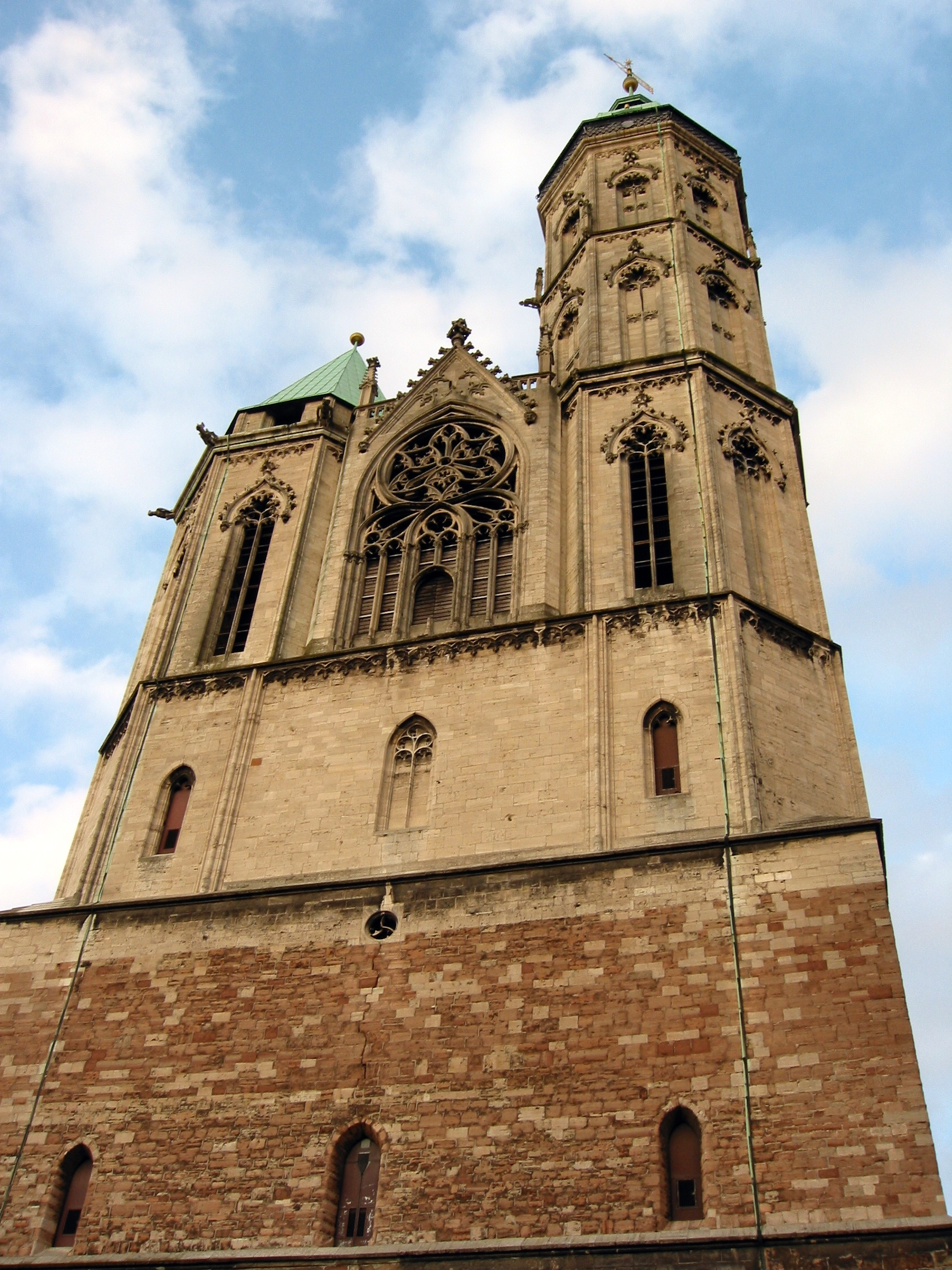
Andreaskirche

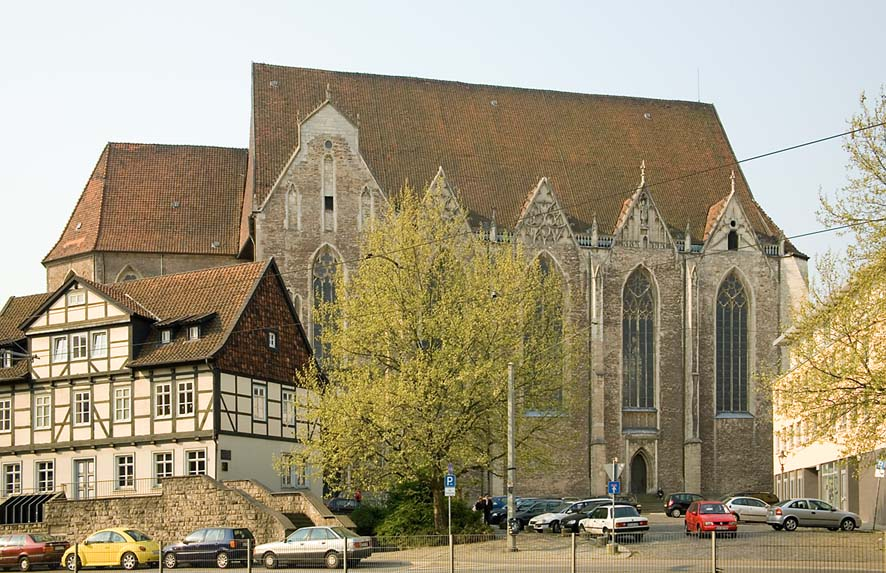
Church of St. Giles

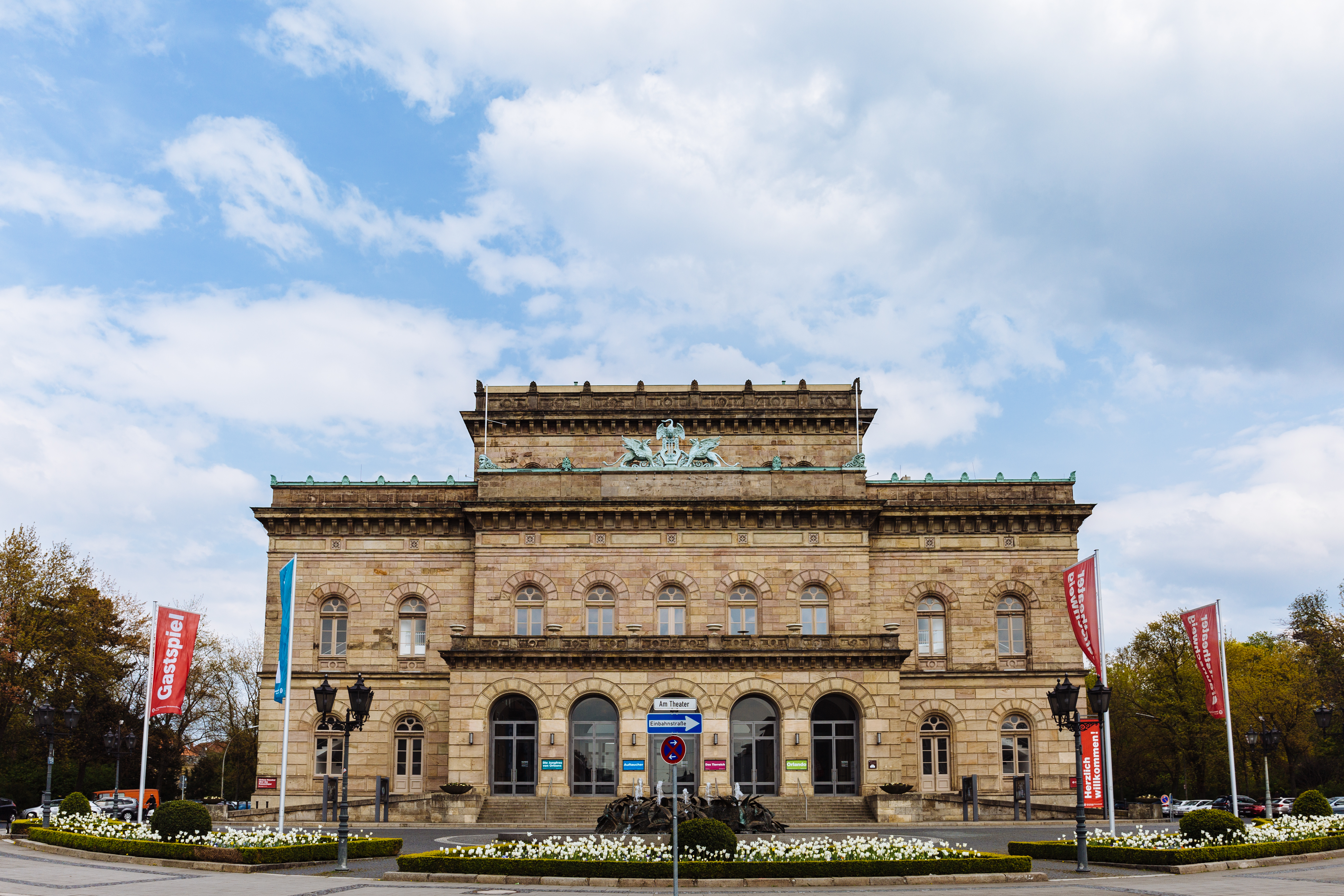
State Theatre

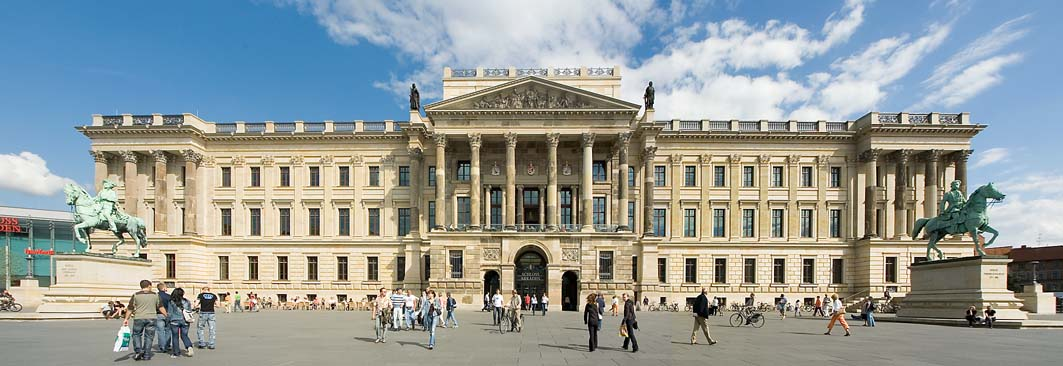
Rebuilt exterior of Brunswick Palace

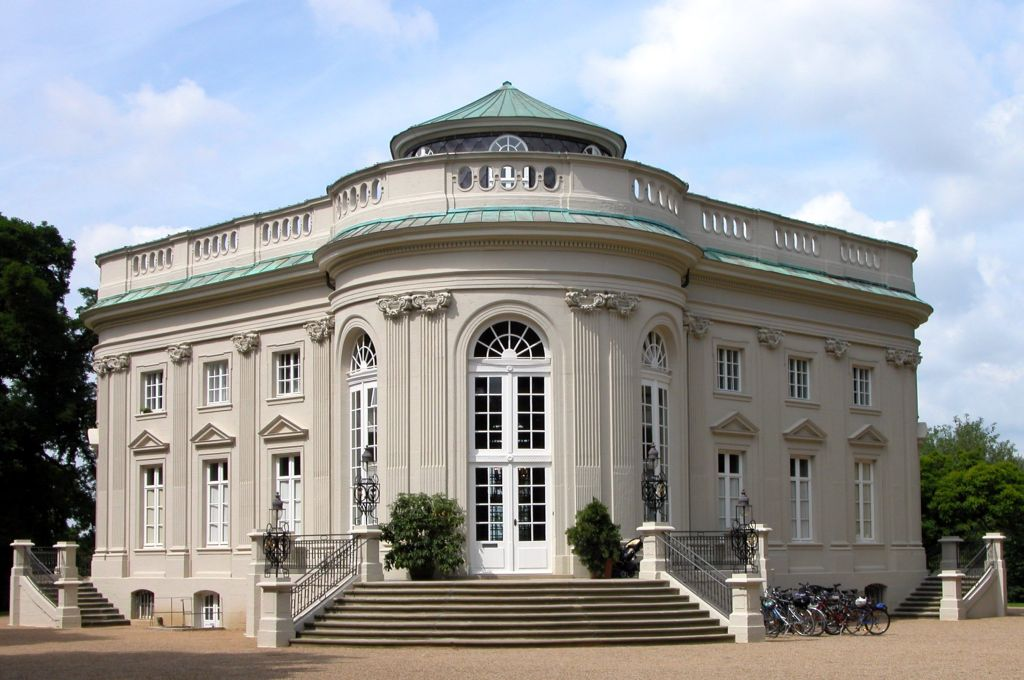
Schloss Richmond (Richmond Palace)

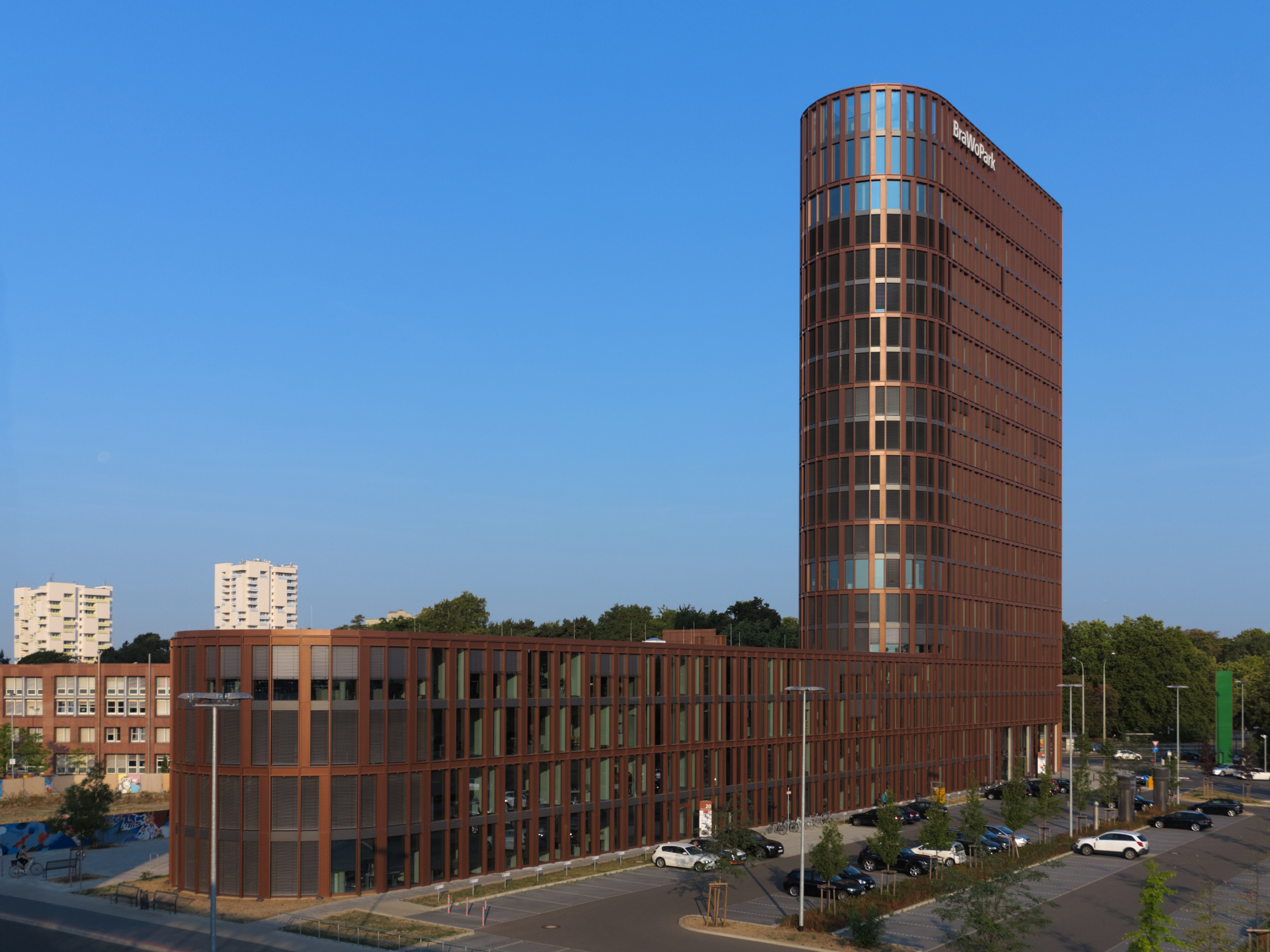
Building BraWoPark

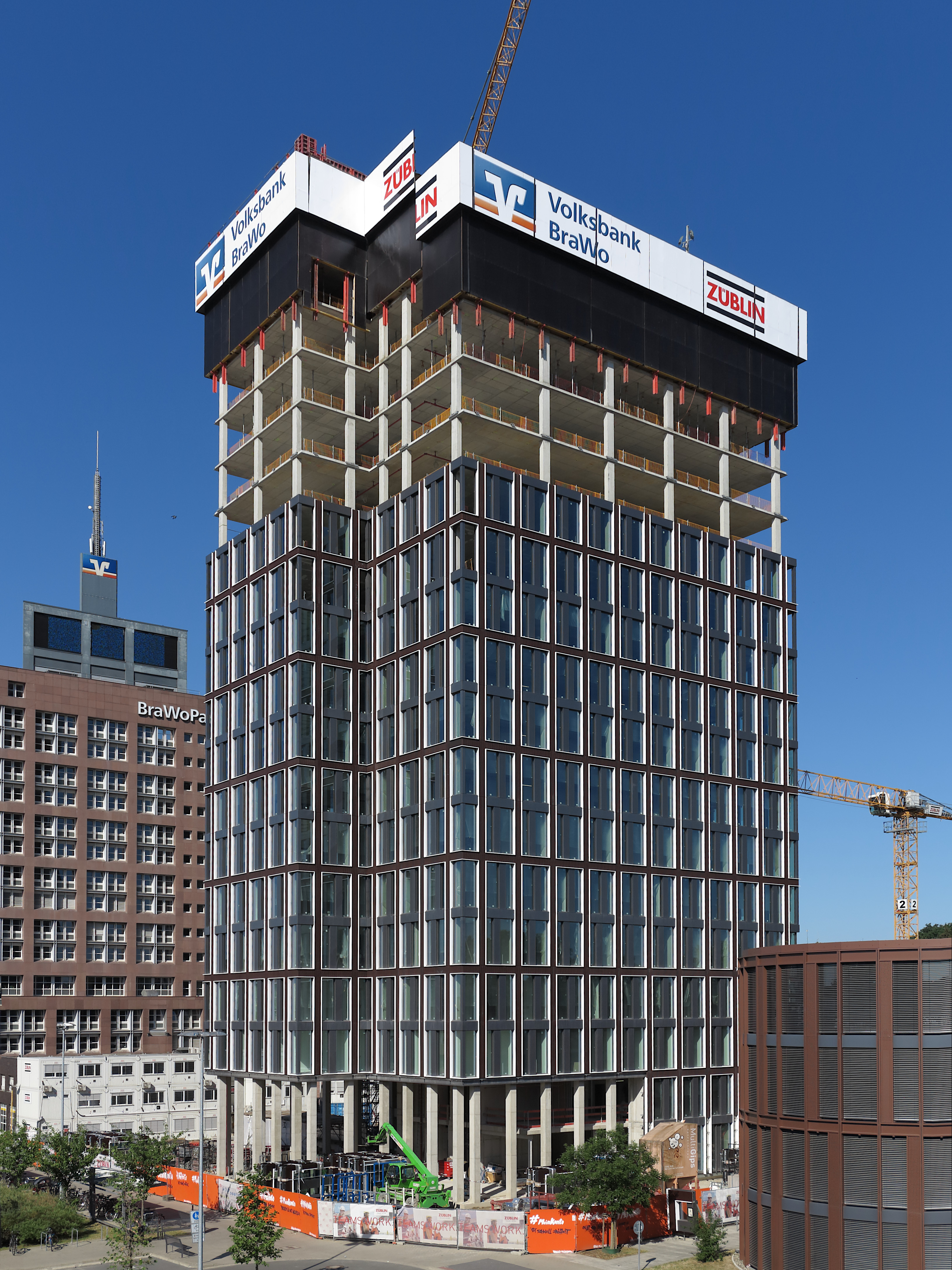
Business Center BraWoPark

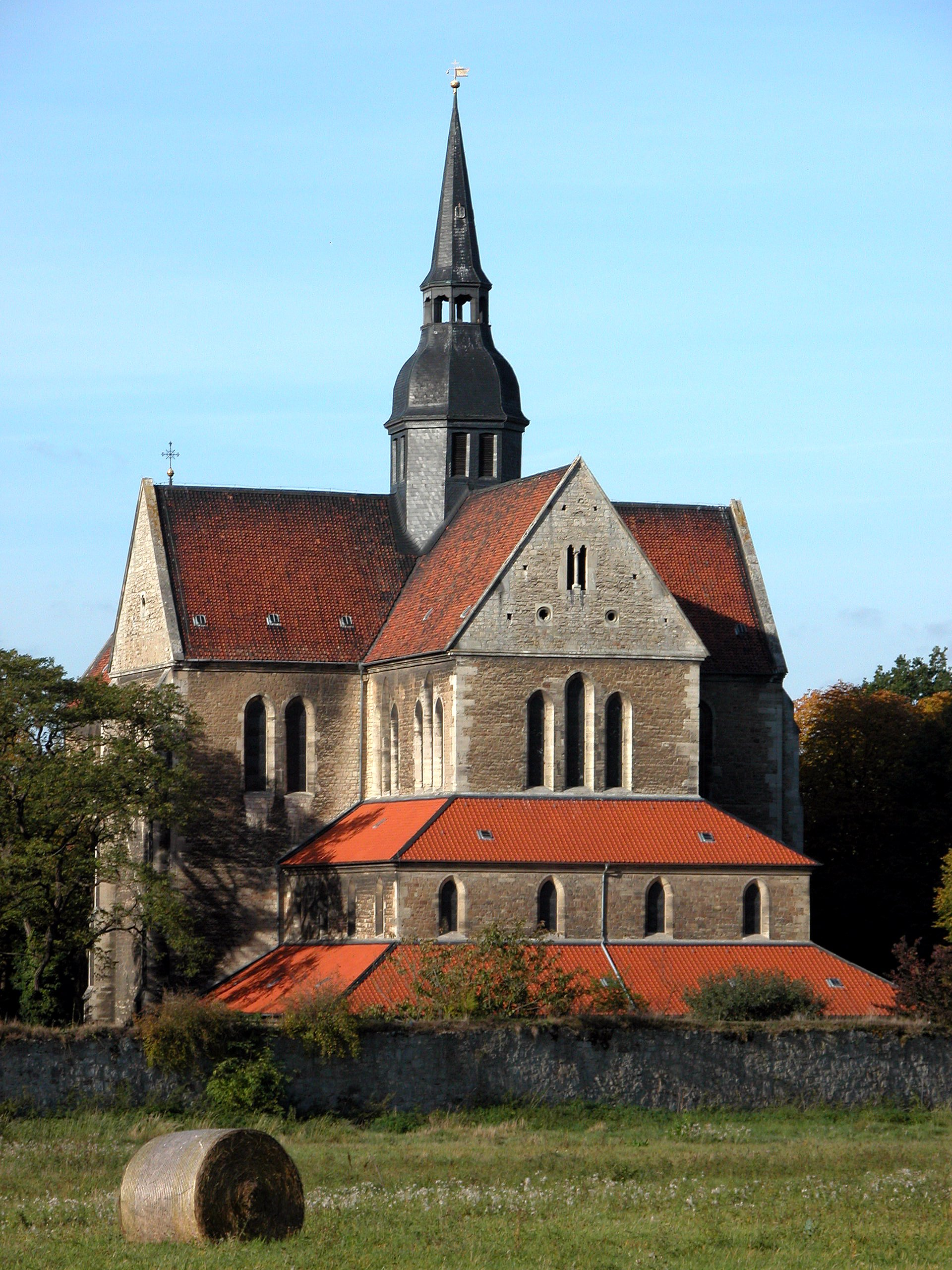
Riddagshausen Abbey

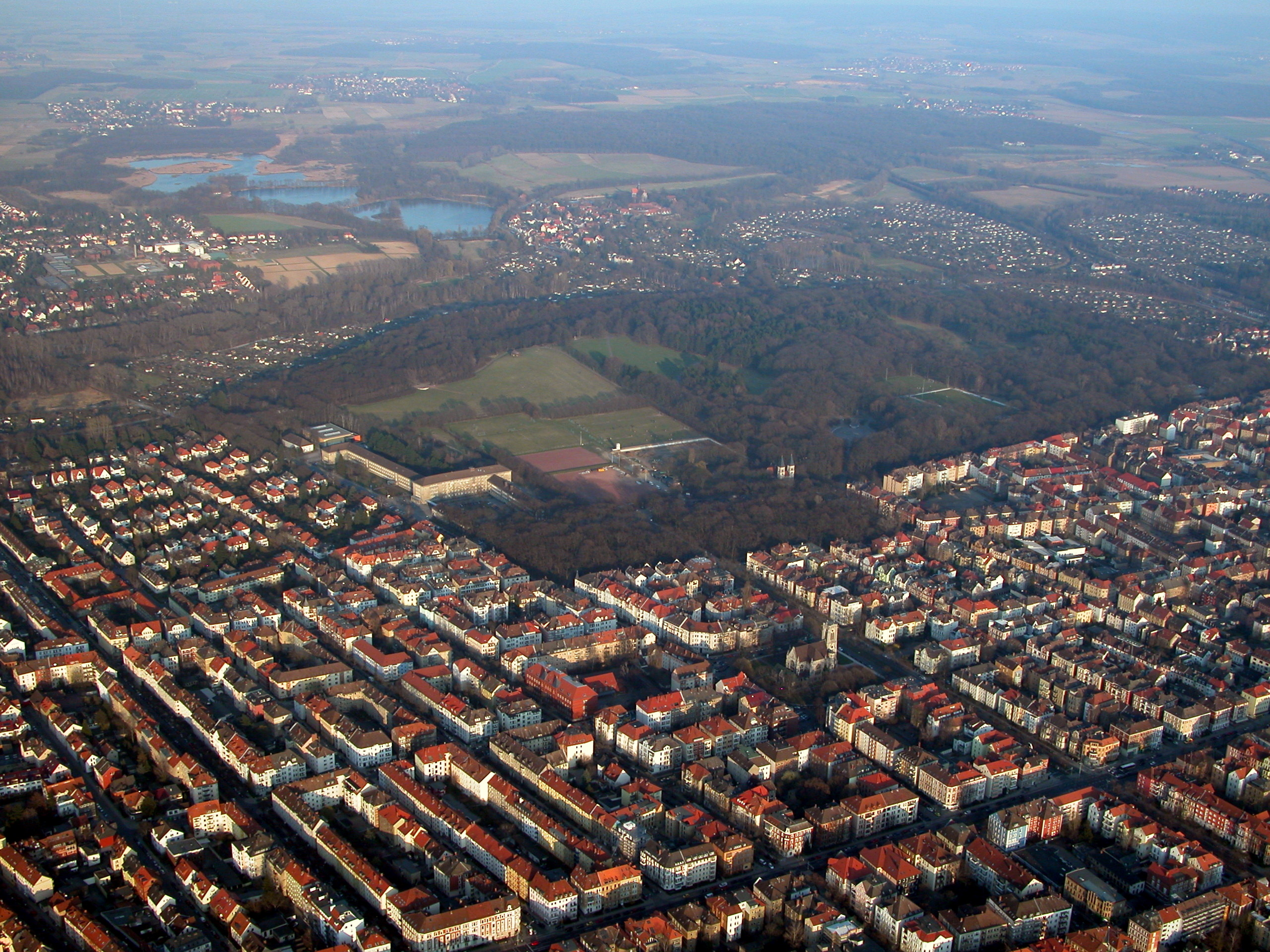
Östliches Ringgebiet

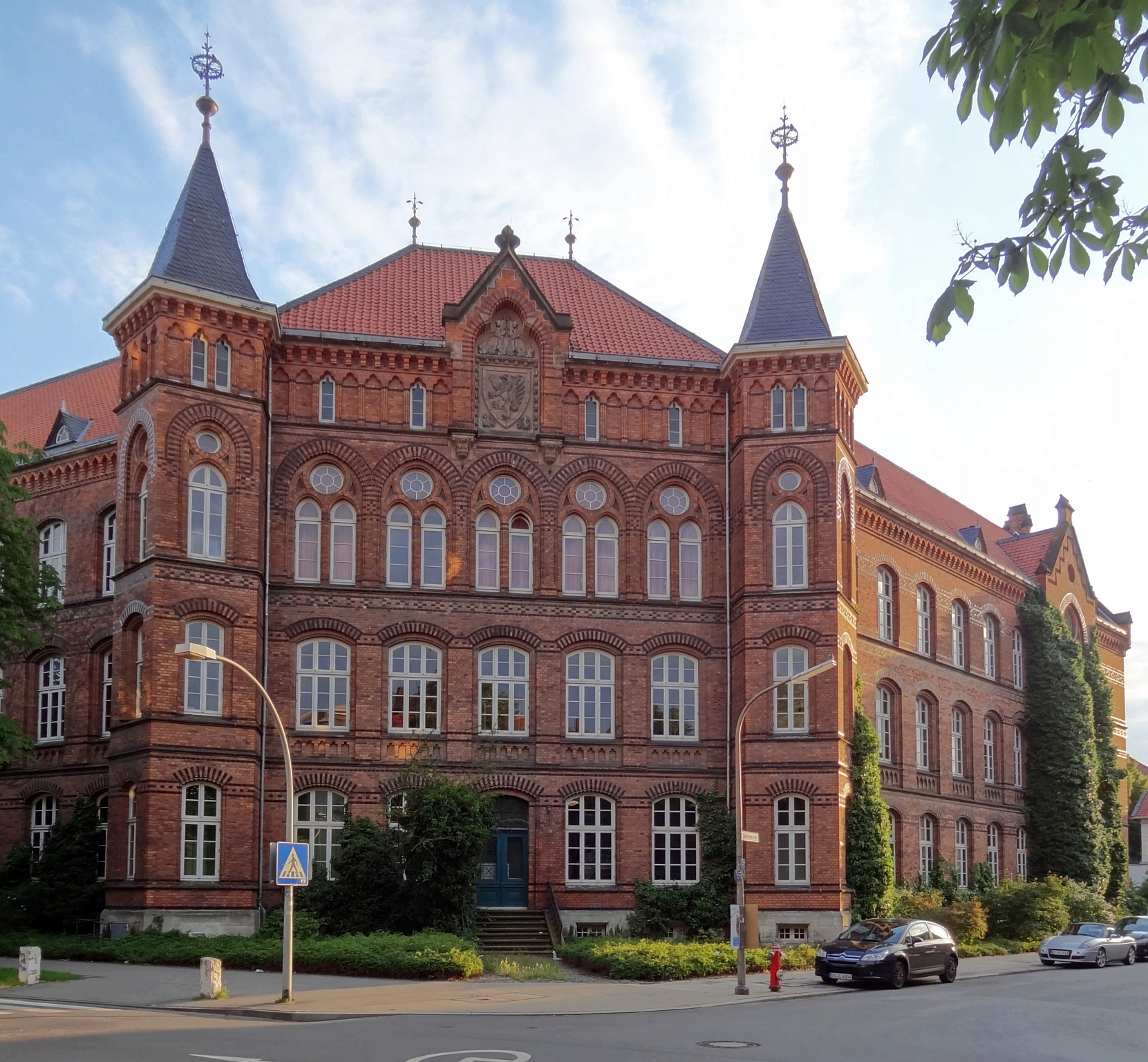
Nördliches Ringgebiet

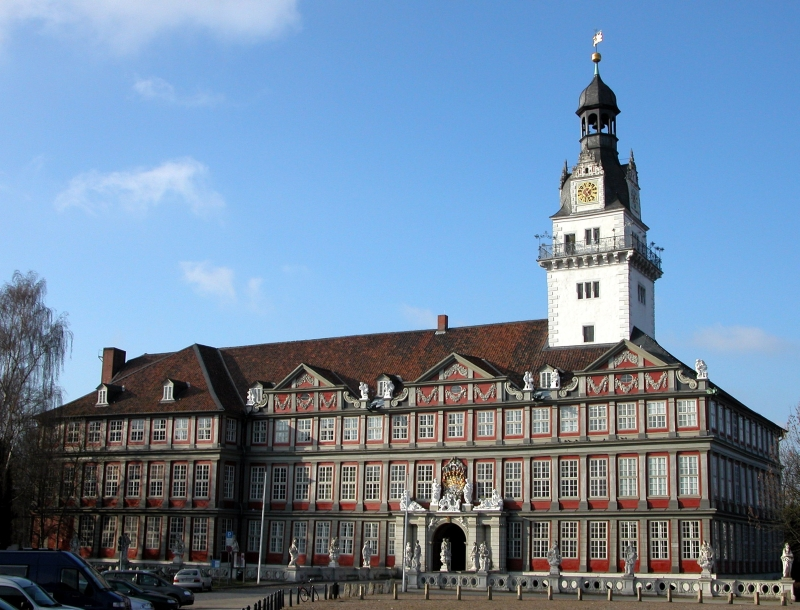
Wolfenbüttel Castle in nearby Wolfenbüttel with its around 1,000 timber-framed buildings

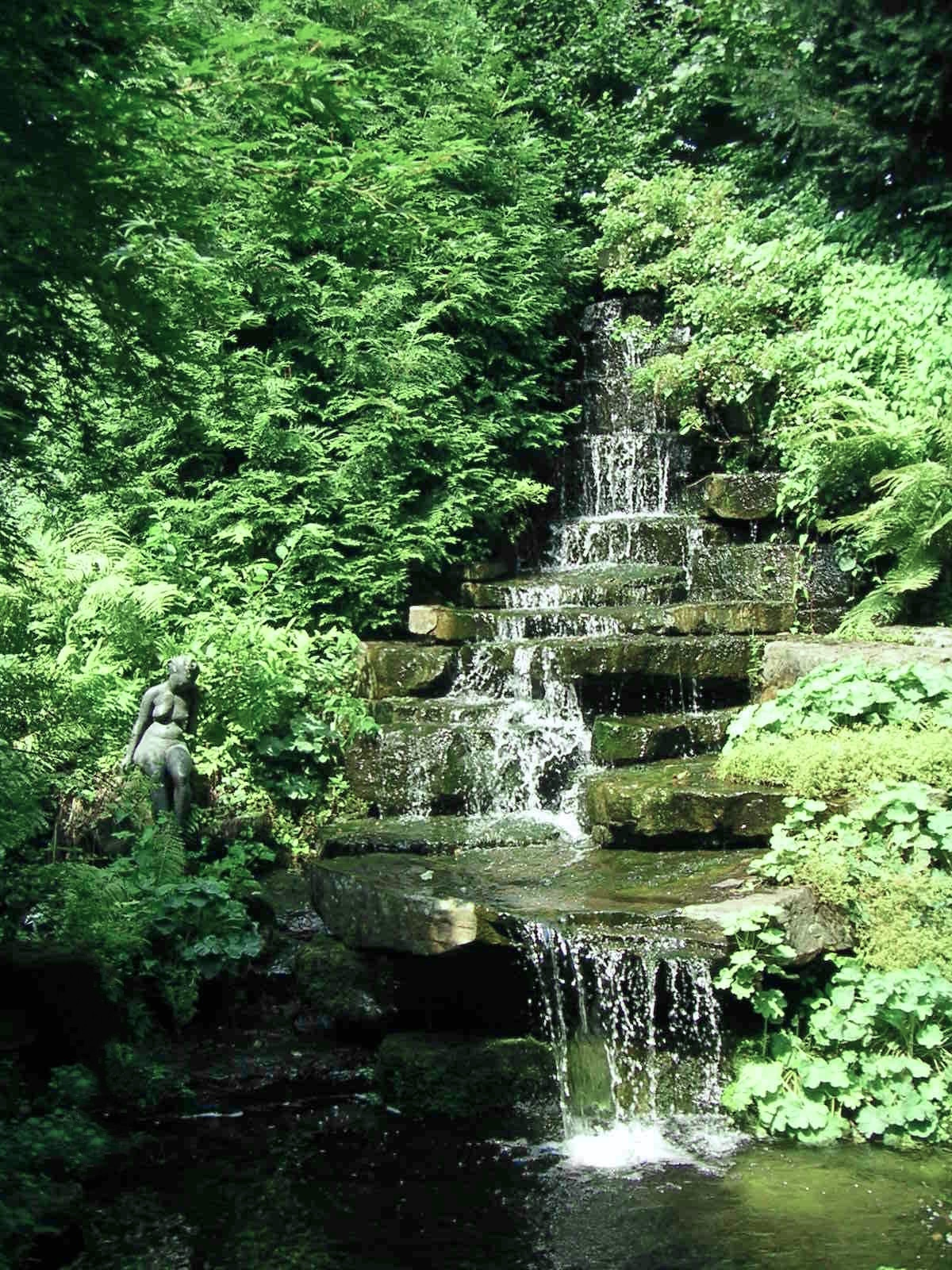
Botanischer Garten

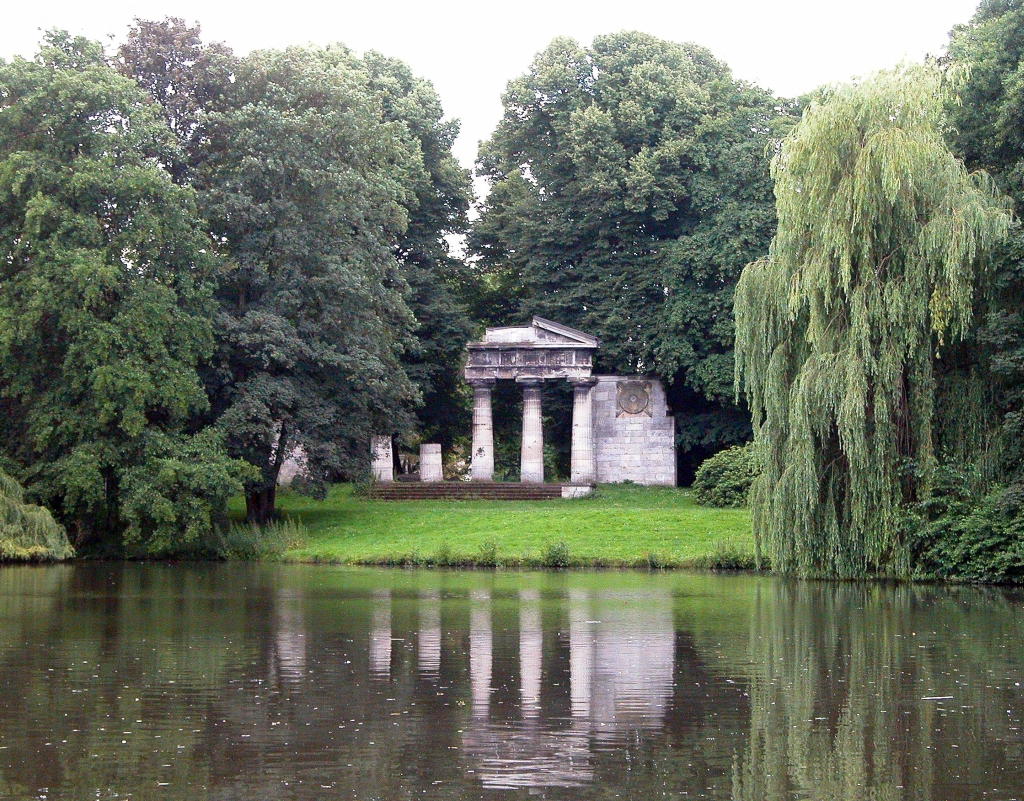
Bürgerpark

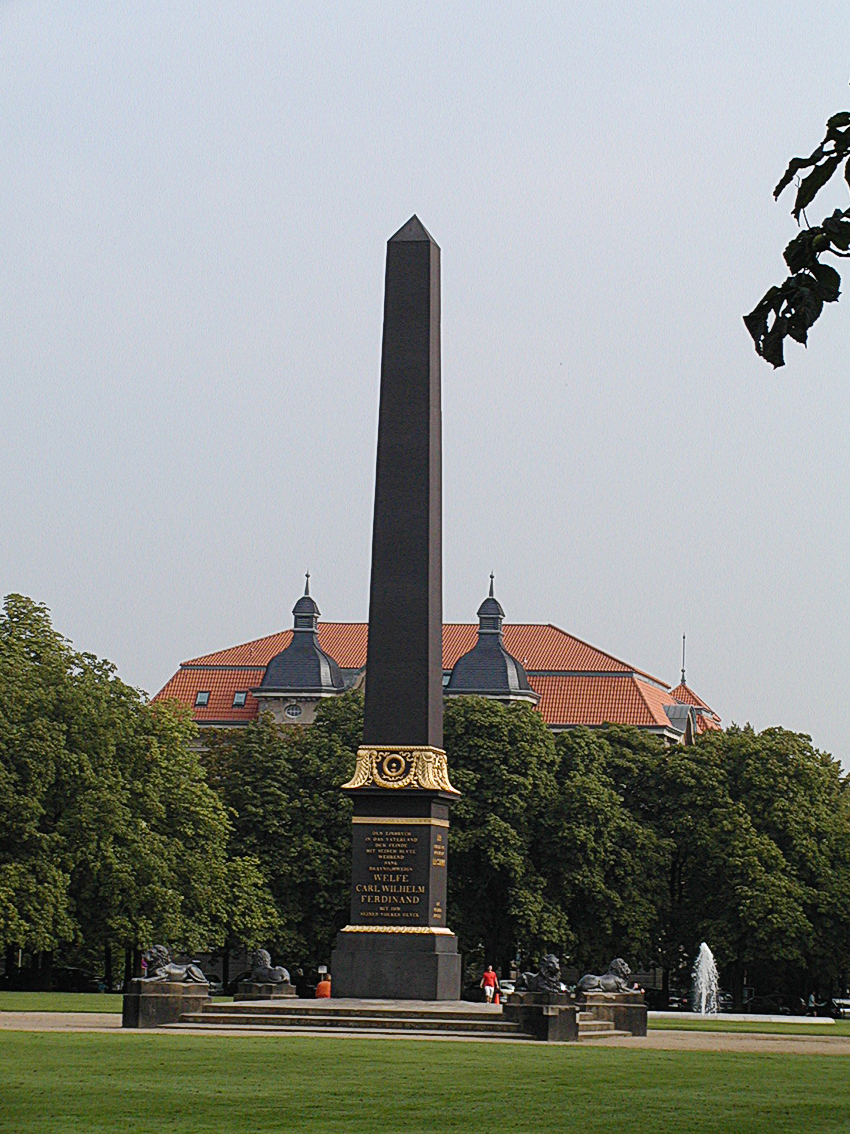
Löwenwall

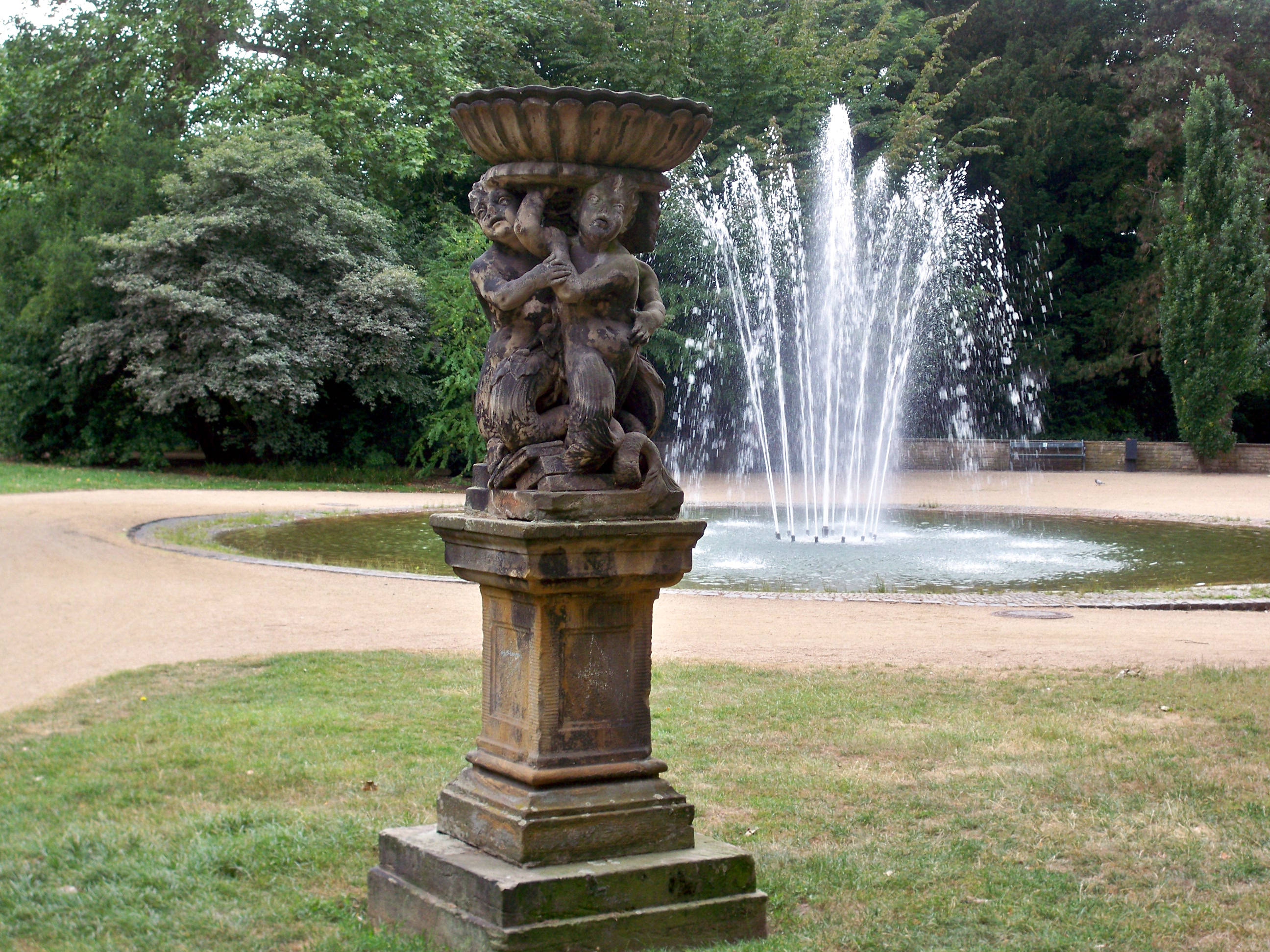
Inselwallpark

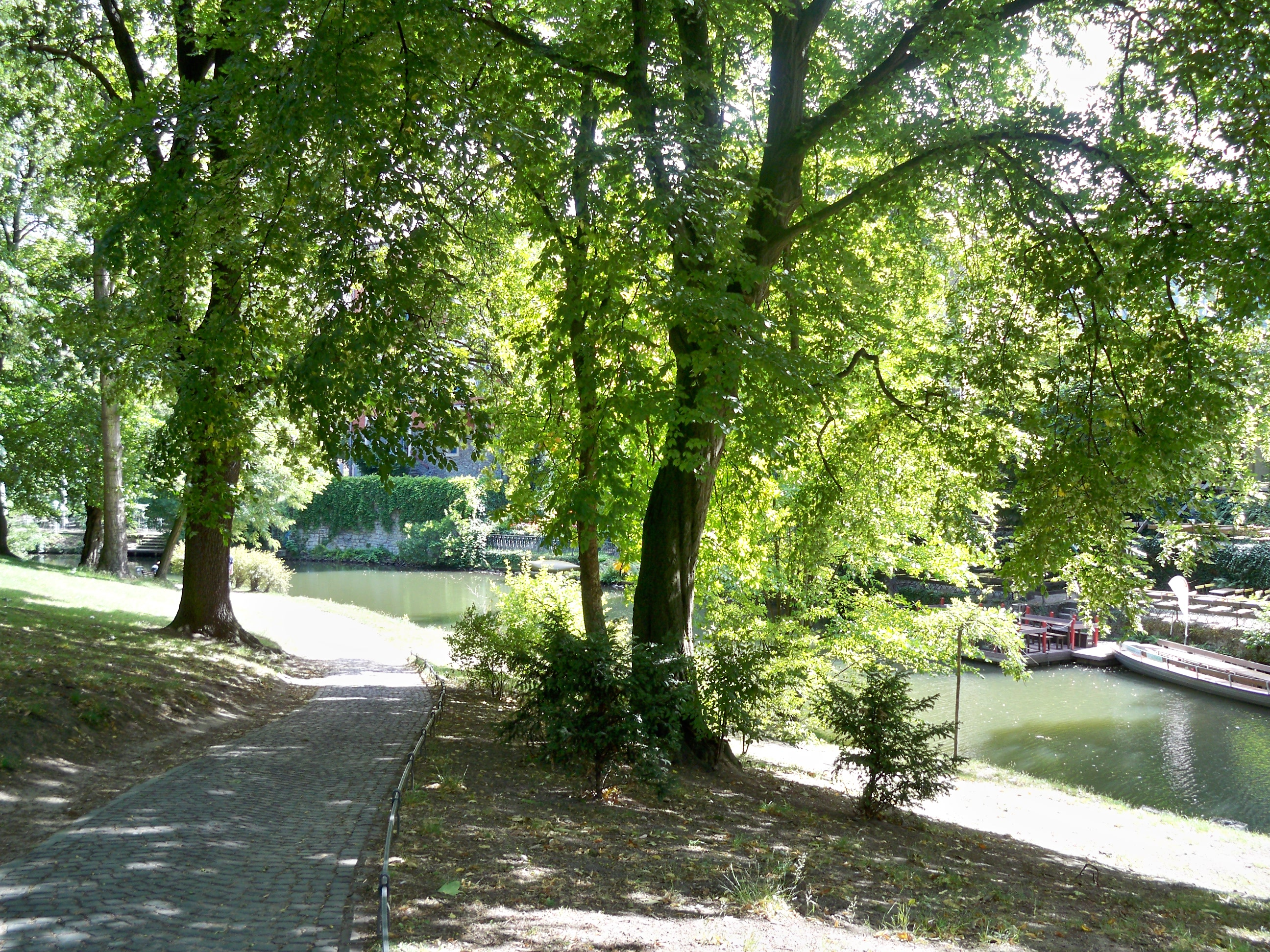
Museumpark

=== Parks and gardens ===
Parks and gardens in the city include the botanical garden Botanischer Garten der Technischen Universität Braunschweig, founded in 1840 by Johann Heinrich Blasius, the Bürgerpark, the Löwenwall with an obelisk from 1825, the Prinz-Albrecht-Park, and the Inselwallpark. Other parks and recreation areas are Stadtpark, Westpark, Theaterpark, Museumpark, Heidbergsee, Südsee, Ölpersee, the zoological garden Arche Noah Zoo Braunschweig and the nearby Essehof Zoo.

== Politics ==
=== Subdivisions ===
Braunschweig is made up of 19 boroughs (German: Stadtbezirke), which themselves may consist of several quarters (German: Stadtteile) each. The 19 boroughs, with their official numbers, are:

- 112: Wabe-Schunter-Beberbach (Note: Formed in 2011 out of the former boroughs of Wabe-Schunter and Bienrode-Waggum-Bevenrode.)
- 113: Hondelage
- 114: Volkmarode
- 120: Östliches Ringgebiet
- 131: Innenstadt
- 132: Viewegsgarten-Bebelhof
- 211: Stöckheim-Leiferde
- 212: Heidberg-Melverode
- 213: Südstadt-Rautheim-Mascherode
- 221: Weststadt
- 222: Timmerlah-Geitelde-Stiddien
- 223: Broitzem
- 224: Rüningen
- 310: Westliches Ringgebiet
- 321: Lehndorf-Watenbüttel
- 322: Veltenhof-Rühme
- 323: Wenden-Thune-Harxbüttel
- 331: Nordstadt
- 332: Schunteraue
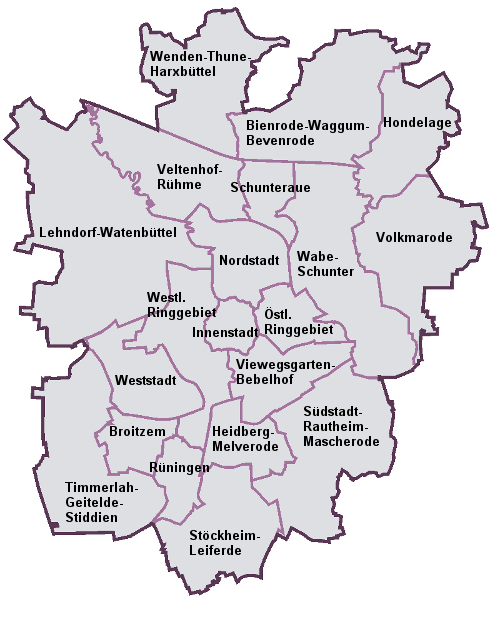
Boroughs of Braunschweig

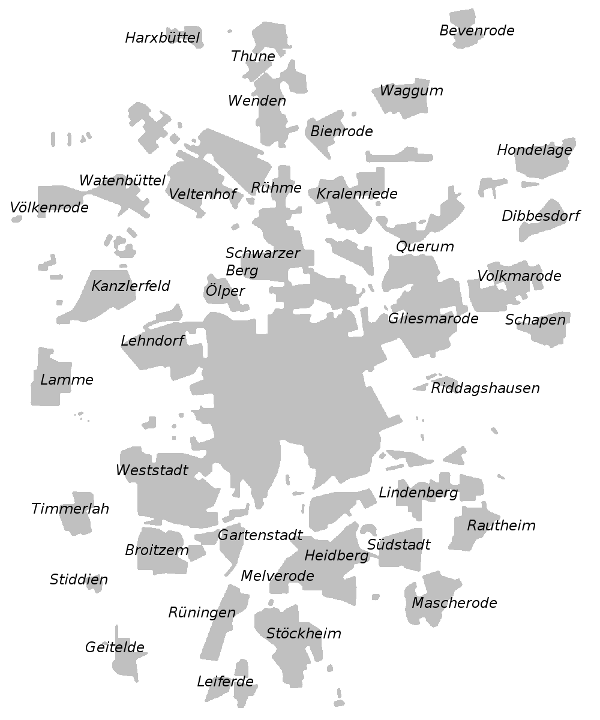
Stadtteile of Braunschweig

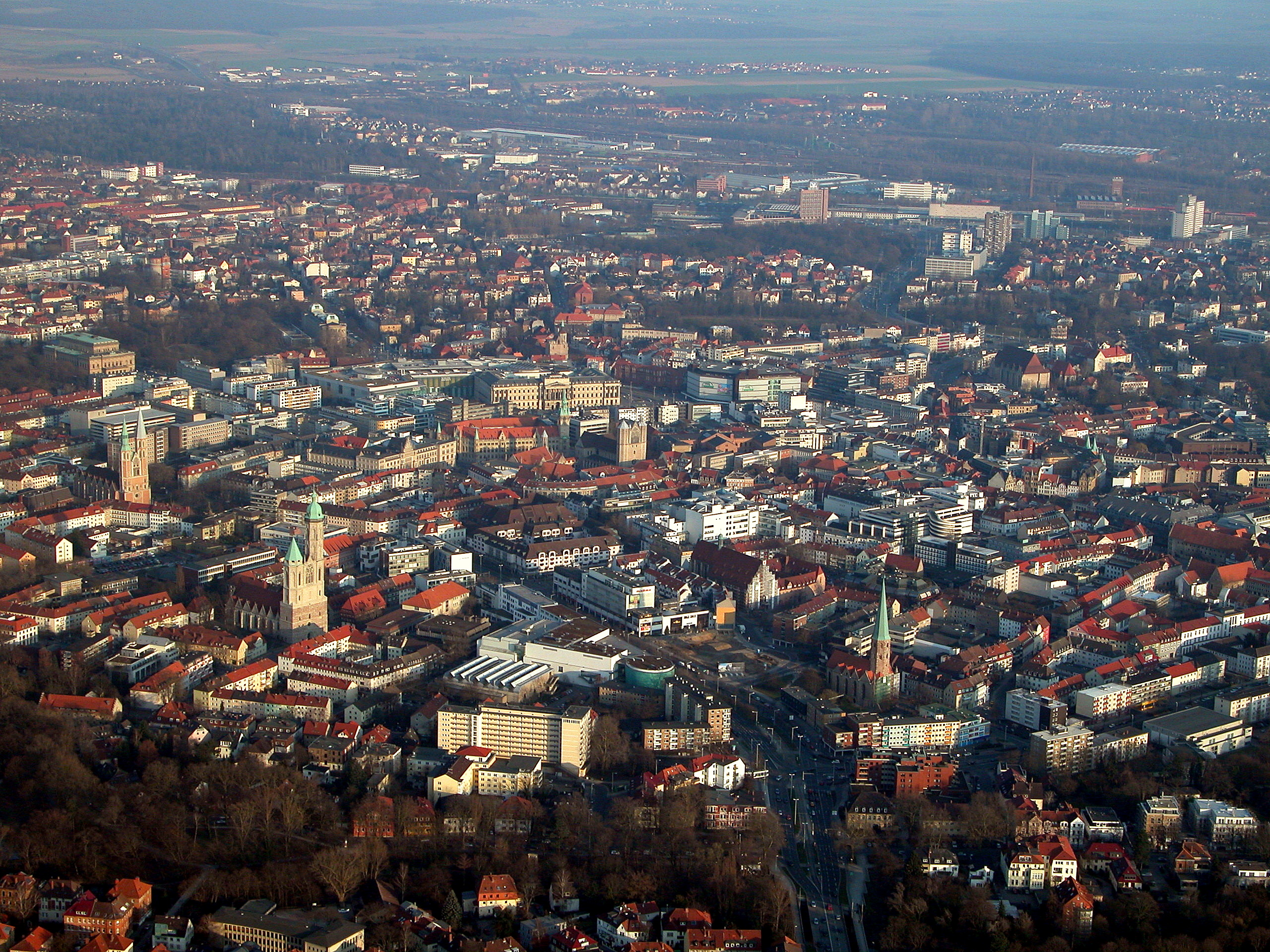
Innenstadt

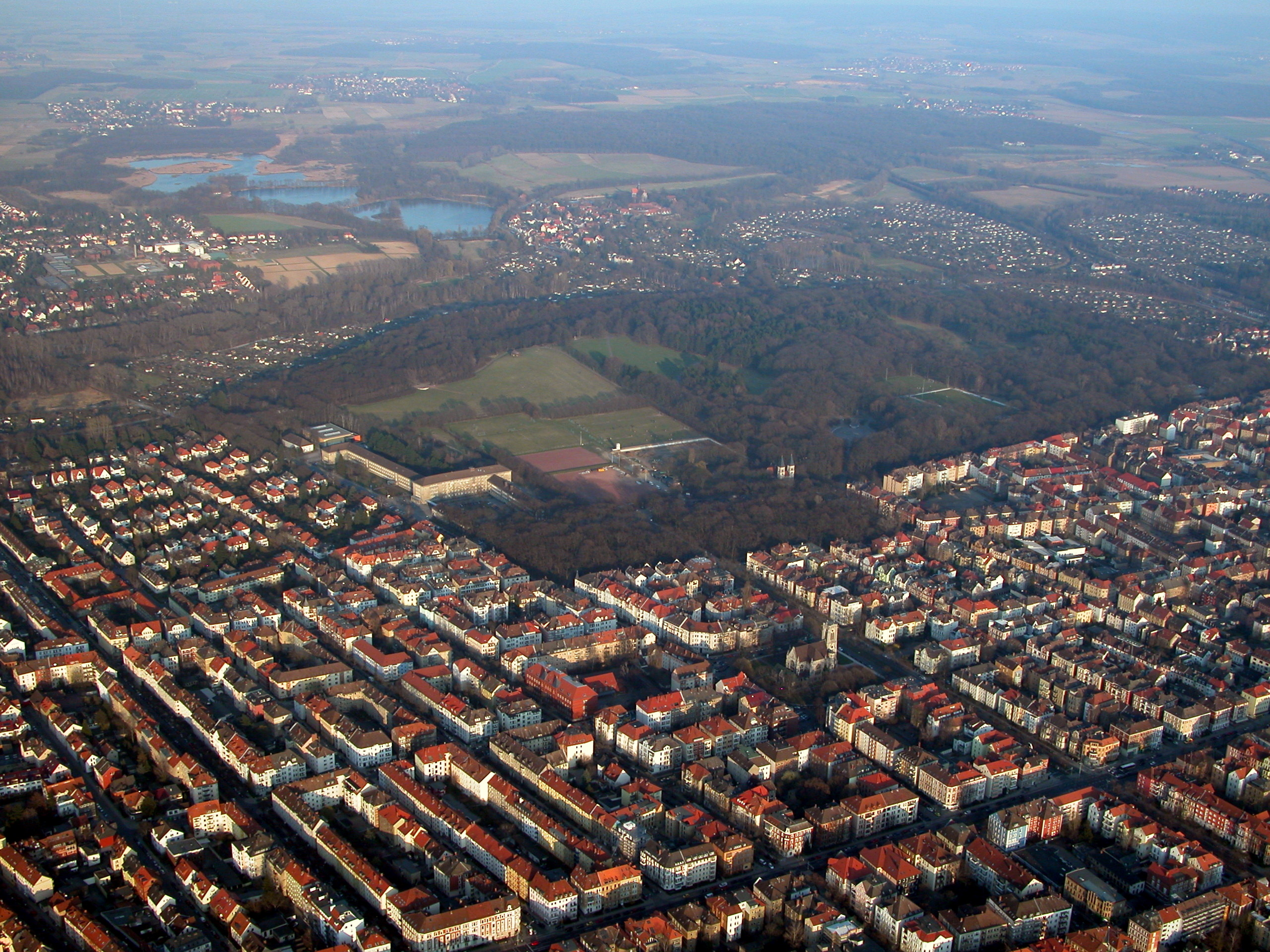
Östliches Ringgebiet

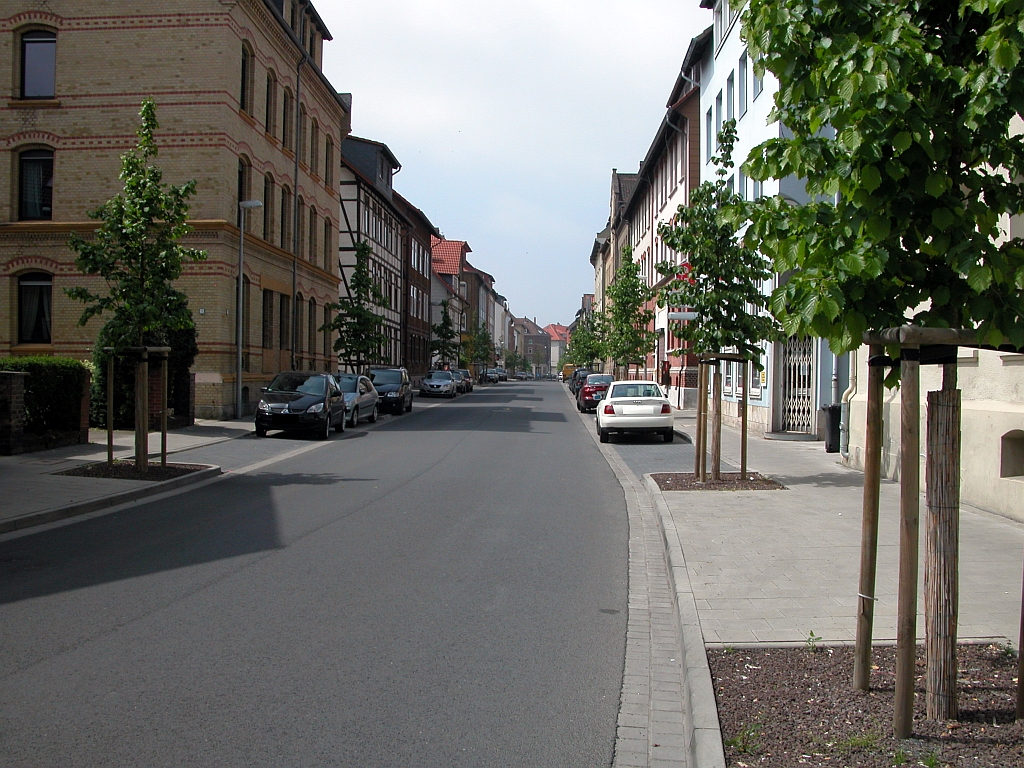
Westliches Ringgebiet

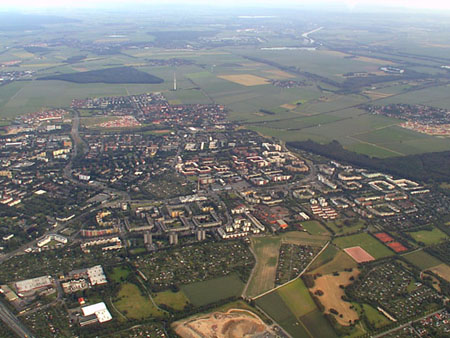
Weststadt

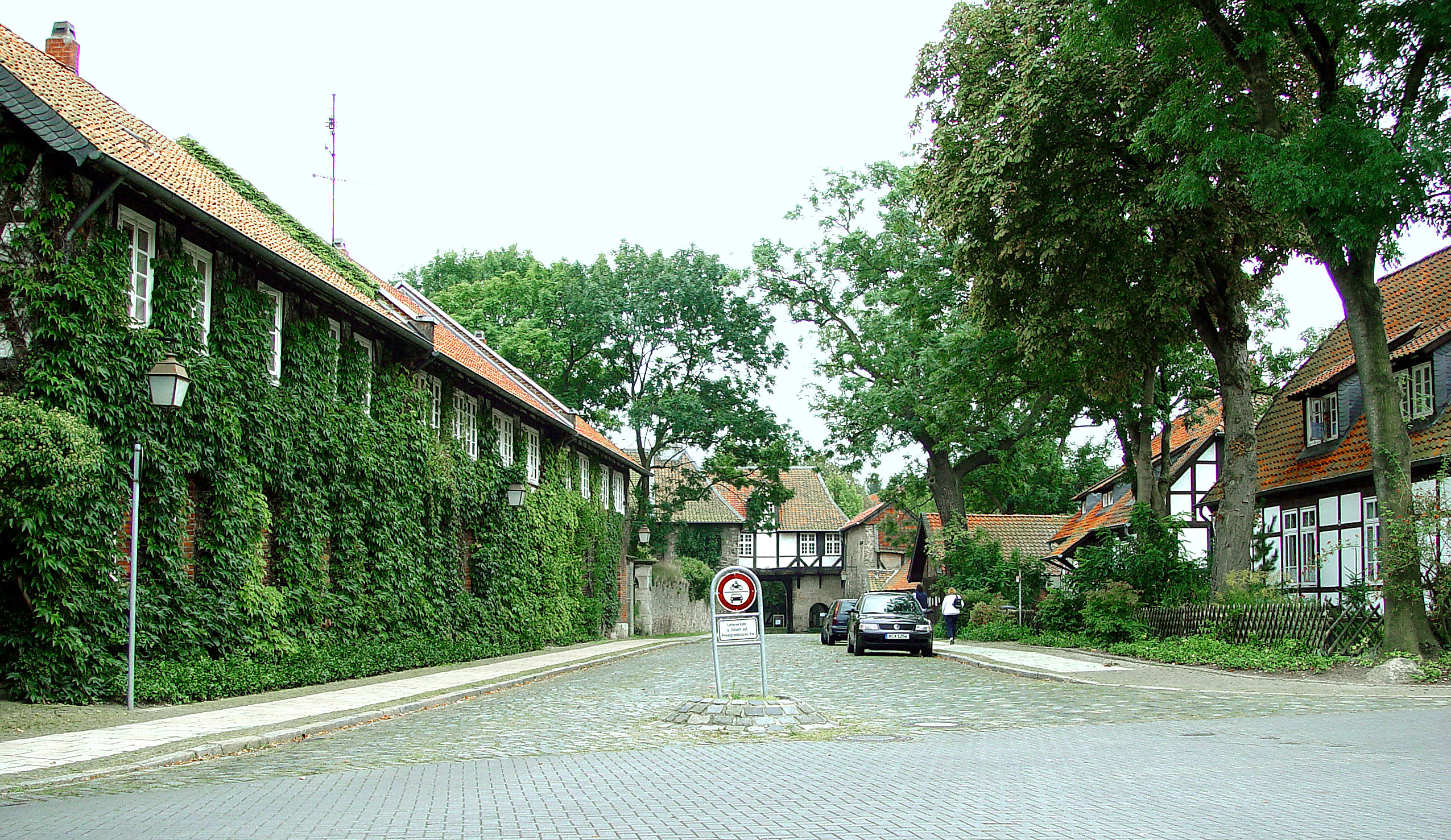
Riddagshausen (Wabe-Schunter-Beberbach)

=== Mayor ===
The current mayor of Braunschweig is Thorsten Kornblum of the Social Democratic Party (SPD); he has been mayor since 2021. The most recent mayoral election was held on 12 September 2021, with a runoff held on 26 September, and the results were as follows:

Candidate	Party	First round		Second round	
Candidate	Party	Votes	%	Votes	%
Thorsten Kornblum	Social Democratic Party	41,734	38.4	79,861	65.9
Kaspar Haller	Christian Democratic Union	29,011	26.7	41,401	34.1
Tatjana Schneider	Alliance 90/The Greens	24,802	22.8		
Mirco Hanker	Alternative for Germany	4,704	4.3		
Birgit Huvendieck	Citizens' Initiative Braunschweig	3,215	3.0		
Anke Schneider	The Left	2,827	2.6		
Thomas Hofmann	Die PARTEI	1,904	1.7		
Erdmann Gust	Independent	614	0.6		
Valid votes		108,811	99.3	121,262	98.1
Invalid votes		721	0.7	2,407	1.9
Total		109,532	100.0	123,669	100.0
Electorate/voter turnout		197,728	55.4	197,414	62.6
Source: City of Braunschweig

=== City council ===
Results of the 2021 city council election

The Braunschweig city council governs the city alongside the Mayor. The most recent city council election was held on 12 September 2021, and the results were as follows:

Party	Votes	%	+/-	Seats	+/-
Social Democratic Party (SPD)	93,546	29.5	▼3.5	16	▼2
Alliance 90/The Greens (Grüne)	71,880	22.7	▲10.6	12	▲5
Christian Democratic Union (CDU)	69,670	22.0	▼4.2	12	▼2
Free Democratic Party (FDP)	18,704	5.9	▲1.4	3	▲1
Citizens' Initiative Braunschweig	16,778	5.3	▼0.7	3	±0
Alternative for Germany (AfD)	13,512	4.3	▼4.6	2	▼3
The Left (Die Linke)	12,428	3.9	▼0.7	2	▼1
Volt Germany (Volt)	6,467	2.0	New	1	New
Die PARTEI (PARTEI)	6,302	2.0	▼0.5	1	±0
Pirate Party (Piraten)	3,261	1.0	▼1.4	1	±0
Grassroots Democratic Party (dieBasis)	2,999	0.9	New	1	New
Alliance for Innovation and Justice (BIG)	1,646	0.5	New	0	New
Total	317,193	100.0			
Valid votes	107,850	98.5			
Invalid votes	1,606	1.5			
Total	109,456	100.0		54	±0
Electorate/voter turnout	197,728	55.4	▼0.2		
Source: City of Braunschweig

== Transport ==
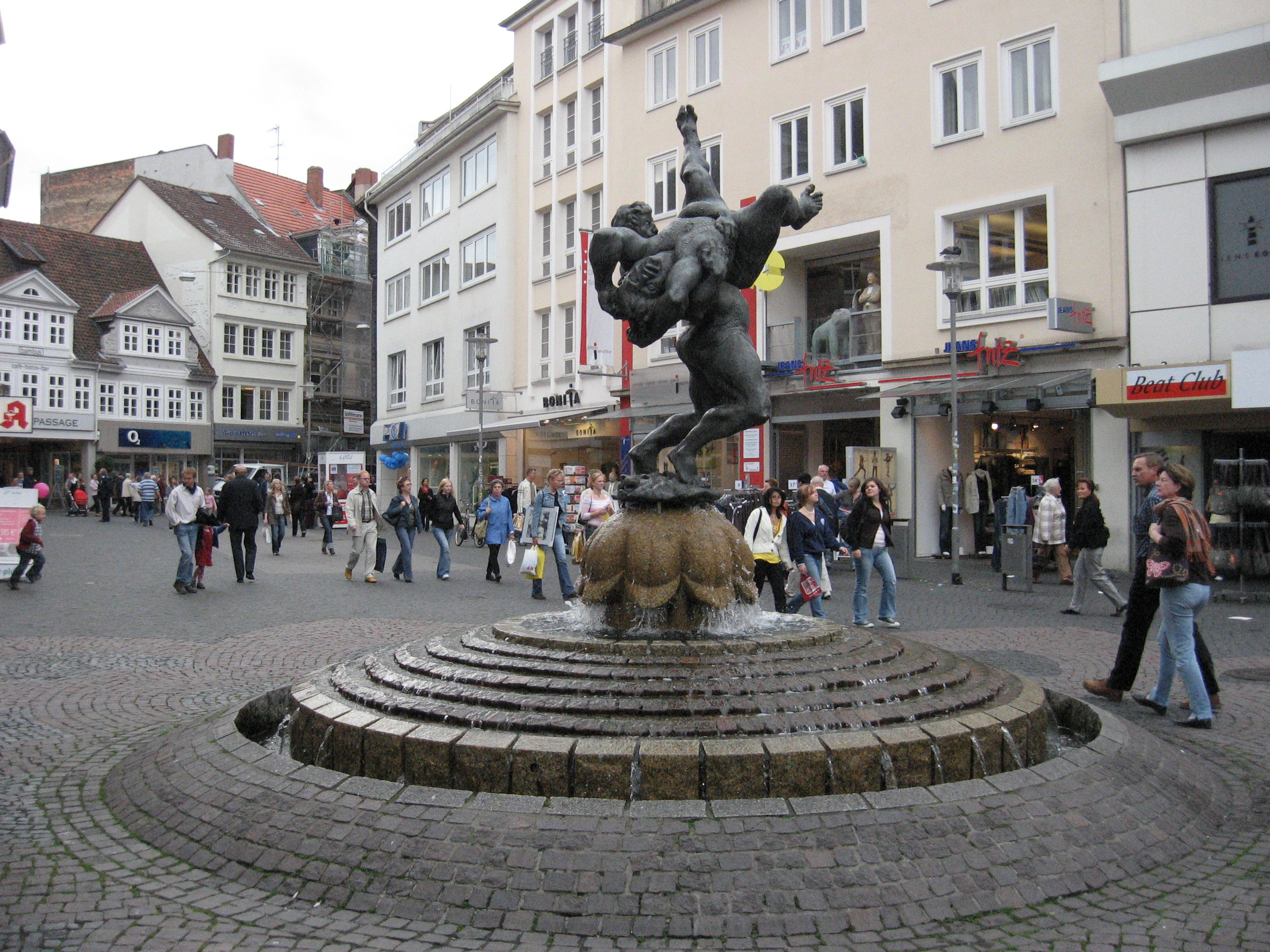
Pedestrian zone in the city centre

Braunschweig's city centre is mostly a car-free pedestrian zone.

=== Road ===
Two main autobahns serve Braunschweig, the A2 (Berlin—Hanover—Dortmund) and the A39 (Salzgitter—Wolfsburg) together with the A391 and A36. City roads are generally wide, as they were built after World War II to support the anticipated use of the car. There are several car parks in the city. Around 163,000 vehicles use the northern Highway cloverleaf intersect and 115,000 use the southern cloverleaf Highway intersect.

=== Bicycle ===
Many residents travel around town by bicycle using an extensive system of bicycle-only lanes. The main train station includes a bicycle parking area.

=== Train ===
Braunschweig central station

The city is on the main rail line between Frankfurt and Berlin, as well as a small hub on a few South- and North-bound branches to Bad Harzburg; Salzgitter; Gifhorn and two electrified 2 track branches towards Lehrte (and the Hannover-Berlin mainline), and towards Wolfsburg linking to the same mainline. Around 66,000 to 110,000 people use the main station daily.

Deutsche Bahn (German Railways, with their DB Regio Subsidiary) serves the city with a few local services, although Erixx towards Uelzen (Northwards) and Bad Harzburg (Southwards) operate the aforementioned directions, as well as Hildesheim and Wolfsburg (West-East respectively) trains having been handed to Enno, and the RE70 service to Hannover being run by the Westfalenbahn. Deutsche Bahn (German Railways, in this case their Fernverkehr subsidiary) operates inter-city and high-speed InterCityExpress (ICE) trains, with frequent stops at Braunschweig Central Station, with usual next/last stops being Hannover; Hildesheim; Magdeburg (on the Frankfurt-Berlin mainline)or Wolfsburg.

(German: Braunschweig Hauptbahnhof).

=== Tram and bus ===
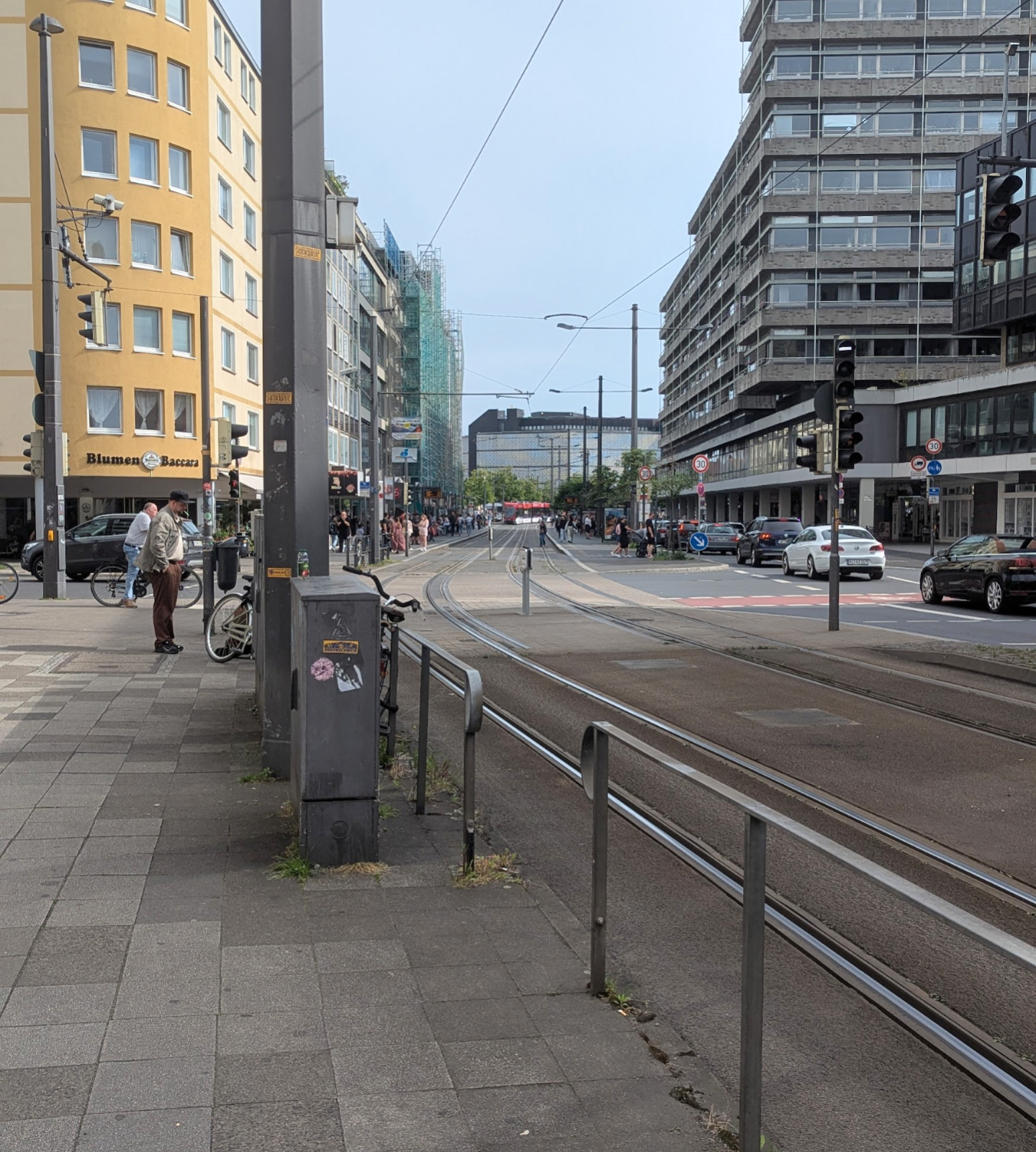
Main interchange station Rathaus in the city center.

The Braunschweig tramway network is an inexpensive and extensive 42.3 km (26 mi) long electric tramway system. First opened in 1897, it has been modernized, including a 3.2 km (2.0 mi) extension in 2007. The network has an 1,100 mm (3 ft 7 5/16 in) gauge, unique for a European railway or tramway network. However, it is being supplemented in stages by a third rail, to allow future joint working with the 1,435 mm (4 ft 8 1/2 in) standard gauge main railway network. Projects to extend the tram system 18 Kilometers (12 miles) more are planned to be completed by the year 2030. The daily ridership of the trams in Braunschweig is 135 000 and 75 000 for the Busses with an approximate count of 65 million annual passengers using the public transport system.

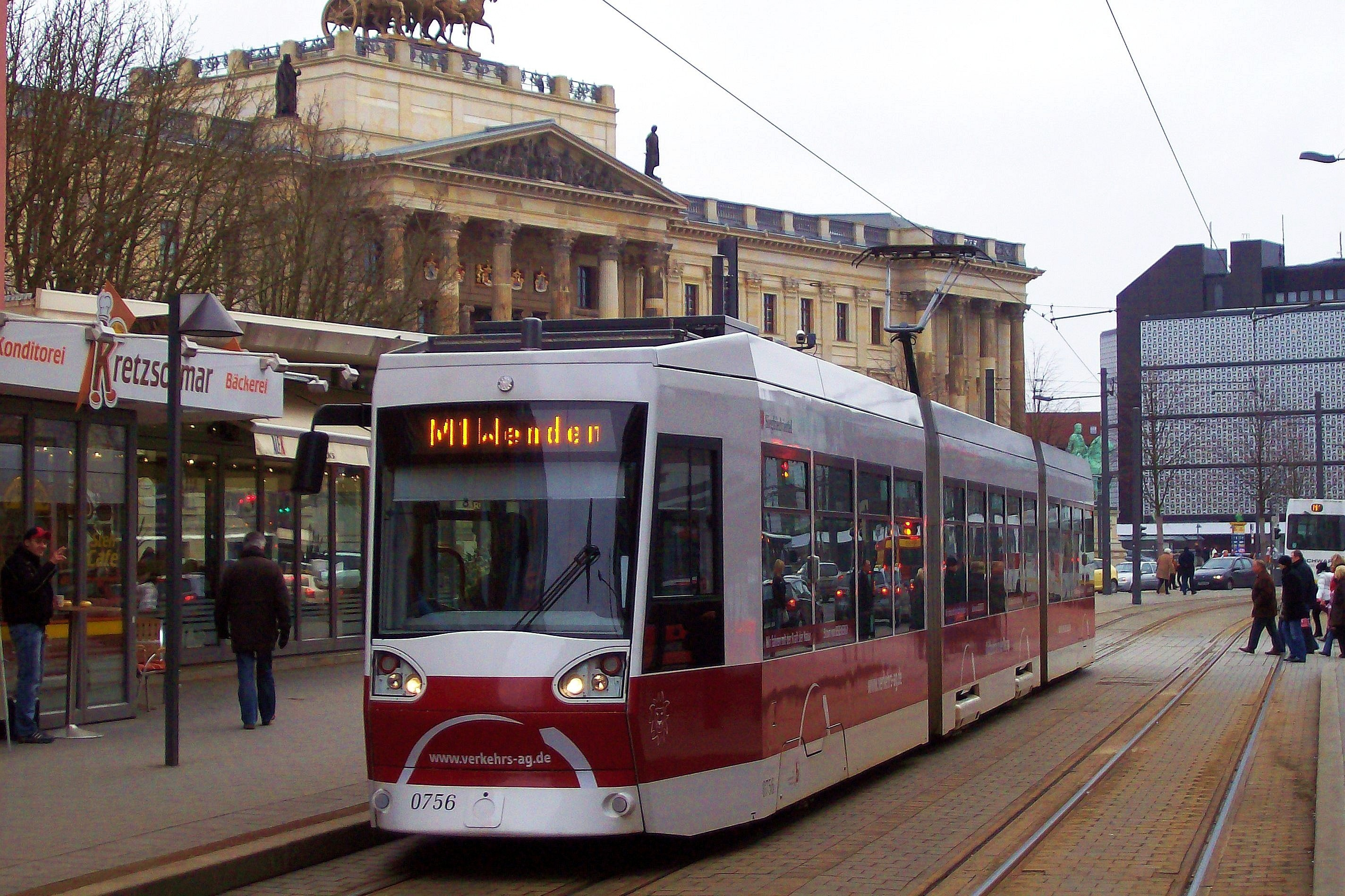
Tram in Braunschweig

The two main interchange ststions are Hauptbahnhof and Rathaus The municipally owned Braunschweiger Verkehrs-AG currently operates six tram lines and several bus lines. The tram lines are:

Line	from	to
Tram 1	Wenden	Stöckheim
Tram 2	Siegfriedviertel	Heidberg
Tram 3	Volkmarode	Weststadt Weserstraße
Tram 4	Radeklint	Helmstedter Straße
Tram 5	Hauptbahnhof	Broitzem
Tram 10	Hauptbahnhof	Rühme

=== Air ===
Braunschweig Airport (BWE / EDVE) is located north of the city at 52°19′N 10°33′E, elev. 295 ft (90 m). However, there are no scheduled public passenger or cargo services at the airport. The nearest passenger airport is Hannover Airport, located 70 km (43 mi) north west of Braunschweig.

== Name ==
Many other geographical locations around the world are named Brunswick, after the historical English name of Braunschweig. Between 1714 and 1837, the House of Hanover ruled Great Britain in personal union with the Electorate of Hanover. The House of Hanover was formally known as the House of Brunswick-Lüneburg, Hanover line. As a result, many places in the British colonies were named after Brunswick, such as the province of New Brunswick in Canada.

Ironically, the city of Braunschweig was not ruled by the Hanoverians while its name was being given to other Brunswicks around the world. Starting in 1269, the Duchy of Brunswick-Lüneburg underwent a series of divisions and mergers, with parts of the territory being transferred between various branches of the family. The city of Braunschweig went to the senior branch of the house, the Wolfenbüttel line, while Lüneburg eventually ended up with the Hanover line. Although the territory had been split, all branches of the family continued to style themselves as the House of Brunswick-Lüneburg. In 1884, the senior branch of the House of Welf became extinct. The Hanover line, being the last surviving line of the family, subsequently held the throne of the Duchy of Brunswick from November 1913 until November 1918.

== Government offices ==
The offices of the Luftfahrt-Bundesamt (LBA, "Federal Aviation Office") and the German Federal Bureau of Aircraft Accident Investigation (BFU) are located in Braunschweig.

== Research and science ==
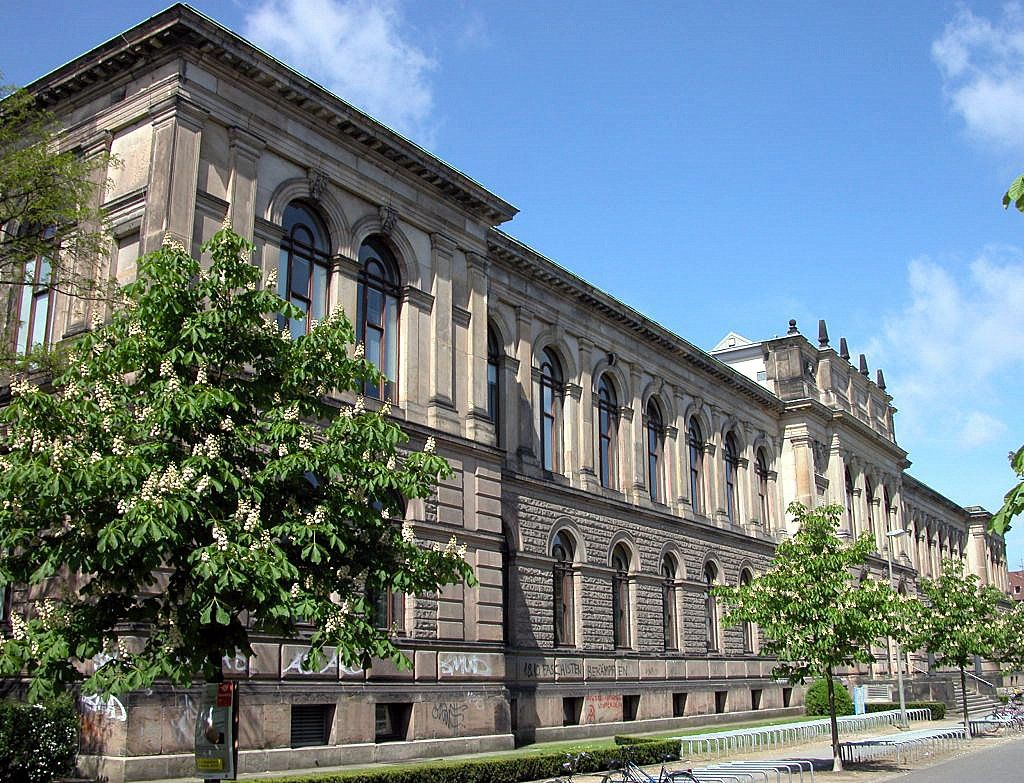
Braunschweig University of Technology

Braunschweig has been an important industrial area. Today it is known for its University and research institutes, mainly the Johann Heinrich von Thuenen Institute, the Julius Kühn-Institut, and the Institute for Animal Food of the Friedrich Loeffler Institute, until the end of 2007 all part of the Federal Agricultural Research Centre, the German Collection of Microorganisms and Cell Cultures, the Helmholtz Centre for Infection Research, and the Physikalisch-Technische Bundesanstalt (PTB). The PTB Braunschweig maintains the atomic clock responsible for the DCF77 time signal and the official German time. In 2006 the region of Braunschweig was the most R&D-intensive area in the whole European Economic Area, investing 7.1% of its GDP for research & technology. In 2019, the figure had risen to 7.79%, making Braunschweig retain its ranking as the most R&D-intensive region in Germany. In 2007 Braunschweig was presented the City of Science award by the Stifterverband für die Deutsche Wissenschaft.

Braunschweig University of Technology (German: Technische Universität Braunschweig) was founded in 1745 and is the oldest member of TU9, an incorporated society of the nine most prestigious, oldest, and largest universities focusing on engineering and technology in Germany. With approximately 18,000 students, Braunschweig University of Technology is the third largest university in Lower Saxony.

== Education ==
Also located in Braunschweig is the Martino-Katharineum, a secondary school founded in 1415. It has had several notable pupils, such as Carl Friedrich Gauss, Hoffmann von Fallersleben, Richard Dedekind and Louis Spohr. Since 2004, Braunschweig also has an International School. Other notable secondary schools include the Gymnasium Neue Oberschule, Gymnasium Gaussschule, Gymnasium Kleine Burg, Hoffmann-von-Fallersleben-Schule Braunschweig, Integrierte Gesamtschule Franzsches Feld, and Wilhelm-Gymnasium.

Lower Saxony's only university of art, founded in 1963, can be found in Braunschweig, the Hochschule für Bildende Künste Braunschweig (Braunschweig College of Fine Arts). The HBK is an institution of higher artistic and scientific education and offers the opportunity to study for interdisciplinary artistic and scientific qualifications. Additionally, one of the campuses of the Eastphalia University of Applied Sciences (German: Ostfalia Hochschule für angewandte Wissenschaften, formerly Fachhochschule Braunschweig/Wolfenbüttel) was located in the city until 2010.

== Economy ==
In 2015, the German weekly business news magazine Wirtschaftswoche ranked Braunschweig as one of the most dynamic economic spaces in all of Germany.

Braunschweig was one of the centres of the industrialization in Northern Germany. During the 19th and early 20th century the canning and railroad industries and the sugar production were of great importance for Braunschweig's economy, but eventually other branches such as the automotive industry became more important, while especially the canning industry began to vanish from the city after the end of World War II. The defunct truck and bus manufacturer Büssing was headquartered in Braunschweig. Current factories in the city include Volkswagen, Siemens, Bombardier Transportation, and Bosch.

The fashion label NewYorker, the publishing house Westermann Verlag, Nordzucker, Volkswagen Financial Services and Volkswagen Bank have their headquarters in the city as well as the Volkswagen utility vehicle holding. Also two major optical companies were headquartered in Braunschweig: Voigtländer and Rollei.

During the 1980s and early 1990s the computer companies Atari and Commodore International both had branches for development and production within the city.

Braunschweig is the home of two piano companies, both known worldwide for the high quality of their instruments: Schimmel and Grotrian-Steinweg. Both companies were founded in the 19th century. Additionally Sandberg Guitars is based in Braunschweig.

== Culture ==
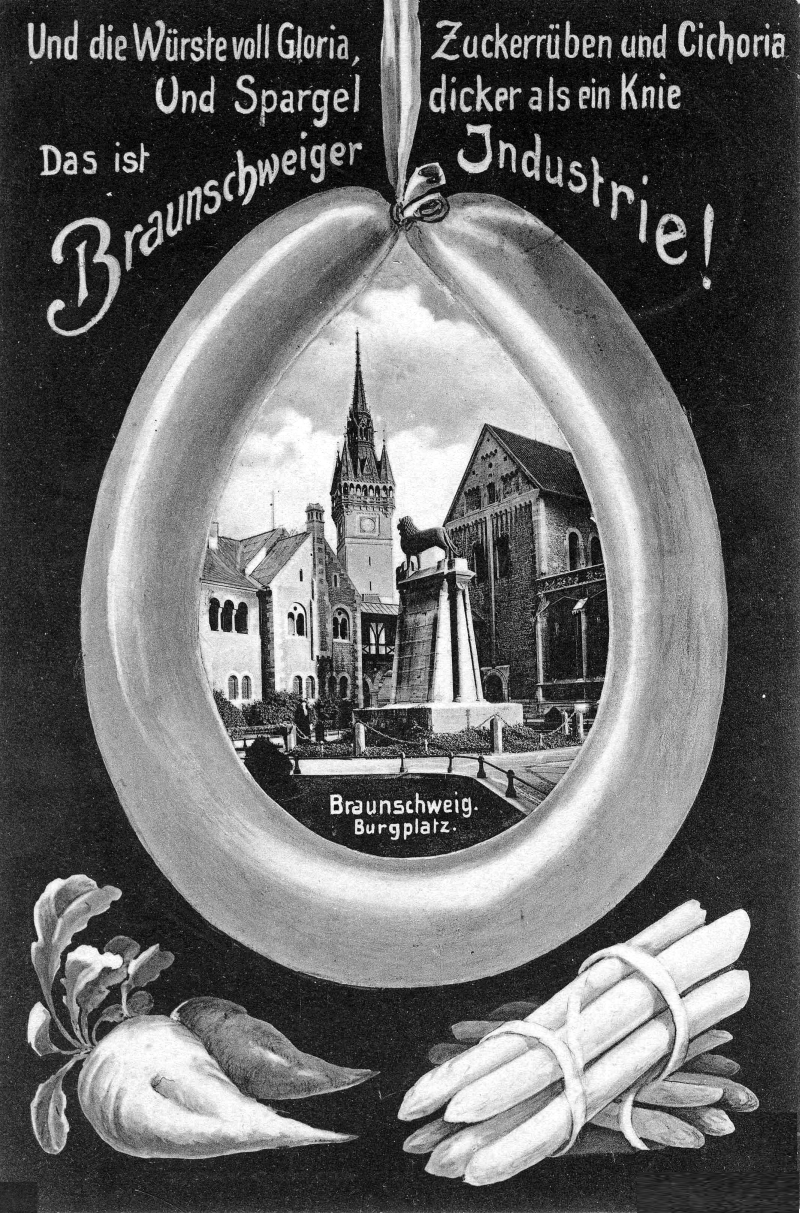
1904 postcard showing typical food of Braunschweig

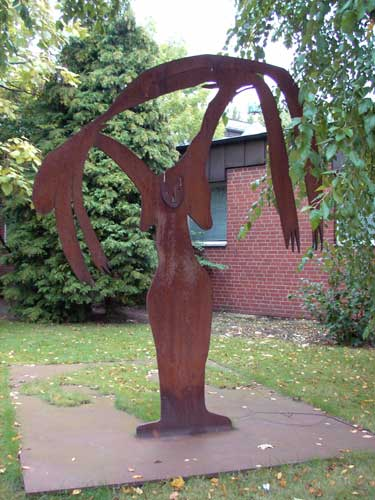
Piëta, by Menashe Kadishman, Braunschweig

Braunschweig is famous for Till Eulenspiegel, a medieval jester who played many practical jokes on its citizens. It also had many breweries, and still a very peculiar kind of beer is made called Mumme, first quoted in 1390, a malt-extract that was shipped all over the world. Two major breweries still produce in Braunschweig, the Hofbrauhaus Wolters, founded in 1627, and the former Feldschlößchen brewery, founded in 1871, now operated by Oettinger Beer.

Braunschweiger Mettwurst, a soft, spreadable smoked pork sausage, is named after the city. Other traditional local dishes include white asparagus, Braunschweiger Lebkuchen, Braunkohl (a variant of kale served with Bregenwurst), and Uhlen un Apen (Low German for "Owls and Guenons", a pastry).

=== Media ===
Braunschweig's major local newspaper is the Braunschweiger Zeitung, first published in 1946. Papers formerly published in Braunschweig include the Braunschweigische Anzeigen/Braunschweigische Staatszeitung (1745–1934), the Braunschweigische Landeszeitung (1880–1936) and the Braunschweiger Stadtanzeiger/Braunschweiger Allgemeiner Anzeiger (1886–1941), and the social-democratic Braunschweiger Volksfreund (1871–1933).

Near Braunschweig at Cremlingen-Abbenrode, there is a large medium wave transmitter, which transmits the program of Deutschlandfunk on 756 kHz, the Cremlingen transmitter.

=== Festivals ===
Schoduvel, a medieval Northern German form of carnival was celebrated in Braunschweig as early as the 13th century. Since 1979 an annual Rosenmontag parade is held in Braunschweig, the largest in Northern Germany, which is named Schoduvel in honour of the medieval custom.

An annual Weihnachtsmarkt (Christmas market) is held in late November and December on the Burgplatz in the centre of Braunschweig. In 2008 the market had 900,000 visitors.

=== Museums and galleries ===
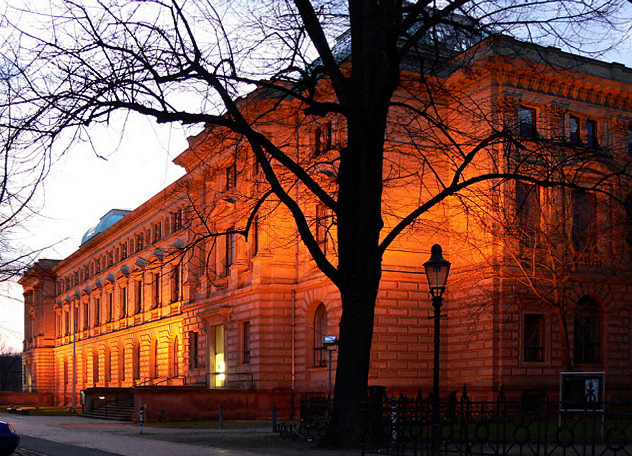
Herzog Anton Ulrich Museum

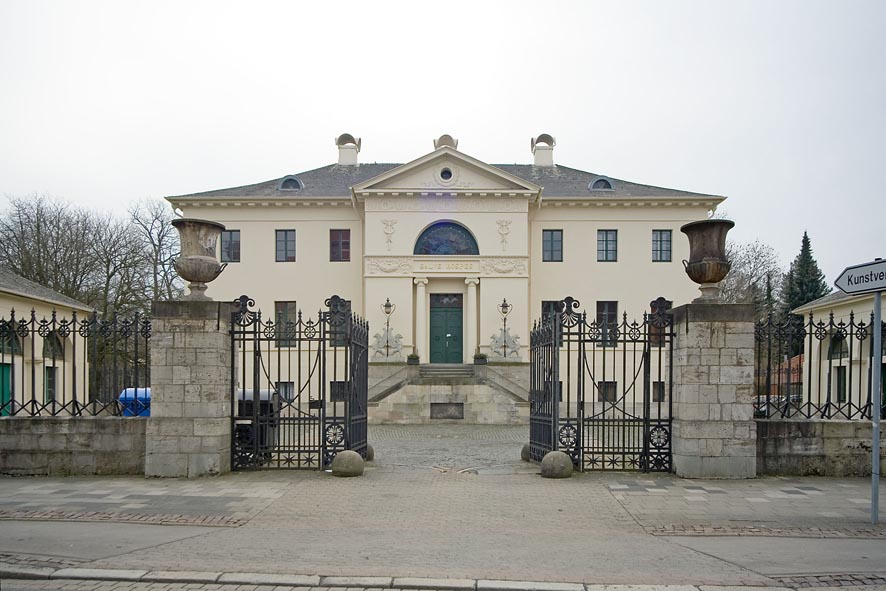
Villa Salve Hospes

The city's most important museum is the Herzog Anton Ulrich Museum, a well known art museum and the oldest public museum in Germany, founded in 1754. It houses a collection of masters of Western art, including Dürer, Giorgione, Cranach, Holbein, Van Dyck, Vermeer, Rubens, and Rembrandt.

The State Museum of Brunswick (Braunschweigisches Landesmuseum), founded in 1891, houses a permanent collection documenting the history of the Brunswick area ranging from its early history to the present.

The Municipal Museum of Brunswick (Städtisches Museum Braunschweig), founded in 1861, is a museum for art and cultural history, documenting the history of the city of Braunschweig.

The State Natural History Museum is a zoology museum founded in 1754.

Other museums in the city include the Museum of Photography (Museum für Photographie), the Jewish Museum (Jüdisches Museum), the Museum for Agricultural Technology Gut Steinhof, and the Gerstäcker-Museum. Frequent exhibitions of contemporary art are also held by the Art Society of Braunschweig (German: Kunstverein Braunschweig), housed in the Villa Salve Hospes, a classicist villa built between 1805 and 1808.

=== Music and dance ===
The Braunschweig Classix Festival was an annual classical music festival. It is the largest promoter of classical music in the region and one of the most prominent music festivals in Lower Saxony.

From 2001 to 2009, and again since 2013, the annual finals of the international breakdance competition Battle of the Year have been held at the Volkswagen Halle in Braunschweig.

Braunschweiger TSC is among the leading competitive formation dance teams in the world and has won multiple World and European championship titles.

=== Sports ===
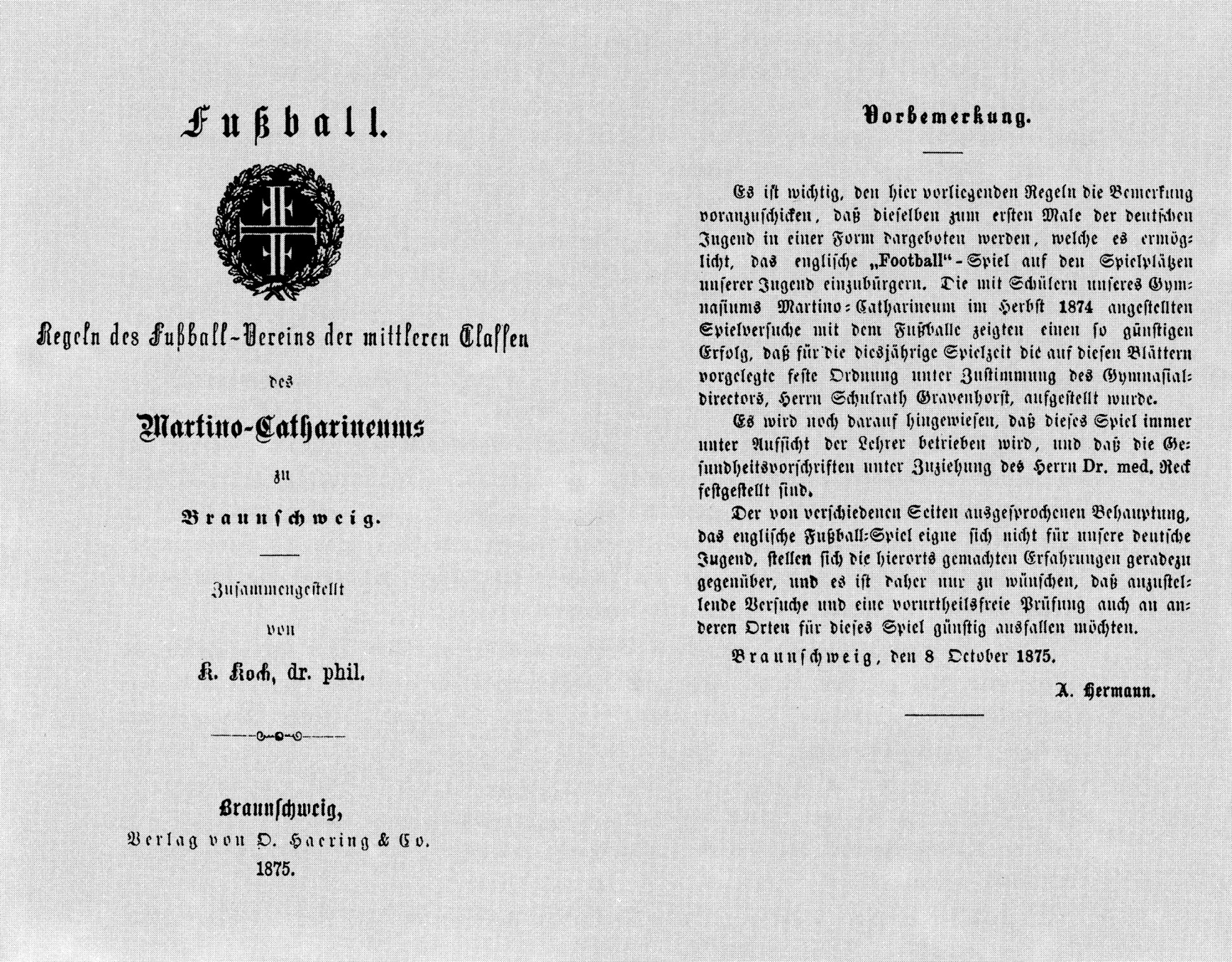
The first German version of the rules of football by Konrad Koch

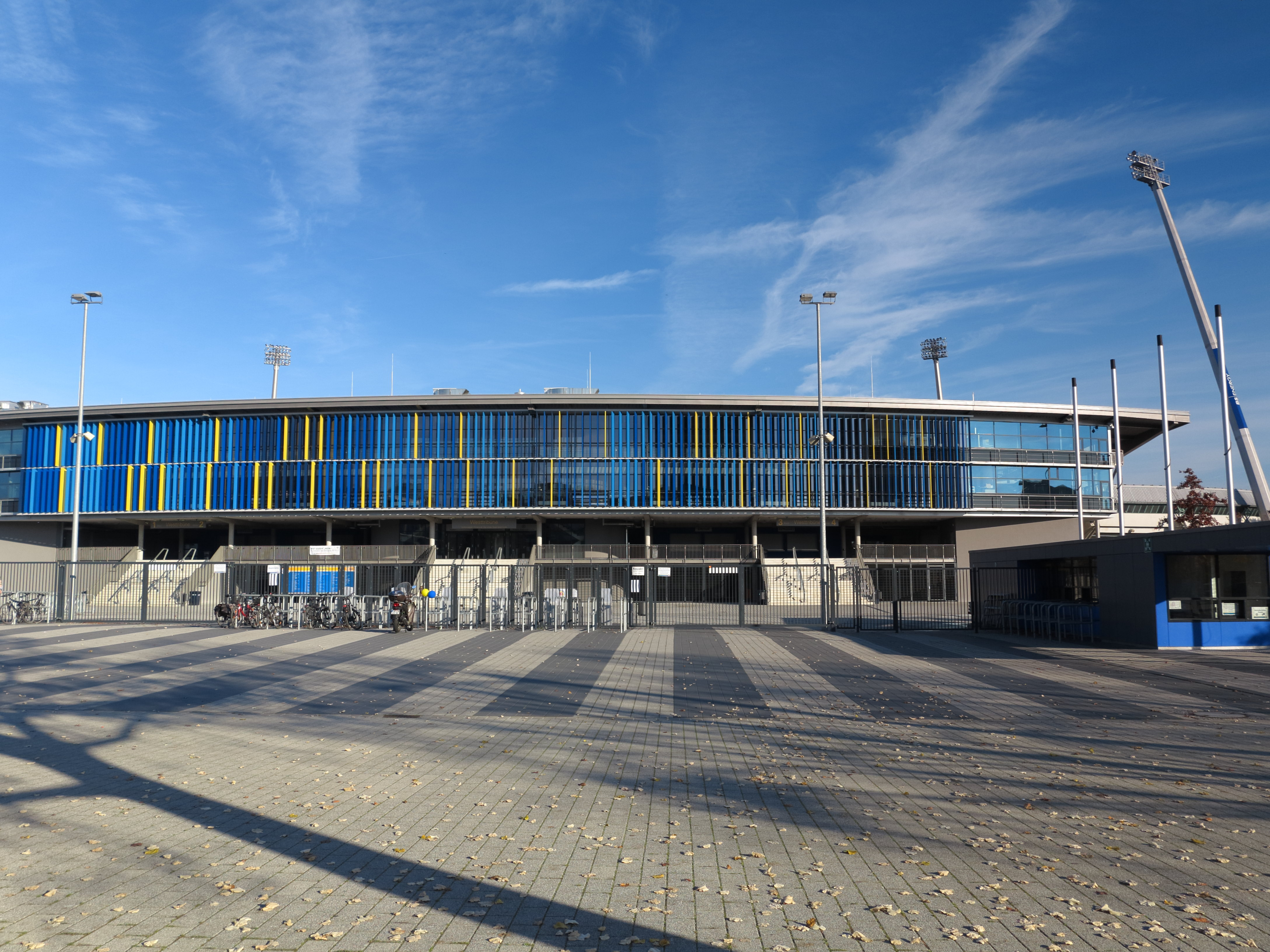
Eintracht-Stadion, the stadium of 2. Bundesliga club Eintracht Braunschweig

Braunschweig's major local football team is Eintracht Braunschweig. Founded in 1895, Eintracht Braunschweig can look back on a long and chequered history. Eintracht Braunschweig won the German football championship in 1967, and currently plays in the 2. Bundesliga, the second tier of German football, and attracts a large number of supporters. In the 2025–26 season, BTSV Eintracht recorded an average home attendance of 21,084 across 17 home matches at the Eintracht-Stadion in Braunschweig.

Braunschweig was also arguably the city in which the first ever game of football in Germany took place. The game had been brought to Germany by the local school teacher Konrad Koch, also the first to write down a German version of the rules of football, (Note: However, Koch's original German version of the rules of football, published in 1875, still resembled Rugby football—the unmodified rules of The Football Association were not commonly used in Germany before the 1900s.) who organized the first match between pupils from his school Martino-Katharineum in 1874. The 2011 German drama film Lessons of a Dream is based on Koch.

Eintracht Braunschweig also fields a successful women's field hockey team that claimed nine national championship titles between 1965 and 1978. In the past, the club also had first or second-tier teams in the sports of ice hockey, field handball, and water polo.

The New Yorker Lions (formerly Braunschweig Lions) are the city's American football team, winning a record number of 12 German Bowl titles, as well as five Eurobowls (a shared record).

The city's professional basketball team, the Basketball Löwen Braunschweig, plays in the Basketball Bundesliga, the highest level in Germany. The Löwen's predecessor SG Braunschweig had previously played in the Bundesliga as well. Eintracht Braunschweig's women's basketball team plays in the 2. Damen-Basketball-Bundesliga, the second tier of women's basketball in Germany.

In handball, MTV Braunschweig, the city's oldest sports club (founded in 1847), plays in the semi-professional 3. Liga.

Other sports clubs from Braunschweig that play or have played at the Bundesliga or 2nd Bundesliga level include Spot Up 89ers (baseball), Braunschweiger THC (field hockey), SV Süd Braunschweig (handball), Rugby-Welfen Braunschweig (rugby union), and USC Braunschweig (volleyball).

Annual sporting events held in Braunschweig include the international equestrian tournament Löwen Classics, Rund um den Elm, Germany's oldest road bicycle race, and the professional tennis tournament Sparkassen Open.

== Twin towns – sister cities ==
Braunschweig is twinned with:

- Bandung, Indonesia (1960)
- Nîmes, France (1962)
- (United Kingdom) Bath, UK (1971)
- Sousse, Tunisia (1980)
- Kiryat Tiv'on, Israel (1985)
- Magdeburg, Germany (1987)
- Kazan, Russia (1988)
- Omaha, United States (1992)
- Zhuhai, China (2011)
- (South Africa) Nelson Mandela Bay, (2024)

== Notable people ==
Alphabetical list of some notable people associated with Braunschweig

- Hermann Blumenau (1819–1899), founder of Blumenau, Brazil.
- Johann Joachim Christoph Bode (1731–1793), translator
- Bosse (born 1980), rock musician
- Wilhelm Bracke (1842–1880), one of the founders of the Social Democratic Workers' Party of Germany, predecessor of the Social Democratic Party of Germany.
- Axel Freiherr von dem Bussche-Streithorst (1919–1993), military officer and member of the German resistance.
- Heinrich Büssing (1843–1929), industrialist
- Joachim Heinrich Campe (1746–1818), educator and writer
- Caroline of Brunswick (1768–1821), Queen consort of King George IV of the United Kingdom
- Richard Dedekind (1831–1916), mathematician
- Paul Drude (1863–1906), physicist, developed the Drude model.
- Christine Enghaus (1815–1910), actress
- Johann Joachim Eschenburg (1743–1820), produced the first complete German translation of William Shakespeare's plays.
- Frederick William, Duke of Brunswick-Wolfenbüttel (1771–1815), leader of the Black Brunswickers.
- Günter Gaus (1929–2004), journalist
- Carl Friedrich Gauss (1777–1855), mathematician
- Friedrich Gerstäcker (1816–1872), writer
- Gerhard Glogowski (born 1943), politician
- Otto Grotewohl (1894–1964), Prime minister of the German Democratic Republic
- Otto Harder (1892–1956), German international footballer
- Adolph Henke (1775–1843), physician
- Henry the Lion (1129–1195), Duke of Saxony and Bavaria
- August Hermann (1835–1906), "Braunschweig's Father of Physical Education"
- August Heinrich Hoffmann von Fallersleben (1798–1874), poet and author of Das Lied der Deutschen.
- Ricarda Huch (1864–1947), historian and writer
- Rainer Hunold (born 1949), actor
- Ernst August Friedrich Klingemann (1777–1831), writer
- Gustav Knuth (1901–1987), actor
- Gerard Krefft (1830–1881), Australian zoologist, born in Brunswick
- Alfred Kubel (1909–1999), politician
- August Lafontaine (1758–1831), author of sentimental didactic novels once immensely popular, born and brought up in the city
- Johann Anton Leisewitz (1752–1806), poet
- Gotthold Ephraim Lessing (1729–1781), writer and philosopher
- Lothar Osterburg (born 1961), printmaker and visual artist
- Otto IV of Brunswick (1175–1218), Holy Roman Emperor
- Bernhard Plockhorst (1825–1907), painter
- Agnes Pockels (1862–1935), chemist
- Wilhelm Raabe (1831–1910), writer
- Friedrich Adolf Riedesel (1738–1800), commander during the American Revolutionary War
- Galka Scheyer (1889–1945), painter
- Dennis Schröder (born 1993), NBA basketball player, currently with the Charlotte Hornets.
- Norbert Schultze (1911–2002), composer
- Hans Sommer (1837–1922), composer and mathematician
- Louis Spohr (1784–1859), composer
- Henry E. (1797–1871) and C. F. Theodore Steinway (1825–1889), piano makers
- Ludger Tom Ring the Younger (1522–1584), painter
- Susan Wayland (1980–), fetish fashion model
- Friedrich Georg Weitsch (1758–1828), painter
- Christian Ludewig Theodor Winkelmann (1812–1875), piano maker
- Franz Winter (1861–1930), archaeologist
- Caroline Wiseneder (1807-1868) composer
- Michael Zickerick (born 1948), diplomat

== See also ==
- Hannover–Braunschweig–Göttingen–Wolfsburg Metropolitan Region

== Bibliography ==
- Richard Andree: Braunschweiger Volkskunde. 2nd edition. Vieweg, Braunschweig 1901.
- Reinhard Bein, Ernst-August Roloff (eds.): Der Löwe unterm Hakenkreuz. Reiseführer durch Braunschweig und Umgebung 1930–1945. MatrixMedia Verlag, Göttingen 2010, ISBN 3-93231336-4.
- Luitgard Camerer, Manfred Garzmann, Wolf-Dieter Schuegraf (eds.): Braunschweiger Stadtlexikon. Joh. Heinr. Meyer Verlag, Braunschweig 1992, ISBN 3-926701-14-5.
- Oskar Doering: Braunschweig. E. A. Seemann, Leipzig 1905.
- Hermann Dürre: Geschichte der Stadt Braunschweig im Mittelalter. Grüneberg, Braunschweig 1861.
- Reinhard Dorn: Mittelalterliche Kirchen in Braunschweig. Niemeyer, Hameln 1978, ISBN 3-87585-043-2.
- F. Fuhse (ed.): Vaterländische Geschichten und Denkwürdigkeiten der Lande Braunschweig und Hannover, Band 1: Braunschweig. 3rd edition. Appelhans Verlag, Braunschweig 1925.
- Manfred Garzmann, Wolf-Dieter Schuegraf (eds.): Braunschweiger Stadtlexikon. Ergänzungsband. Joh. Heinr. Meyer Verlag, Braunschweig 1996, ISBN 3-926701-30-7.
- Otto Hohnstein: Braunschweig am Ende des Mittelalters. Ramdohr, Braunschweig 1886.
- Horst-Rüdiger Jarck, Gerhard Schildt (eds.): Die Braunschweigische Landesgeschichte. Jahrtausendrückblick einer Region. 2nd edition. Appelhans Verlag, Braunschweig 2001, ISBN 3-930292-28-9.
- Horst-Rüdiger Jarck, Dieter Lent et al. (eds.): Braunschweigisches Biographisches Lexikon – 8. bis 18. Jahrhundert. Appelhans Verlag, Braunschweig 2006, ISBN 3-937664-46-7.
- Horst-Rüdiger Jarck, Günter Scheel (eds.): Braunschweigisches Biographisches Lexikon – 19. und 20. Jahrhundert. Hahnsche Buchhandlung, Hannover 1996, ISBN 3-7752-5838-8.
- Jörg Leuschner, Karl Heinrich Kaufhold, Claudia Märtl (eds.): Die Wirtschafts- und Sozialgeschichte des Braunschweigischen Landes vom Mittelalter bis zur Gegenwart. 3 vols. Georg Olms Verlag, Hildesheim 2008, ISBN 978-3-487-13599-1.
- Richard Moderhack (ed.): Braunschweigische Landesgeschichte im Überblick. 3rd edition, Braunschweigischer Geschichtsverein, Braunschweig 1979.
- Richard Moderhack: Braunschweiger Stadtgeschichte. Wagner, Braunschweig 1997, ISBN 3-87884-050-0.
- E. Oppermann: Landeskunde des Herzogtums Braunschweig. Geschichte und Geographie. E. Appelhans, Braunschweig 1911.
- Rudolf Prescher: Der Rote Hahn über Braunschweig. Waisenhaus-Buchdruckerei und Verlag, Braunschweig 1955.
- Birte Rogacki-Thiemann: Braunschweig. Eine kleine Stadtgeschichte. Sutton Verlag, Erfurt 2005, ISBN 3-89702-837-9.
- Ernst-August Roloff: Braunschweig und der Staat von Weimar. Waisenhaus-Buchdruckerei und Verlag, Braunschweig 1964.
- Ernst-August Roloff: Wie braun war Braunschweig? Hitler und der Freistaat Braunschweig. Braunschweiger Zeitung, Braunschweig 2003.
- Gerd Spies (ed.): Braunschweig – Das Bild der Stadt in 900 Jahren. Geschichte und Ansichten. 2 vols., Städtisches Museum Braunschweig, Braunschweig 1985.
- Gerd Spies (ed.): Brunswiek 1031 – Braunschweig 1981. Die Stadt Heinrichs des Löwen von den Anfängen bis zur Gegenwart. 2 vols., Städtisches Museum Braunschweig, Braunschweig 1982.
- Werner Spieß: Geschichte der Stadt Braunschweig im Nachmittelalter. Vom Ausgang des Mittelalters bis zum Ende der Stadtfreiheit 1491–1671. 2 vols., Waisenhaus-Buchdruckerei und Verlag, Braunschweig 1966, OCLC 7495150.
- Henning Steinführer, Gerd Biegel (eds.): 1913 – Braunschweig zwischen Monarchie und Moderne. Appelhans Verlag, Braunschweig 2015, ISBN 978-3-944939-12-4.
