= Timeline of Braunschweig =

The following is a timeline of the history of the city of Braunschweig (Brunswick), Germany.

== Prior to 19th century ==
- 861 – According to legend, Braunschweig founded by Bruno of Saxony.
- 955 – Area of city expanded.
- 1031 – St. Magni (Braunschweig) church consecrated.
- 1145 – Riddagshausen Abbey founded.
- 1160s – Henry the Lion makes Braunschweig his residence.
- 1166 – Brunswick Lion statue created.
- 1175
  - Dankwarderode Castle built.
  - Birth of Otto IV, Holy Roman Emperor
- 1188 – Gospels of Henry the Lion created.
- 1190s – St. Martini (Braunschweig) church construction begins.
- 1194 – Brunswick Cathedral built.
- 1194 – 6 August: Henry the Lion dies.
- 1200s
  - St. Katharinen (Braunschweig) church construction begins.
  - Braunschweig joins the Hanseatic League.
  - Schoduvel (carnival) is celebrated.
- 1245 – Großes Waisenhaus BMV (nursing home and orphanage) established.
- 1293–94 – Schicht der Gildemeister (civil unrest)
- 1304 – Bartholomäuskapelle (Braunschweig) on Schützenstraße (Braunschweig) first mentioned.
- 1307 – Gewandhaus (Braunschweig) guildhall/exchange first mentioned.
- 1312 – Rüningen gristmill first mentioned.
- 1370s – Große Schicht (civil unrest)
- 1390
  - Public clock installed (approximate date).
  - Brunswick Mum is sold.
- 1396 – Altstadtrathaus (Braunschweig) (city hall) building expanded.
- 1408 – Altstadtmarktbrunnen (fountain) installed in the Altstadtmarkt (Braunschweig).
- 1410s
  - Liberei (library) built.
  - Braunschweiger Pfaffenkrieg (conflict between city council and churches)
- 1411 – Faule Mette cannon created.
- 1415 – Martino-Katharineum Braunschweig secondary school established.
- 1420 – St. Andreas (Braunschweig) church built (approximate date).
- 1432 – The Princes of Brunswick-Wolfenbüttel move their Residenz from Braunschweig to Wolfenbüttel.
- 1434 – Aegidienkirche (church) built (approximate date).
- 1445–46 – Schicht der „ungehorsamen Bürger“ (civil unrest)
- 1451 – Brüdernkirche (Braunschweig) (church) built.
- 1487–89 – Ludeke Hollants Schicht (civil unrest)
- 1498 – Braunschweiger Messe (fair) established.
- 1509 – Printing press in operation.
- 1520s – Protestant Reformation in Braunschweig.
- 1524 – Huneborstelsches Haus built.
- 1531–32 – Braunschweig joins Schmalkaldic League.
- 1534 – Alte Waage (Braunschweig) built.
- 1551 – Population: 16,192.
- 1567 – Haus zur Hanse built.
- 1573 – Veltheimsches Haus built on the Burgplatz (Braunschweig).
- 1627 – Hofbrauhaus Wolters (brewery) established.
- 1643 – Ehemaliges Rüninger Zollhaus (customs house) built.
- 1663 – Trial and execution of Anna Roleffes.
- 1671 – Siege of Braunschweig by Rudolph Augustus, Duke of Brunswick-Lüneburg
- 1690 – Opernhaus am Hagenmarkt (opera house and theatre) opens.
- 1745
  - Collegium Carolinum founded.
  - Braunschweigische Anzeigen newspaper in publication.
- 1753 – Brunswick Palace established as the new ducal residence.
- 1754 – Herzog Anton Ulrich-Museum and State Natural History Museum open.
- 1761 – First Battle of Ölper
- 1768 – Birth of Caroline of Brunswick future wife of George IV.
- 1769 – Schloss Richmond (castle) built.
- 1772 – 13 March: Premiere of Lessing's play Emilia Galotti.
- 1773 – Population: 23,385.
- 1790s – Braunschweig fortifications dismantled (approximate date).
- 1791 – Lange Brücke (Braunschweig) (bridge) rebuilt.
- 1799 – Friedrich Vieweg (publisher) moves to Braunschweig.

== 19th century ==
- 1806 – French in power; Braunschweig French period begins.
- 1807 – Wilhelm Albrecht Christian von Mahrenholtz becomes mayor.
- 1809 – 1 August: Second Battle of Ölper
- 1815 – Duchy of Brunswick established
- 1823 – Obelisk erected in the Löwenwall.
- 1829 – 19 January: Premiere of Goethe's play Faust, Part One.
- 1830 – 7–8 September: Civil unrest, Brunswick Palace stormed by an angry mob and destroyed completely.
- 1834 – Attained municipal self-government.
- 1835 – Grotrian-Steinweg established.
- 1838 – Westermann Verlag (publisher) in business.
- 1838 – 1 December: First section of the Brunswick–Bad Harzburg railway line, connecting Braunschweig and Wolfenbüttel, opens.
- 1843–44 – Hanover–Brunswick railway opens.
- 1844 – Rabbinical Conference of Brunswick
- 1847 – MTV Braunschweig established.
- 1848–49 – German revolution of 1848–49 in Braunschweig
- 1849 – Voigtländer sets up its office in Braunschweig.
- 1853 – Braunschweigische Bank active.
- 1856 – Westermanns Monatshefte (magazine) headquartered in Braunschweig.
- 1860 – Braunschweig City Archive established.
- 1861
  - Staatstheater Braunschweig (theatre) opens.
  - Stadtbibliothek Braunschweig (library) and Städtisches Museum (Braunschweig) founded.
- 1863 – Braunschweiger Quadriga sculpture erected atop the palace.
- 1871
  - Braunschweiger Volksfreund newspaper in publication.
  - Feldschlößchen (Braunschweig) brewery in business.
  - Population: 57,883.
- 1872 – Brunswick–Magdeburg railway begins operating.
- 1874 – Konrad Koch introduces football to Germany.
- 1875 – 23 September: Neue Synagoge (Braunschweig) opens.
- 1879 – Trams in Braunschweig begin operating.
- 1880 – Population: 75,038.
- 1885 – Population: 85,174.
- 1887 – Braunschweig Main Cemetery (cemetery) established.
- 1890 – Population: 101,047.
- 1891 – Braunschweigisches Landesmuseum founded.
- 1894–1900 – New Braunschweiger Rathaus (city hall) built.
- 1895
  - Eintracht Braunschweig football club and Jüdischer Friedhof (Braunschweig) (cemetery) established.
  - Wilhelm Scholz bookseller in business.
  - Population: 115,138.

== 20th century ==
=== 1900–1945 ===
- 1901 – Braunschweigischer Geschichtsverein (historical society) founded.
- 1903 – Büssing established.
- 1905 – Population: 136,423.
- 1906 – Dankwarderode Castle reconstructed.
- 1907 – Panther Fahrradwerke (bicycle manufactory) in business.
- 1909 – 21 April: Gymnasium Gaussschule established.
- 1913 – 24 May: Marriage of Ernest Augustus, Duke of Brunswick and Princess Victoria Louise of Prussia.
- 1918
  - November Revolution in Braunschweig occurs.
  - 8 November: Ernest Augustus forced to abdicate.
  - 10 November: Socialist Republic of Brunswick proclaimed.
  - 10 November: Free State of Brunswick established.
- 1919
  - 9 April: Spartacus League uprising.
  - 13–17 April: State of emergency declared, Freikorps troops enter city.
  - Population: 139,539.
- 1920 – Rollei established.
- 1923 – 17 June: Eintracht-Stadion opens.
- 1929 – Deutsche Verkehrsfliegerschule moved to Broitzem.
- 1931
  - Veltenhof is incorporated into the city of Braunschweig.
  - Braunschweiger Tageszeitung (newspaper) begins publication.
  - 17–18 October: A large Nazi rally is held in Braunschweig, 100,000 SA stormtroopers march through the city.
- 1933 – Mittelland Canal reaches Braunschweig.
- 1934
  - Gliesmarode, Lehndorf (Braunschweig), Melverode, Ölper, Querum, Riddagshausen, and Rühme are incorporated into the city of Braunschweig.
  - Population: 166,823.
- 1935 – SS-Junkerschule Braunschweig established.
- 1936
  - Luftfahrtforschungsanstalt in Völkenrode built.
  - Braunschweig Airport opens.
- 1938
  - Niedersächsische Musikschule Braunschweig (formerly Brunswick State Conservatoire) established.
  - 23 February: Volkswagenwerk Braunschweig starts production.
  - 9–10 November: Kristallnacht in Braunschweig.
- 1939
  - Nazi Academy for Youth Leadership built.
  - 20 September: Oflag XI-B POW camp for Polish officers established.
  - Population: 208,400.
- 1940
  - 24 June: Oflag XI-B POW camp dissolved, POWs transferred to Oflag II-C in Dobiegniew.
  - Synagogue demolished.
  - Bombing of Braunschweig in World War II begins.
- 1943 – Entbindungsheim für Ostarbeiterinnen established.
- 1944
  - 25 March: Subcamp of the Neuengamme concentration camp established at the SS troop supply camp.
  - 5 June: Subcamp of Neuengamme at the SS troop supply camp dissolved. Prisoners deported to a subcamp in Warberg.
  - 17 August: Schillstraße subcamp of the Neuengamme concentration camp established.
  - September: Braunschweig-Vechelde subcamp of Neuengamme established.
  - December: Women subcamp of Neuengamme established at the SS Riding School.
- 1945
  - February: Women subcamp of Neuengamme at the SS Riding School dissolved. Prisoners deported to subcamps in Salzgitter and Helmstedt.
  - March: Braunschweig-Vechelde subcamp of Neuengamme dissolved. Prisoners moved to the Schillstraße subcamp.
  - March/April: Schillstraße subcamp of Neuengamme dissolved. Prisoners sent on a death march to Salzgitter.
  - 12 April: Surrender of Braunschweig.

=== 1946–1999 ===
- 1946 – Braunschweiger Zeitung (newspaper) begins publication.
- 1947 – Physikalisch-Technische Bundesanstalt refounded in Braunschweig.
- 1949
  - Abendgymnasium Braunschweig (school) established.
  - Antiquariat am Burgplatz bookshop in business.
- 1955 – 1 February: Luftfahrt-Bundesamt opens.
- 1960
  - Brunswick Palace demolished.
  - Building of the Weststadt starts.
  - 1 October: Braunschweig Hauptbahnhof opens.
- 1963 – Hochschule für Bildende Künste Braunschweig established.
- 1971 – Fachhochschule Braunschweig/Wolfenbüttel established.
- 1972 – Braunschweiger Verkehrs-AG (public transit entity) active.
- 1974 – 28 February: District of Braunschweig disestablished and its main part incorporated into the city of Braunschweig.
- 1975 – Population: 269,900.
- 1976 – Gerhard Glogowski becomes mayor.
- 1977 – Federal Agricultural Research Centre established.
- 1982 – Gerstäcker-Museum established.
- 1987 – Deutsche Sammlung von Mikroorganismen und Zellkulturen moves to Braunschweig.
- 1988 – Braunschweig Classix Festival established.
- 1991–94 – Reconstruction of Alte Waage.
- 1994 – Sparkassen Open tennis tournament established.
- 1998 – 1 September: German Federal Bureau of Aircraft Accident Investigation established.
- 2000
  - Wilhelm Raabe Literature Prize established.
  - 20 September: Volkswagen Halle opens.

== 21st century ==
- 2001 – Happy Rizzi House built in the Ackerhof.
- 2006 – 6 December: Synagoge (Braunschweig) opens.
- 2007 – 6 May: Rebuilt Brunswick Palace opens.
- 2010 – RegioStadtBahn Braunschweig light rail project cancelled.
- 2013 – Population: 247,227.
- 2014 – Ulrich Markurth becomes mayor.

== Images ==
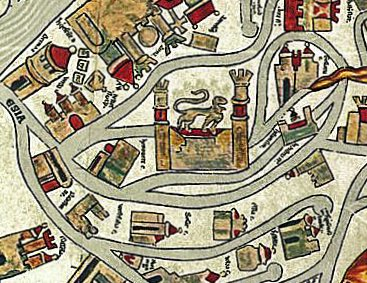
Braunschweig on the Ebstorf Map, circa 1300

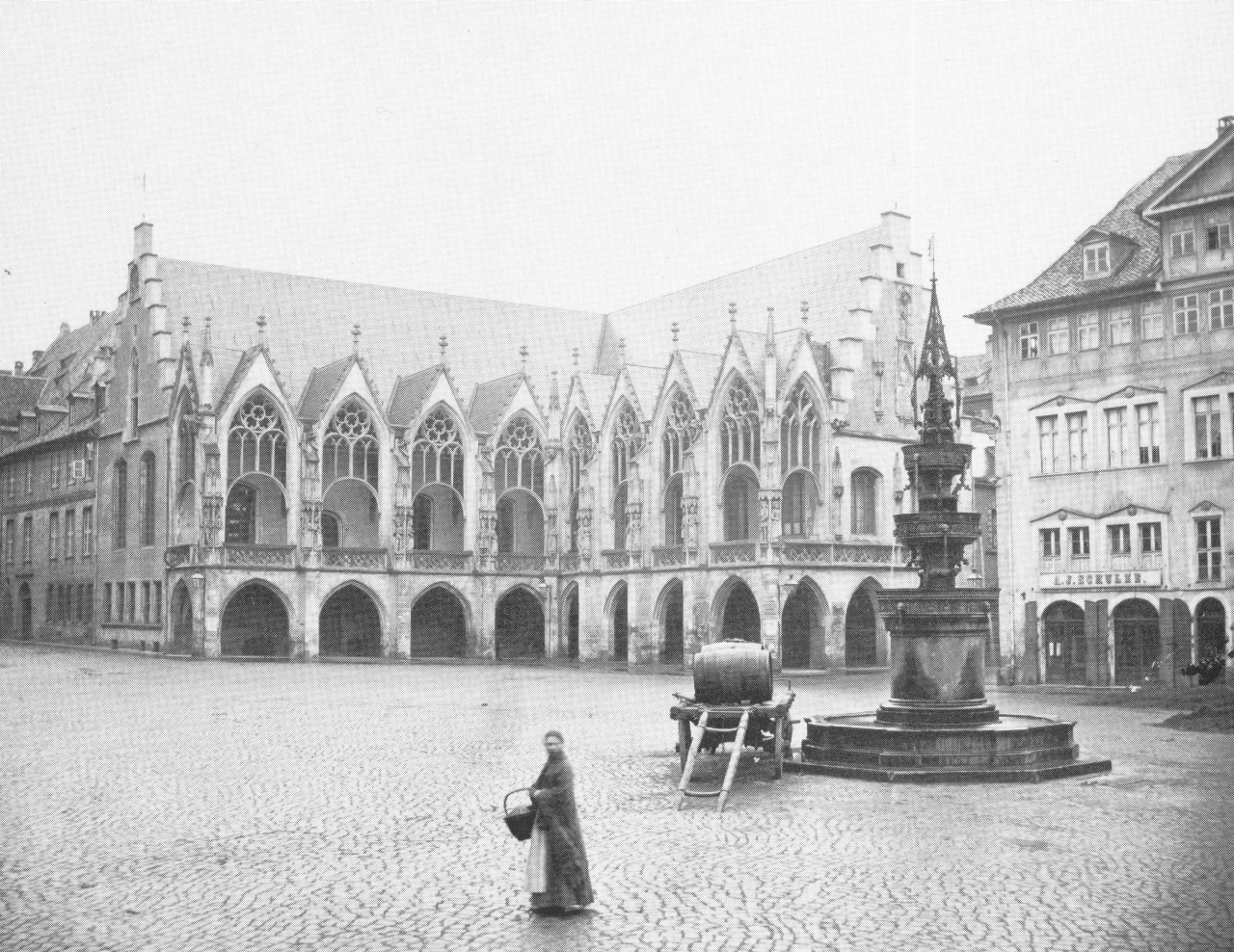
City Hall and fountain, installed 1408 (photo circa 1865)

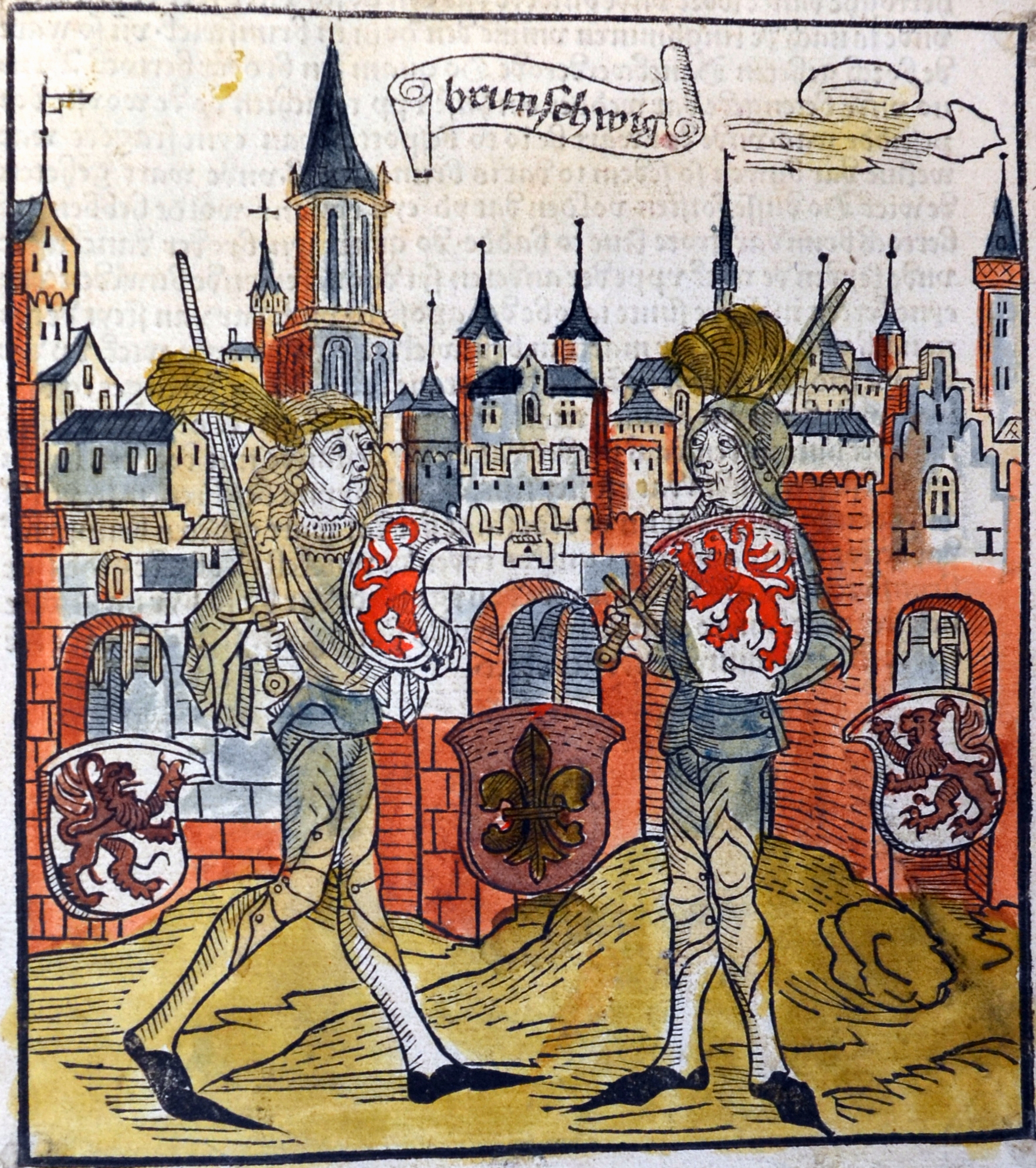
Braunschweig in 1492

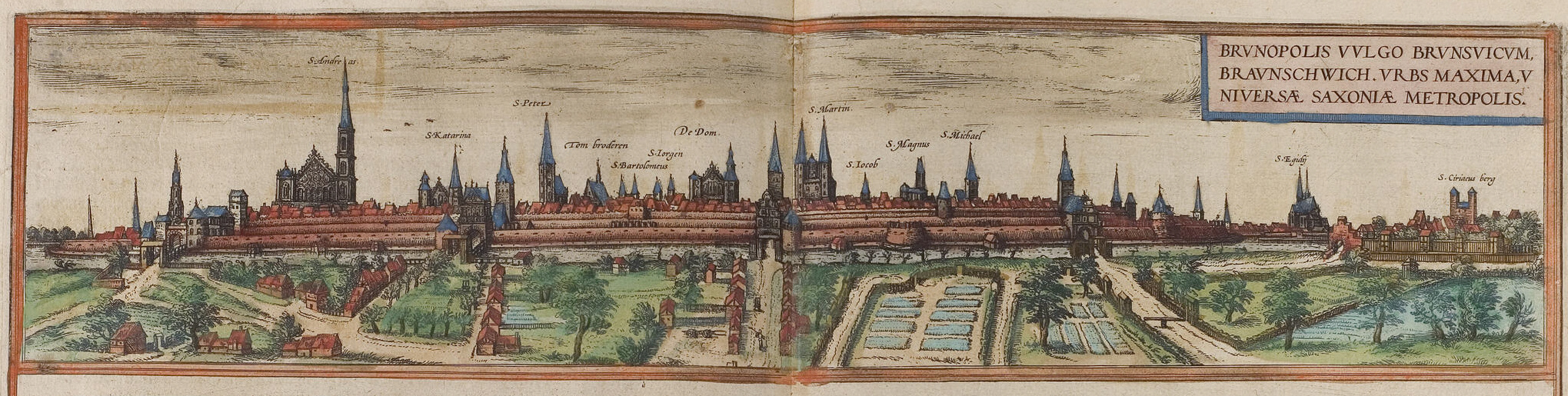
Braunschweig in the 16th century, from the Civitates orbis terrarum by Georg Braun and Frans Hogenberg.

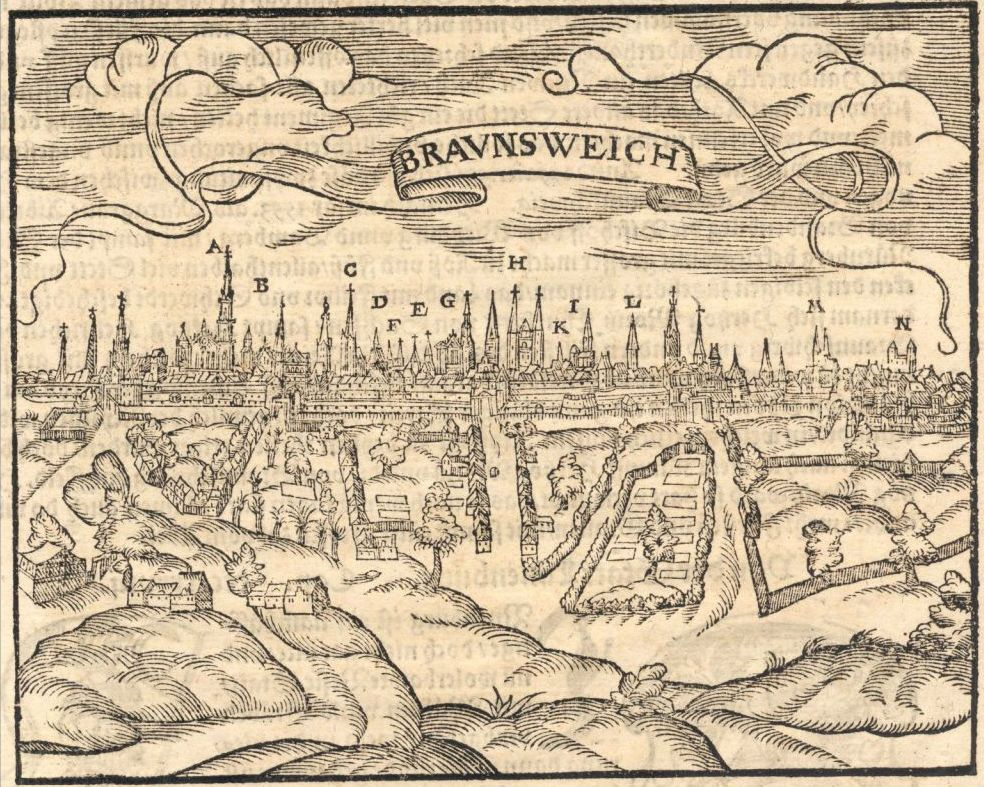
Braunschweig in 1550.

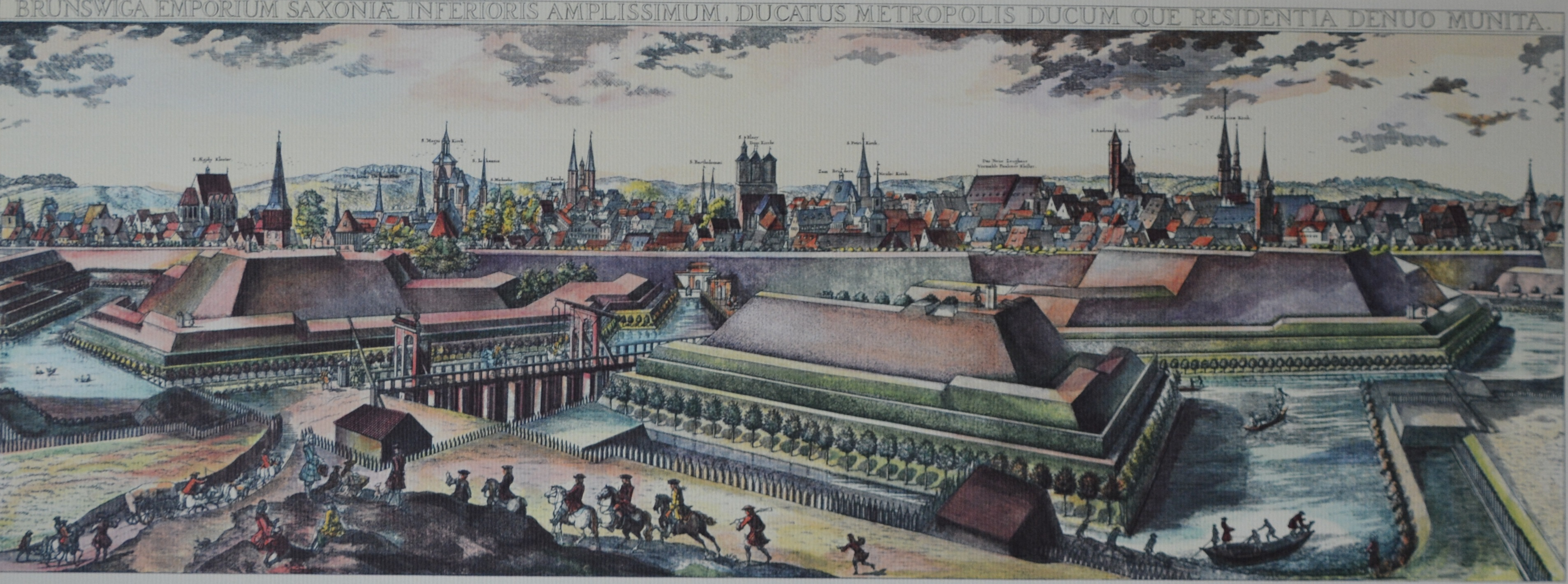
Braunschweig in 1610.

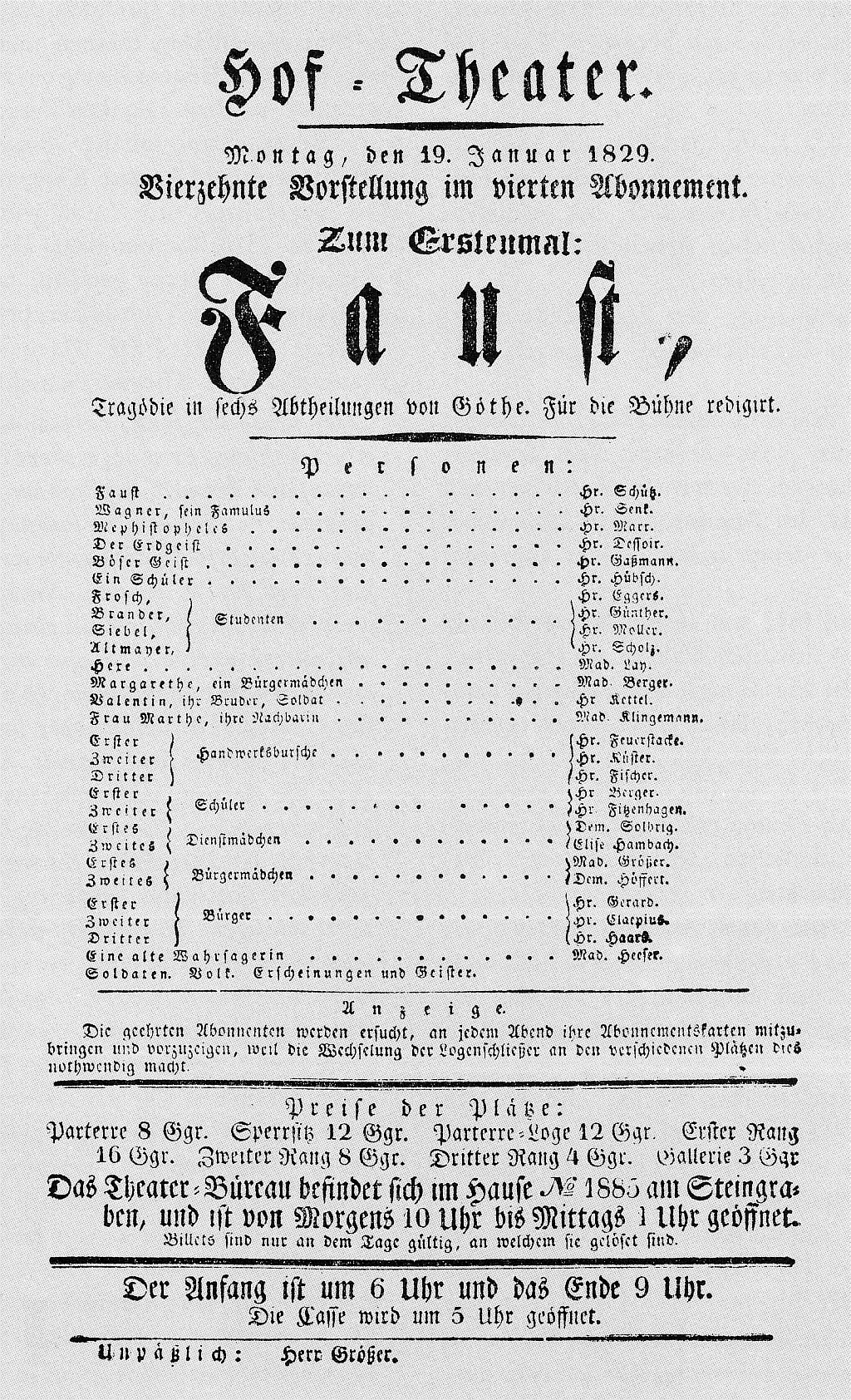
Programme for premiere of Goethe's Faust, 1829

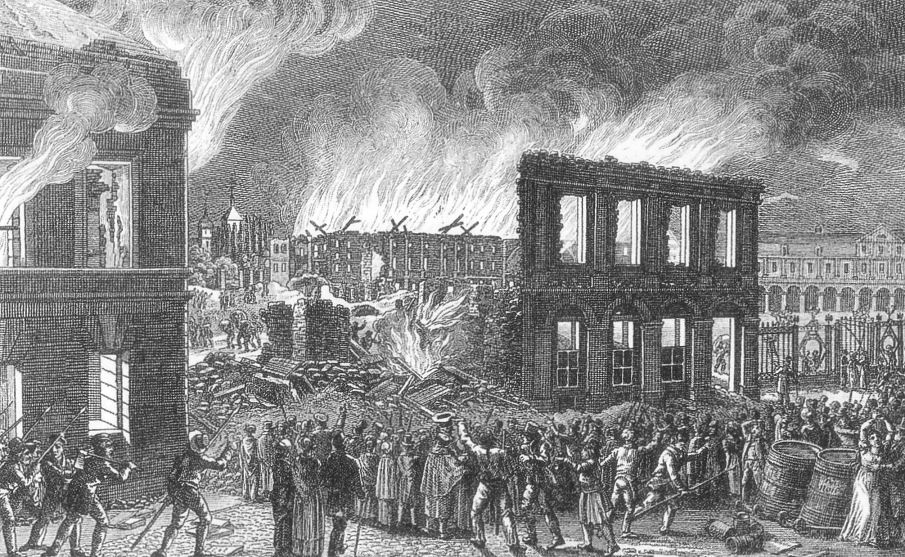
Brunswick Palace set on fire, 7 September 1830

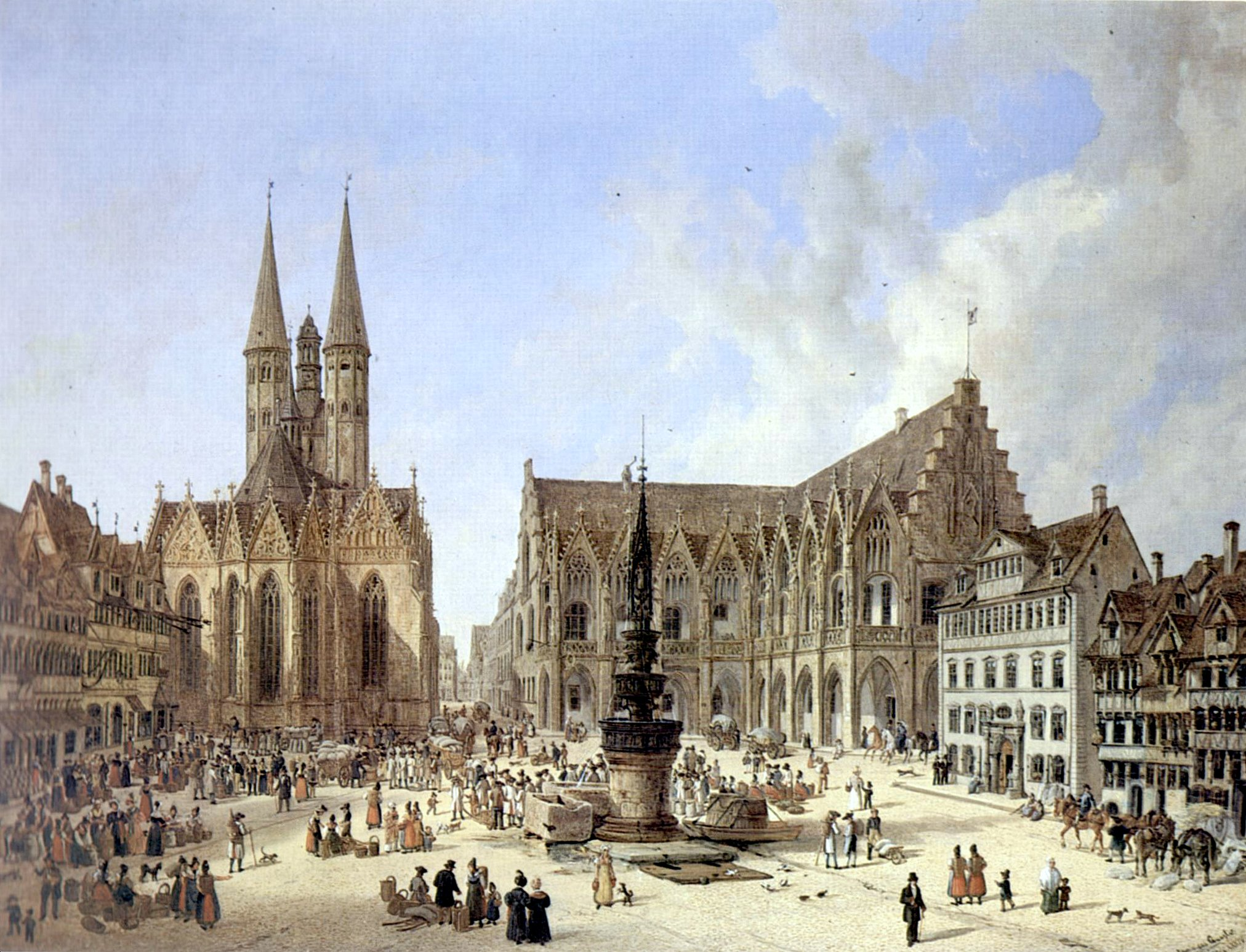
Altstadtmarkt in 1834, by Domenico Quaglio the Younger.

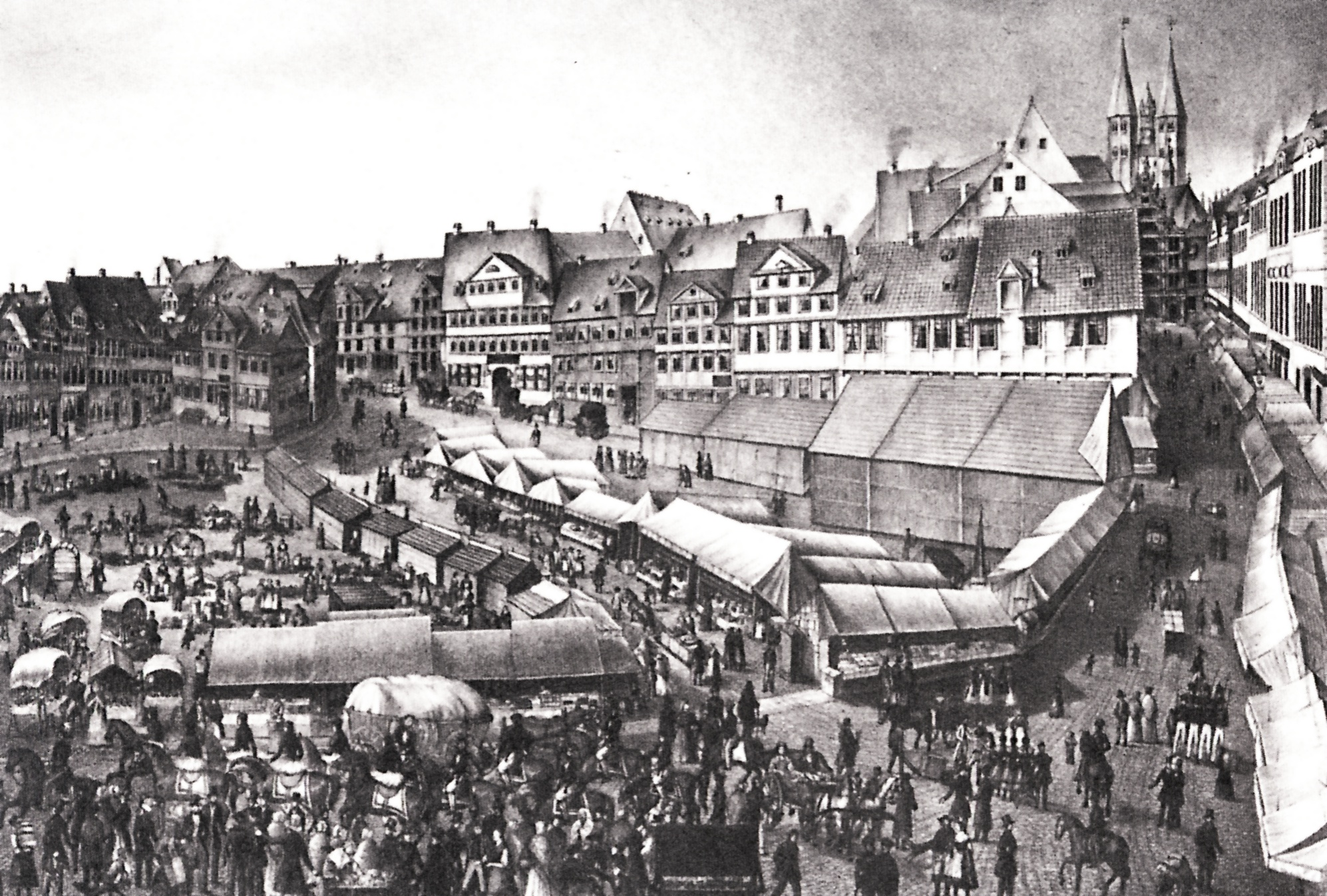
Fair in 1840.

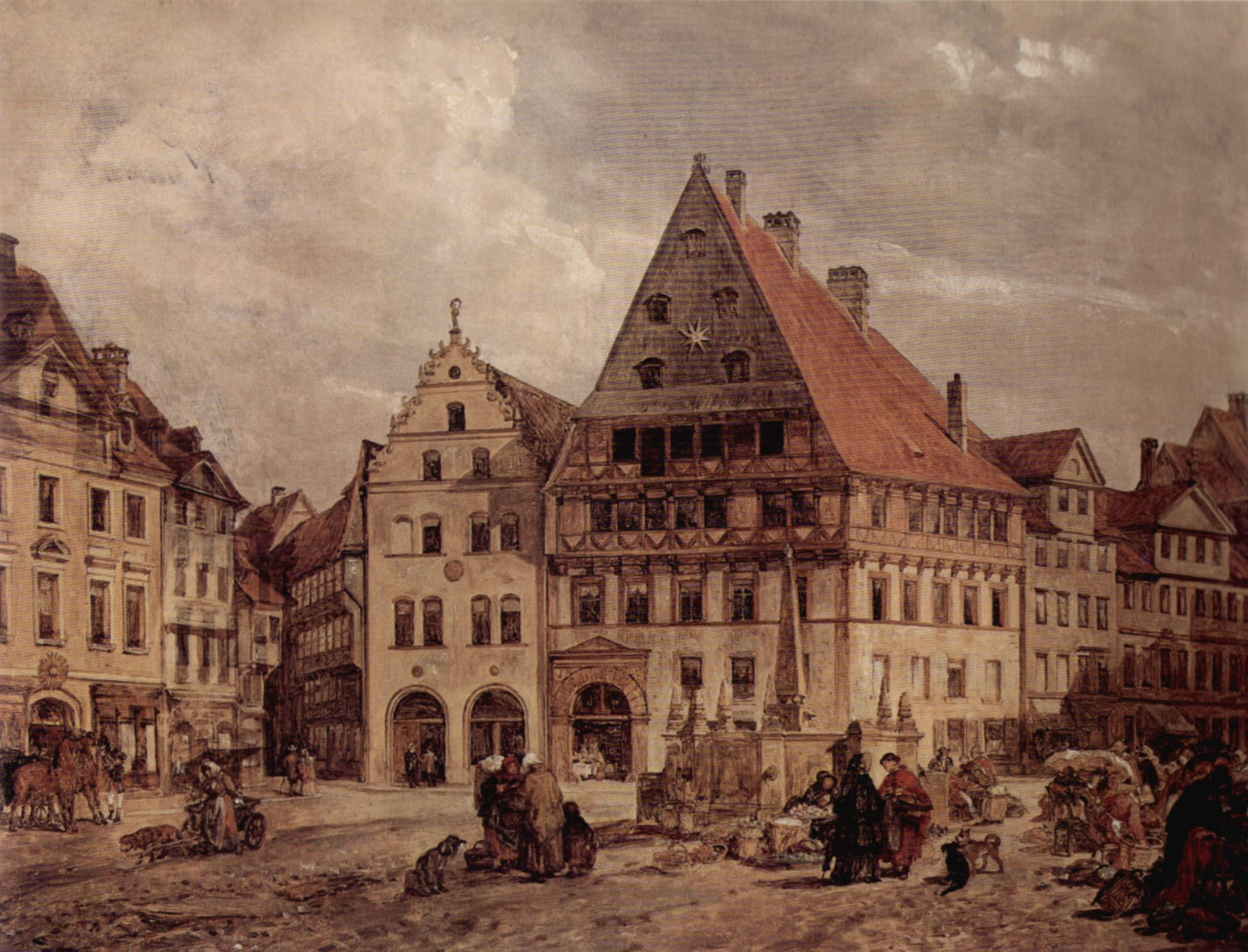
Kohlmarkt in 1894.

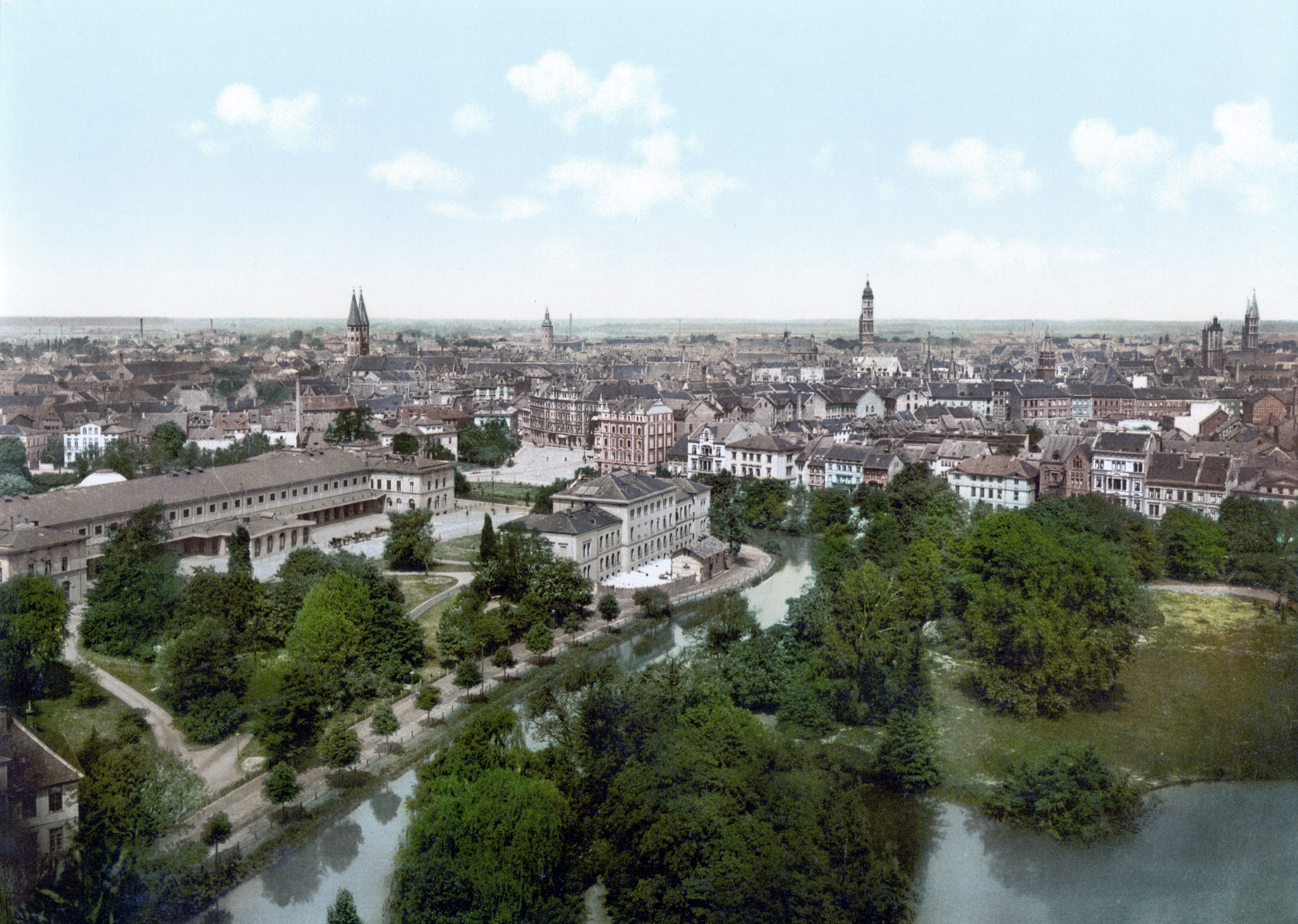
Braunschweig around 1900.

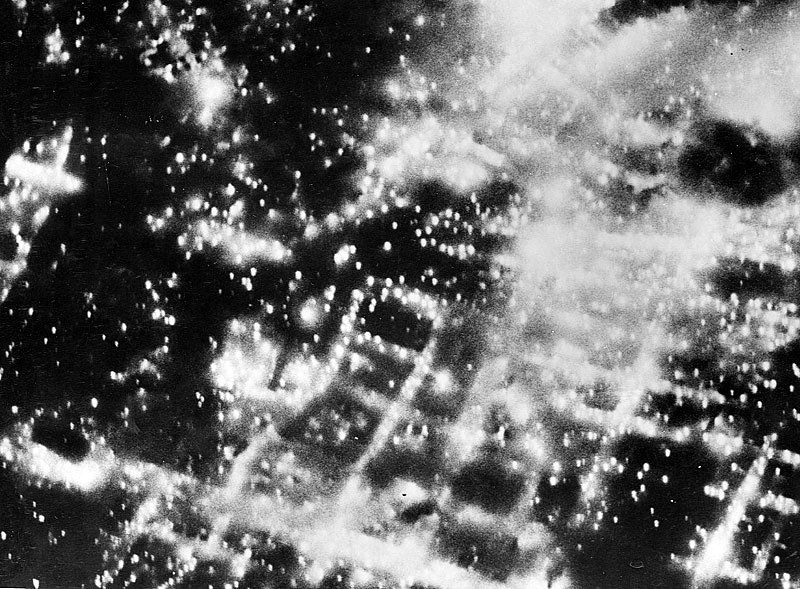
Braunschweig on the night of 15 October 1944

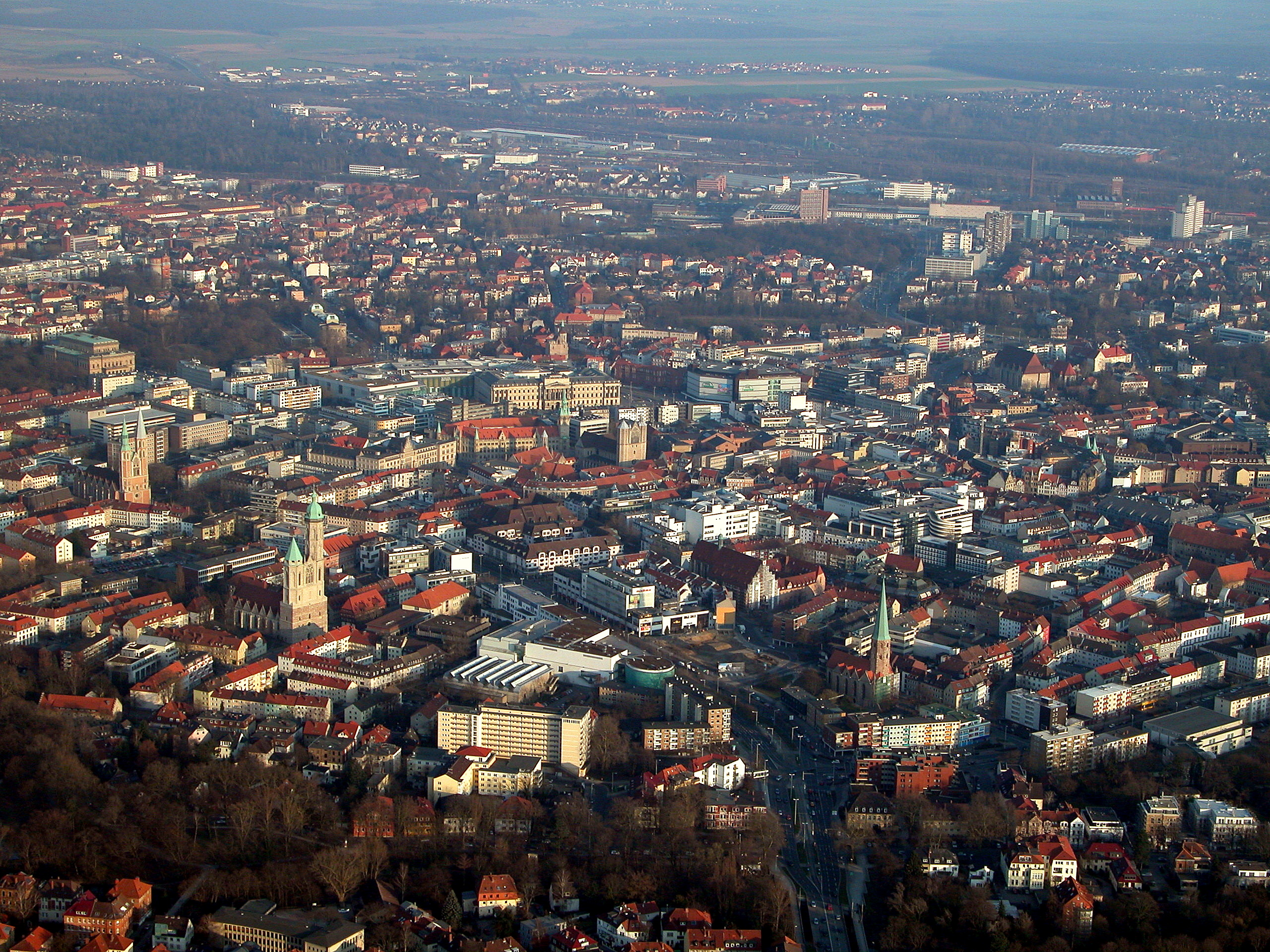
Braunschweig in 2011.

== See also ==
- Braunschweig history
- History of Braunschweig
- List of mayors of Braunschweig

Other cities in the state of Lower Saxony:^{(de)}

- Timeline of Hanover

== Bibliography ==
=== in English ===
- Abraham Rees (1819), "Brunswick", The Cyclopaedia, London: Longman, Hurst, Rees, Orme & Brown, hdl:2027/uc2.ark:/13960/t4vh5t74q
- Edward Augustus Domeier (1830), "Brunswick", Descriptive Road-Book of Germany, London: Samuel Leigh, hdl:2027/hvd.hx167e
- William Henry Overall, ed. (1870). "Brunswick". Dictionary of Chronology. London: William Tegg. hdl:2027/uc2.ark:/13960/t9m32q949.
- "Brunswick", Northern Germany (15th ed.), Leipzig: Karl Baedeker, 1910, OCLC 78390379
- "Brunswick (German city)" . Encyclopædia Britannica. Vol. 4 (11th ed.). 1910. p. 690.
- John M. Jeep, ed. (2001). "Braunschweig". Medieval Germany: an Encyclopedia. Garland Publishing. ISBN 0-8240-7644-3.

=== in German ===
- "Braunschweig: Die Stadt". Biblioteca geographica: Verzeichniss der seit der Mitte des vorigen Jahrhunderts bis zu Ende des Jahres 1856 in Deutschland (in German). Leipzig: Wilhelm Engelmann. 1858 – via Google Books. (bibliography)
- Braunschweig. Die Chroniken der Deutschen Städte (in German). Vol. 6, 16, 35. Leipzig: S. Hirzel Verlag. 1868–1928 – via HathiTrust.
- Hermann Adalbert Daniel [in German] (1878). "Das Herzogthum Braunschweig". Handbuch der Geographie (in German) (5th ed.). Leipzig: Fues's Verlag.
- Karl von Hegel (1891). "Braunschweig". Städte und Gilden der germanischen Völker im Mittelalter (in German). Vol. 2. Leipzig: Duncker & Humblot. hdl:2027/wu.89094689700 – via HathiTrust.
- "Braunschweig". Brockhaus' Konversations-Lexikon (in German) (14th ed.). Leipzig: Brockhaus. 1896. hdl:2027/njp.32101064064452.
- P. Krauss und E. Uetrecht, ed. (1913). "Braunschweig". Meyers Deutscher Städteatlas [Meyer's Atlas of German Cities] (in German). Leipzig: Bibliographisches Institut.
- Rother, Bernd (1990). Die Sozialdemokratie im Land Braunschweig 1918 bis 1933 (in German). Bonn: Verlag J. H. W. Dietz Nachf. ISBN 3-8012-4016-9.
- Braunschweiger Stadtlexikon (in German), 1992
