= Timeline of Hanover =

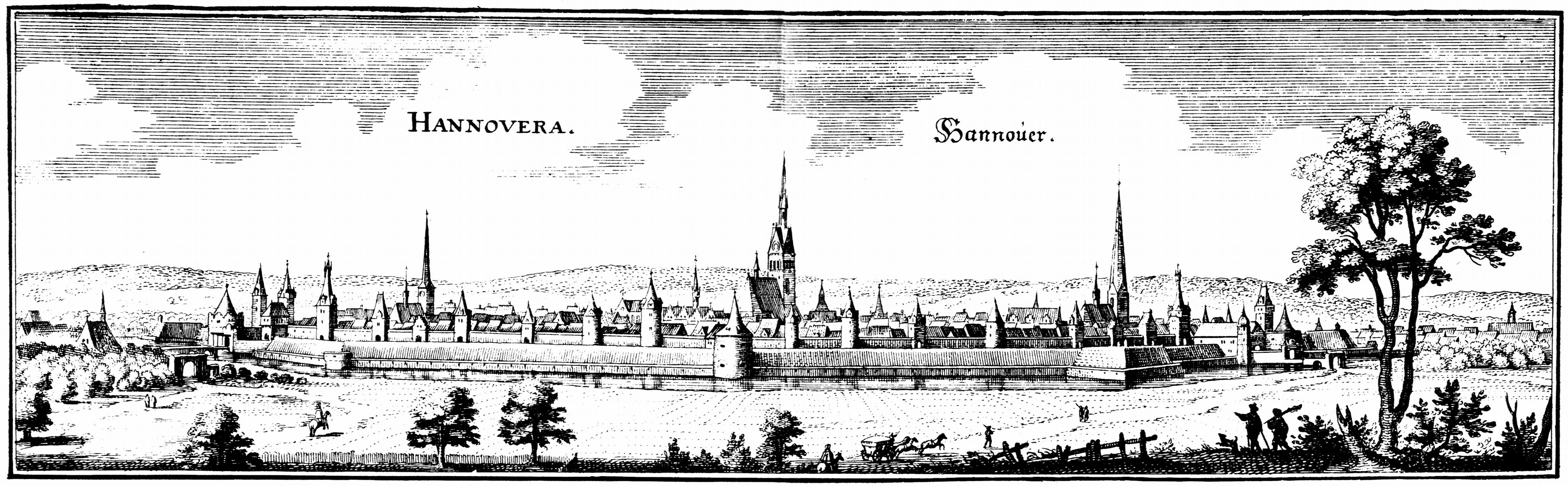
Hanover in the 1640s

The following is a timeline of the history of the city of Hanover, Germany.

== Prior to 19th century ==
- 1333 - Kreuzkirche (church) consecrated.
- 1347 - Aegidienkirche (church) built.
- 1366 - Marktkirche (church) built.
- 1369 - Welfs in power.
- 1382 - Döhrener Tower built near city.
- 1400 - Public clock installed (approximate date).
- 1410 - Town Hall building expanded (approximate date).^{(de)}
- 1440 - Stadtbibliothek Hannover (library) founded.
- 1529 - Hanover Schützenfest established.
- 1550 - Alter Jüdischer Friedhof an der Oberstraße (cemetery) established.
- 1670 - Neustädter Kirche (church) built.
- 1676 - Herrenhausen Palace expansion begins.
- 1689
  - Population: 11,373.
  - Schlossopernhaus opens with premiere of Steffani's opera Henrico Leone.
- 1698 - Leibniz house in use.

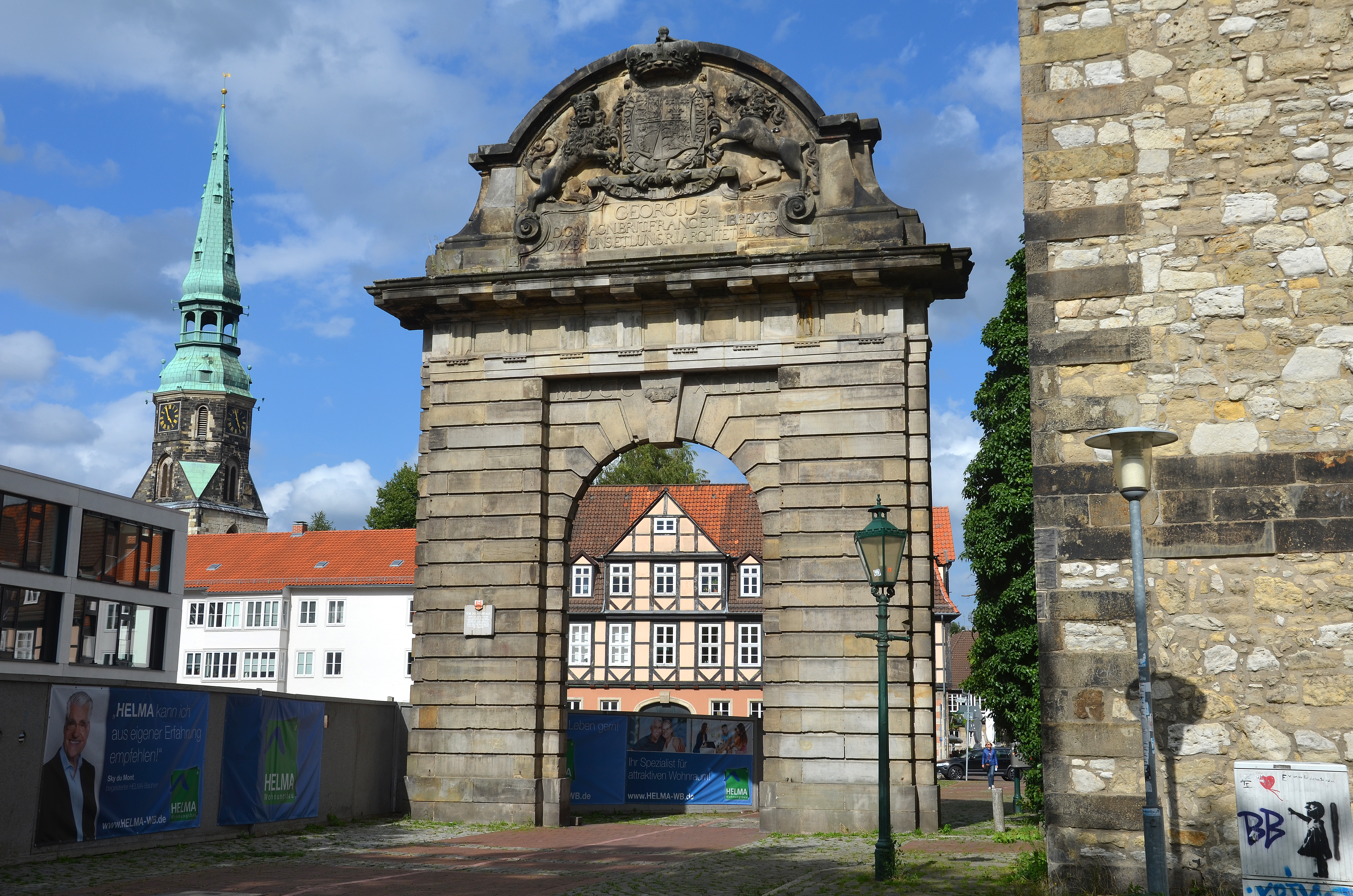
Marstall Gate decorated with a bas-relief with the 18th-century coat of arms of Great Britain

- 1720 - Royal Public Library active.
- 1726 - Herrenhäuser Allee laid out.
- 1755 - Population: 17,432.
- 1797 - Hanover Natural History Society founded.
- 1798 - Adressbuch der Stadt Hannover (city directory) begins publication.

== 19th century ==
- 1810 - Hanover becomes part of the Kingdom of Westphalia.
- 1815 - City becomes capital of the Kingdom of Hanover.
- 1821 - Population: 33,255.
- 1824 - Calenberger Neustadt becomes part of city.
- 1826 - Gas lighting installed.
- 1832 - Kunstverein Hannover (art society) formed.
- 1835 - Historischer Verein für Niedersachsen (historical society) founded.
- 1838 - Artilleriekaserne am Steintor (military barracks) built.
- 1844 - Hanover–Braunschweig Railway in operation.
- 1847
  - Bremen–Hanover railway begins operating.
  - Development of Ernst-August-Stadt area begins.
- 1851 - Thalia Society founded.
- 1852
  - Royal Theatre built.
  - Hannoversches Tageblatt newspaper in publication.
- 1853 - Hanoverian Southern Railway begins operating.
- 1854 - Hannoversche Courier newspaper begins publication.
- 1856 - Museum of Art and Science built.
- 1861 - Population: 71,170.
- 1864
  - Hanover–Hamburg railway in operation.
  - Stadtfriedhof Engesohde and Jüdischer Friedhof An der Strangriede (cemeteries) established.
- 1865 - Hanover Zoo established.
- 1866
  - Hanover becomes part of Prussia.
  - Hanover Military Riding Institute active.
  - Welfenschloss (palace) built.
  - X Army Corps headquartered in Hanover.
  - Hanover Chamber of Industry and Commerce established.
- 1870 - New Synagogue, Hanover built.
- 1871 - Continental rubber manufacturer in business.
- 1872
  - Horse-drawn tram begins operating.^{(de)}
  - Goethe Bridge built.
- 1879 - Hannover Hauptbahnhof rebuilt.
- 1885 - Population: 139,731.
- 1886 - Cumberlandsche Galerie built.
- 1888 - Photographischer Verein founded.
- 1889
  - Mellini-Theater opens.
  - Kestner Museum established.
- 1891 - Hainholz, Herrenhausen, List, and Vahrenwald become part of city.
- 1893
  - Electric tram begins operating.^{(de)}
  - Hannoverscher Anzeiger newspaper begins publication.
- 1895 - Lister Tower and Flusswasserkunst built.
- 1896
  - Hannover 96 football club formed.
  - Holzmarkt Fountain installed.
- 1897 - Music Conservatory established.
- 1898 - Hannoversche Waggonfabrik (manufacturer) in business.

== 20th century ==
=== 1900-1945 ===
- 1902 - Provincial museum built.
- 1903 - Vaterländisches Museum opens.
- 1904 - Bismarck Tower erected.
- 1907 - Bothfeld, Groß-Buchholz, Klein-Buchholz, Döhren, Kirchrode, Mecklenheide, Stöcken, and Wülfel become part of city.
- 1908 - Anti-noise society formed.
- 1911 - Schauburg (theatre) opens.
- 1913 - New City Hall built in the Maschpark.
- 1914
  - Stadthalle built.^{(de)}
  - Stadtpark (Hannover) opens.
- 1916
  - Kestnergesellschaft (modern art society) formed.
  - Duve-Brunnen (fountain) installed in the Neustädter Markt.
- 1918
  - November: German Revolution of 1918–19.
  - Robert Leinert becomes mayor.
- 1919
  - Deutsche Luft-Reederei begins operating its Berlin-Hannover airplane route.
  - Population: 310,431.
- 1920
  - Linden becomes part of city.
  - Hanover Cavalry School established.
- 1921
  - Nazi Party branch established.
  - Überlandwerke und Straßenbahnen Hannover AG (public transit entity) active.
  - Hindenburg Villa in use.
- 1923
  - German Völkisch Freedom Party branch established.
  - Nazi Niedersächsischer Beobachter weekly newspaper begins publication.
- 1924 - Gustav Fink becomes mayor.
- 1925
  - Arthur Menge becomes mayor.
  - Population: 422,745.
- 1927 - Botanischer Schulgarten Burg (garden) established.
- 1936 - Maschsee (lake) created.
- 1937 - Henricus Haltenhoff becomes mayor.
- 1938 - November: Kristallnacht pogrom against Jews.
- 1939
  - September: Bombing of Hanover in World War II by Allied forces begins.
  - Population: 472,527.
- 1942 - Ludwig Hoffmeister becomes Staatskommissare.^{(de)}
- 1944
  - 24 June: Hanover-Limmer concentration camp begins operating.
  - 26 June: Hanover-Misburg subcamp of the Neuengamme concentration camp established. The prisoners were mostly Polish women.
  - 1 September: Hanover-Limmer concentration camp redesignated a subcamp of the Neuengamme concentration camp.
  - September: Hanover-Stöcken (Continental) concentration camp begins operating.
  - Late September or early October: Hanover-Langenhagen subcamp of Neuengamme established. The prisoners were mostly Polish women.
  - November: Hanover-Ahlem concentration camp established.
  - Egon Bönner becomes Staatskommissare.^{(de)}

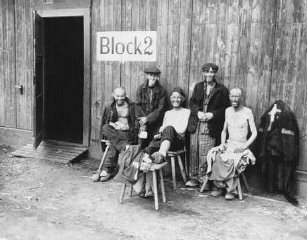
Survivors of the Hanover-Ahlem concentration camp following liberation

- 1945
  - January: Hanover-Langenhagen subcamp of Neuengamme dissolved, surviving prisoners relocated to the Hanover-Limmer camp.
  - February: Hanover-Mühlenberg concentration camp begins operating.
  - 6 April: Hanover-Limmer and Hanover-Misburg subcamps of Neuengamme dissolved, surviving prisoners sent on a death march.
  - 10 April: Allied forces arrive.
  - April–May: Mayor, Regierungspräsident, and Oberpräsident (local government officials) appointed.

=== 1946-1990s ===
- 1946 - February: Flood.^{(de)}
- 1947
  - 1 April: Food protest.
  - Hannover Messe (trade fair) begins.
- 1949
  - Hannoversche Allgemeine Zeitung (newspaper) in publication.
  - Europa-Haus built.
- 1950s - Hannover War Cemetery established.
- 1951 - Youth House built.
- 1952
  - Landesbühne Hannover (theatre) established.
  - Trade union building built.
- 1954
  - Niedersachsenstadion (stadium) opens.
  - Mannesmann Tower erected.
  - Frühlingsfest Hannover begins.
  - Markthalle Hannover rebuilt.
- 1965 - Oktoberfest Hannover begins.
- 1965 - Population: 555,228.
- 1969 - IBM-Haus built.
- 1970 - Norddeutsche Landesbank headquartered in city.
- 1972 - Herbert Schmalstieg becomes mayor.
- 1974 - Ahelm, Anderten, Bemerode, Misburg, Vinnhorst, Wettbergen, and Wülferode become part of city.
- 1975
  - Hanover Stadtbahn begins operating.
  - Eilenriedehalle built in the Hannover Congress Centrum.
- 1979 - Sprengel Museum opens.
- 1987 - Klecks-Theater Hannover founded.
- 1991 - Hanover–Würzburg high-speed railway built.
- 1992 - Hanover City Archive moves to Bokemahle in Südstadt-Bult.
- 2000
  - June: Expo 2000 opens.
  - Hanover S-Bahn commuter rail begins operating.

== 21st century ==
- 2001 - Gehry Tower built.
- 2002 - Nord/LB headquarters built.
- 2005 - Regional Lower Saxony State Archives established, including its Hanover office.
- 2006 - Stephan Weil (SPD) becomes mayor.
- 2008
  - Hannover City 2020 + urban planning process begins.
  - Baitus Sami Mosque built.
- 2013 - Stefan Schostok becomes mayor.
- 2014 - Population: 523,642.
- 2019 - Belit Onay (Greens) becomes mayor.

== Images ==
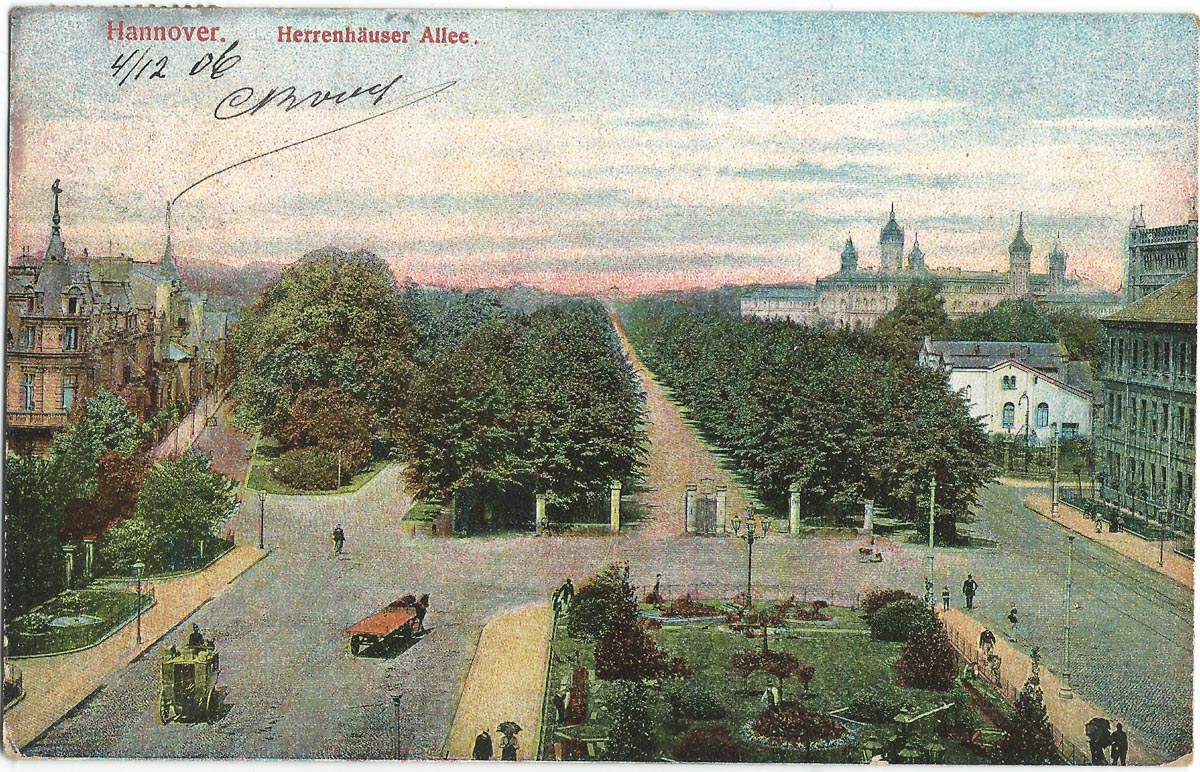
Herrenhäuser Allee, laid out in 1726 (postcard from 1906)

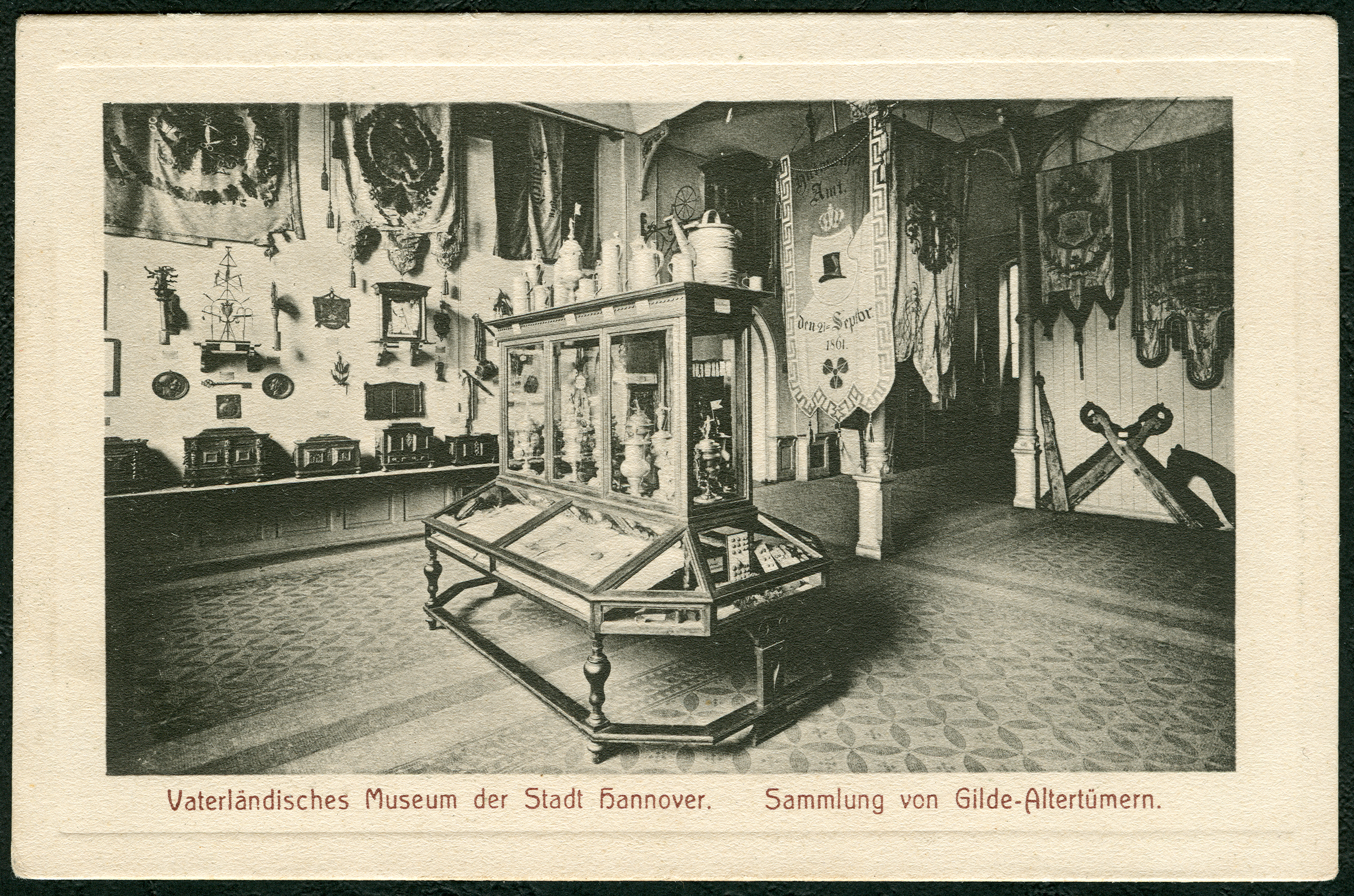
Vaterländisches Museum, opened in 1903

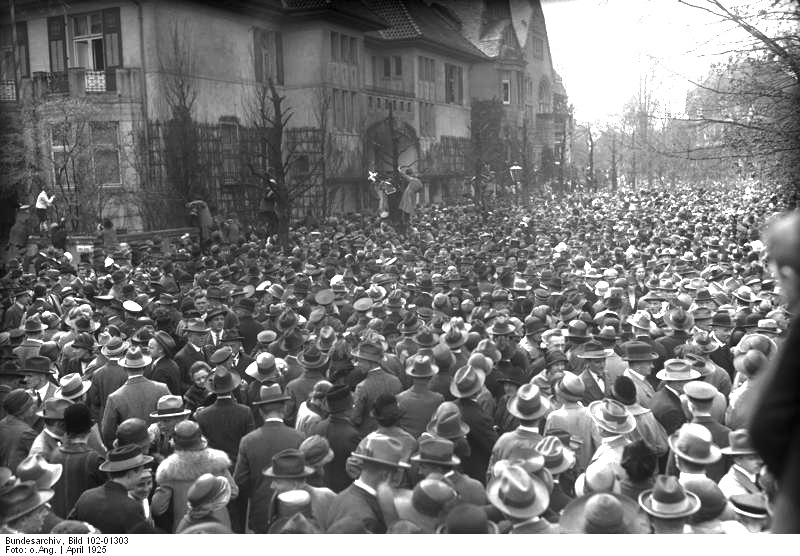
Crowd outside house of Hindenburg on day he becomes President of Germany, 12 May 1925

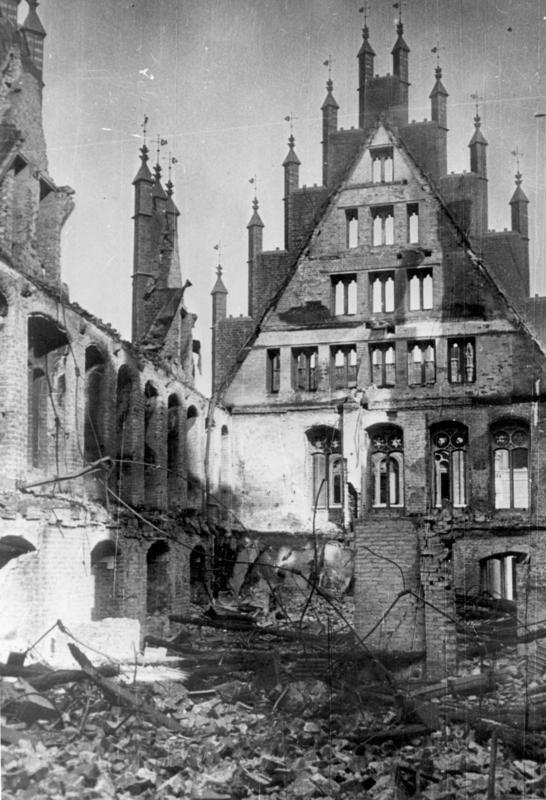
Bombed wreckage of Old Town Hall, 1943

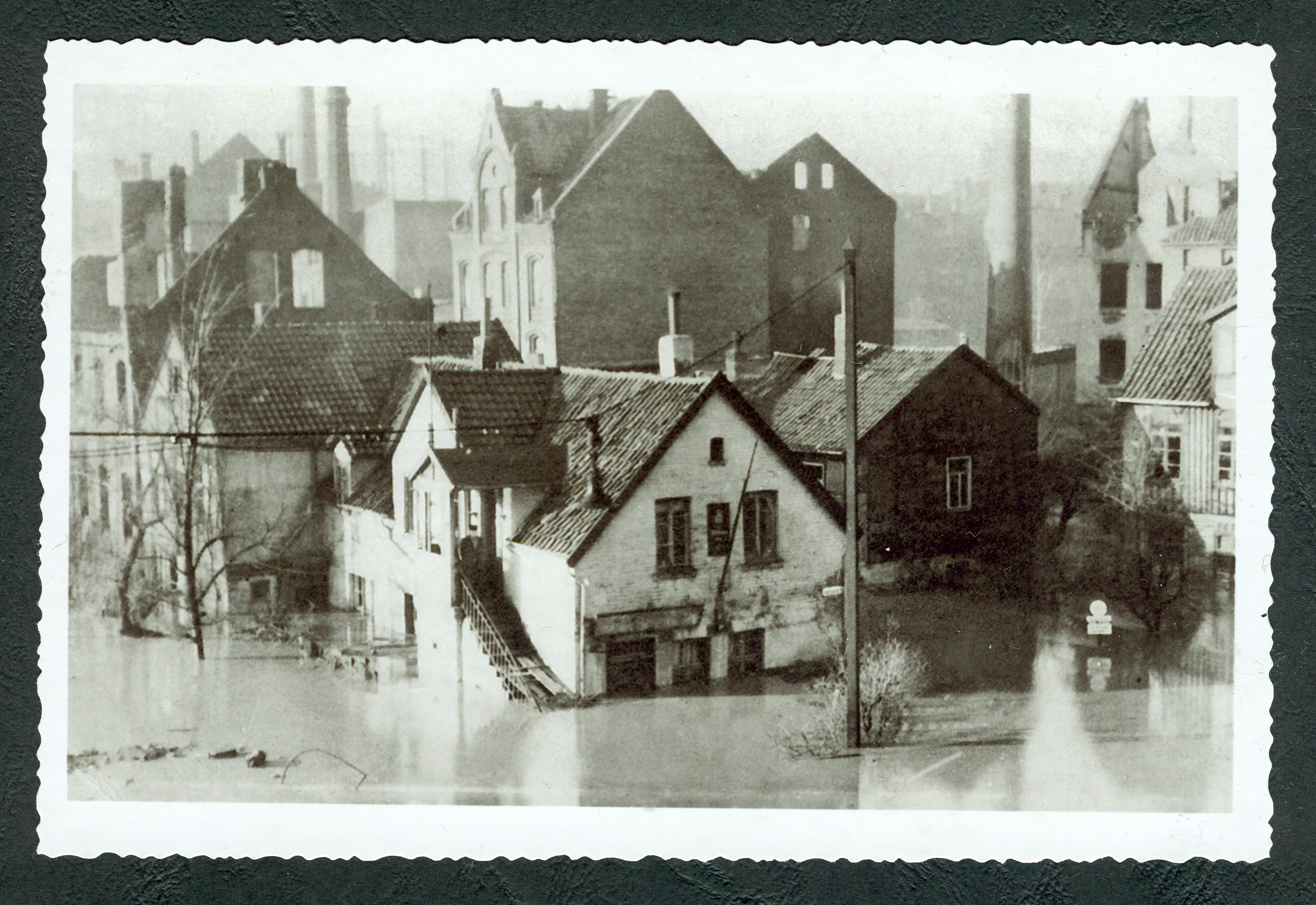
Flood, 1946

== See also ==
- Hanover history
- History of Hanover (city)
- History of Hanover (region)
- History of the Jews in Hannover
- List of mayors of Hanover
- Maps of Hanover
- List of former buildings in Hanover

Other cities in the state of Lower Saxony:^{(de)}

- Timeline of Braunschweig

== Bibliography ==
=== in English ===
- Abraham Rees (1819), "Hanover", The Cyclopaedia, London: Longman, Hurst, Rees, Orme & Brown, hdl:2027/mdp.39015057241179
- Edward Augustus Domeier (1830), "Hanover", Descriptive Road-Book of Germany, London: Samuel Leigh, hdl:2027/hvd.hx167e
- "Hanover". Handbook for North Germany. Murray's hand-book Rhine & North Germany. London: J. Murray. 1886. hdl:2027/hvd.hn1imr.
- "Hanover". Chambers's Encyclopaedia. London. 1901. hdl:2027/uc2.ark:/13960/t1fj2r624.
- "Hanover", Northern Germany (15th ed.), Leipzig: Karl Baedeker, 1910, OCLC 78390379 + 1873 ed.
- "Hanover (city)" . Encyclopædia Britannica. Vol. 12 (11th ed.). 1910. pp. 926–927.
- Robert E Dickinson (1951). "Structure of the German City: Hanover". West European City: a Geographical Interpretation. Routledge. ISBN 978-1-136-25970-8.
- John Farquharson (1973), "The NSDAP in Hanover and Lower Saxony 1921-26", Journal of Contemporary History, 8 (4): 103–120, doi:10.1177/002200947300800406, JSTOR 260130, S2CID 159784977
- Barbara Marshall (1986), "Democratization of Local Politics in the British Zone of Germany: Hanover 1945-47", Journal of Contemporary History, 21 (3): 413–451, doi:10.1177/002200948602100304, JSTOR 260436, S2CID 154840068
- Werner Heine & Annette Haxton (1994), "'Futura' without a Future: Kurt Schwitters' Typography for Hanover Town Council, 1929-1934", Journal of Design History, 7 (2): 127–140, doi:10.1093/jdh/7.2.127, JSTOR 1316081

=== in German ===
published in the 19th century

- Hoppe (1845). Geschichte der Stadt Hannover (in German).
- Friedrich Wilhelm Andreae (1859). Chronik der residenzstadt Hannover (in German). Hildesheim: Finckesche Buchhandlung.
- Adressbuch, Stadt- und Geschäfts-Handbuch der königlichen Residenzstadt Hannover (in German). 1872 – via HathiTrust. + 1884 ed.
- Hannoversche Geschichtsblätter (in German). Vereins für die Geschichte der Stadt Hannover. 1898. ongoing
- "Hannover (Stadt)". Brockhaus' Konversations-Lexikon (in German). Vol. 8 (14th ed.). Leipzig: Brockhaus. 1896. hdl:2027/njp.32101064064585.
- Georg Fischer [in German] (1899). Opern und Concerte im Hoftheater zu Hannover bis 1866 (in German). Hanover: Hahn.

published in the 20th century

- Otto Jürgens [in German] (1907). Hannoversche chronik. Veröffentlichung zur niedersächsischen geschichte,6 (in German). Hanover: Geibel. (chronology)
- Verwaltungsbericht des Magistrats der Koniglichen Haupt- und Residenzstadt Hannover, 1906-07 [Management report of the magistrate of the royal residence and capital city of Hanover] (in German). Hanover: Aug. Eberlein & Co. 1908.
- P. Krauss; E. Uetrecht, eds. (1913). "Hannover". Meyers Deutscher Städteatlas [Meyer's Atlas of German Cities] (in German). Leipzig: Bibliographisches Institut.
- Hannover und Hildesheim. Griebens Reiseführer (in German). Vol. 151 (2nd ed.). Berlin: Albert Goldschmidt. 1914 – via HathiTrust.
- Adelheid von Saldern, ed. (1989). Stadt und Moderne: Hannover in der Weimarer Republik (in German). Ergebnisse. ISBN 978-3-925622-51-9.
- Klaus Mlynek; Waldemar R. Röhrbein, eds. (1991). Hannover Chronik (in German). Schlütersche Verlagsgesellschaft. ISBN 978-3-87706-319-4. (chronology)
- Klaus Mlynek; Waldemar R. Röhrbein, eds. (1994). Geschichte der Stadt Hannover (in German). Schlütersche. ISBN 978-3-87706-364-4.
- Friedrich Lindau (2000). Hannover: Wiederaufbau und Zerstörung; die Stadt im Umgang mit ihrer bauhistorischen Identität (in German) (2nd ed.). Schlütersche. ISBN 978-3-87706-659-1.

published in the 21st century

- Hannoversches Biographisches Lexikon (in German). 2002.
- Hannover. Kunst- und Kultur-Lexikon (in German) (4th ed.). 2007.
- Klaus Mlynek; et al., eds. (2009), Stadtlexikon Hannover (in German), Schlütersche, ISBN 9783842682078 – via Google Books^{(de)}
