= Memorial to the murdered Jews of Hanover =

Monument in Hanover, Germany

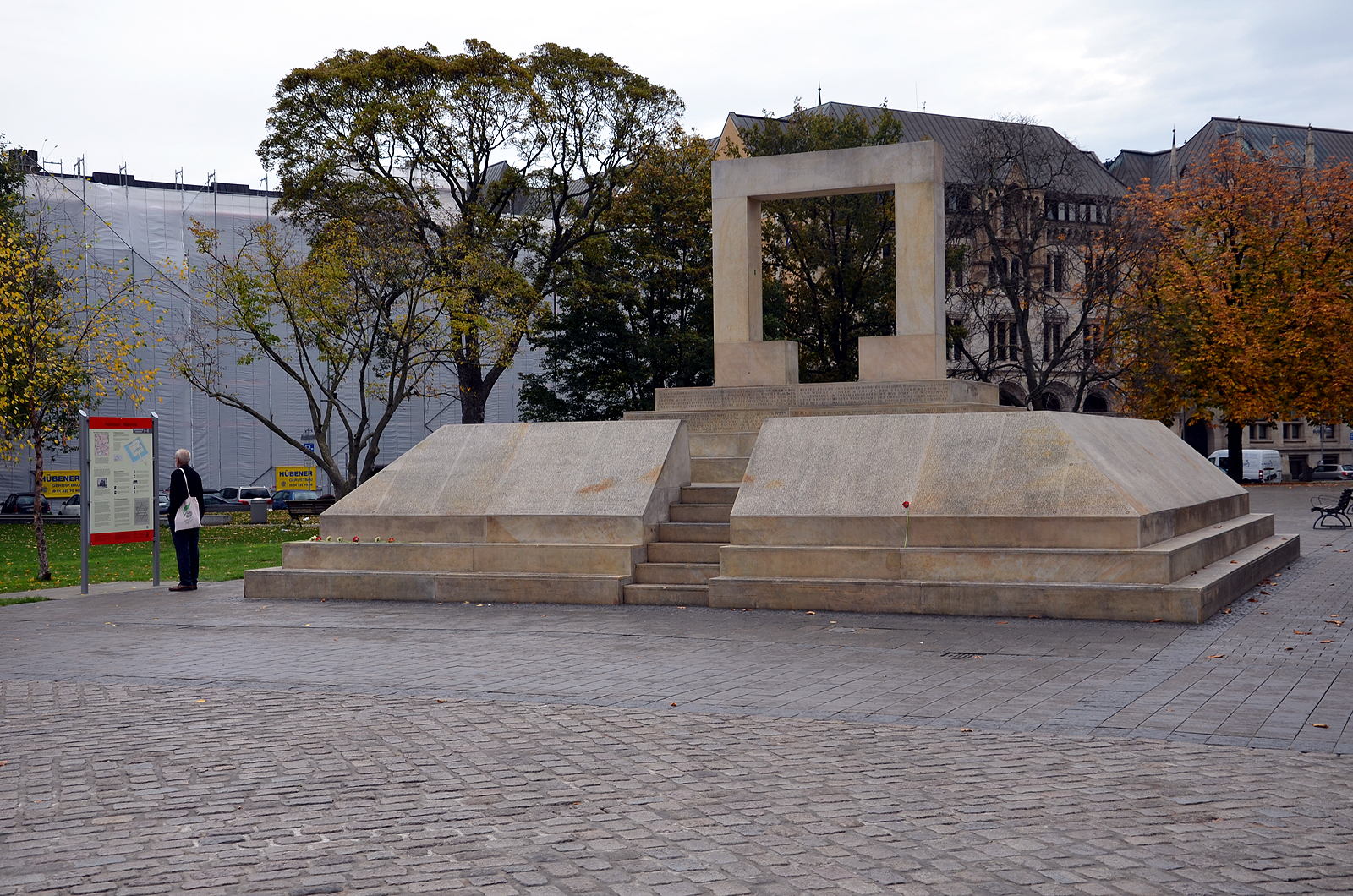
The Memorial to the Murdered Jews of Hanover on the Opernplatz with the information board unveiled in 2013

The Memorial to the Murdered Jews of Hanover is located in Hanover, Germany, on Opernplatz, one of the city's central squares. It was designed by the Italian artist Michelangelo Pistoletto and erected in 1994 on the initiative of the Memoriam Association and financed through individual donations. The memorial is adjacent to Hanover's Opera House and commemorates the more than 6,800 Jews of Hanover who were murdered by the Nazis in the Holocaust. To date, 1,935 names have been carved in stone. Their age at the time of deportation was added to the names of the deportees, for the other victims the birth year was added. As far as is known, the subsequent fate of each individual victim was recorded. If the place of death could not be determined, "missing" was noted, as was customary elsewhere.

== History ==
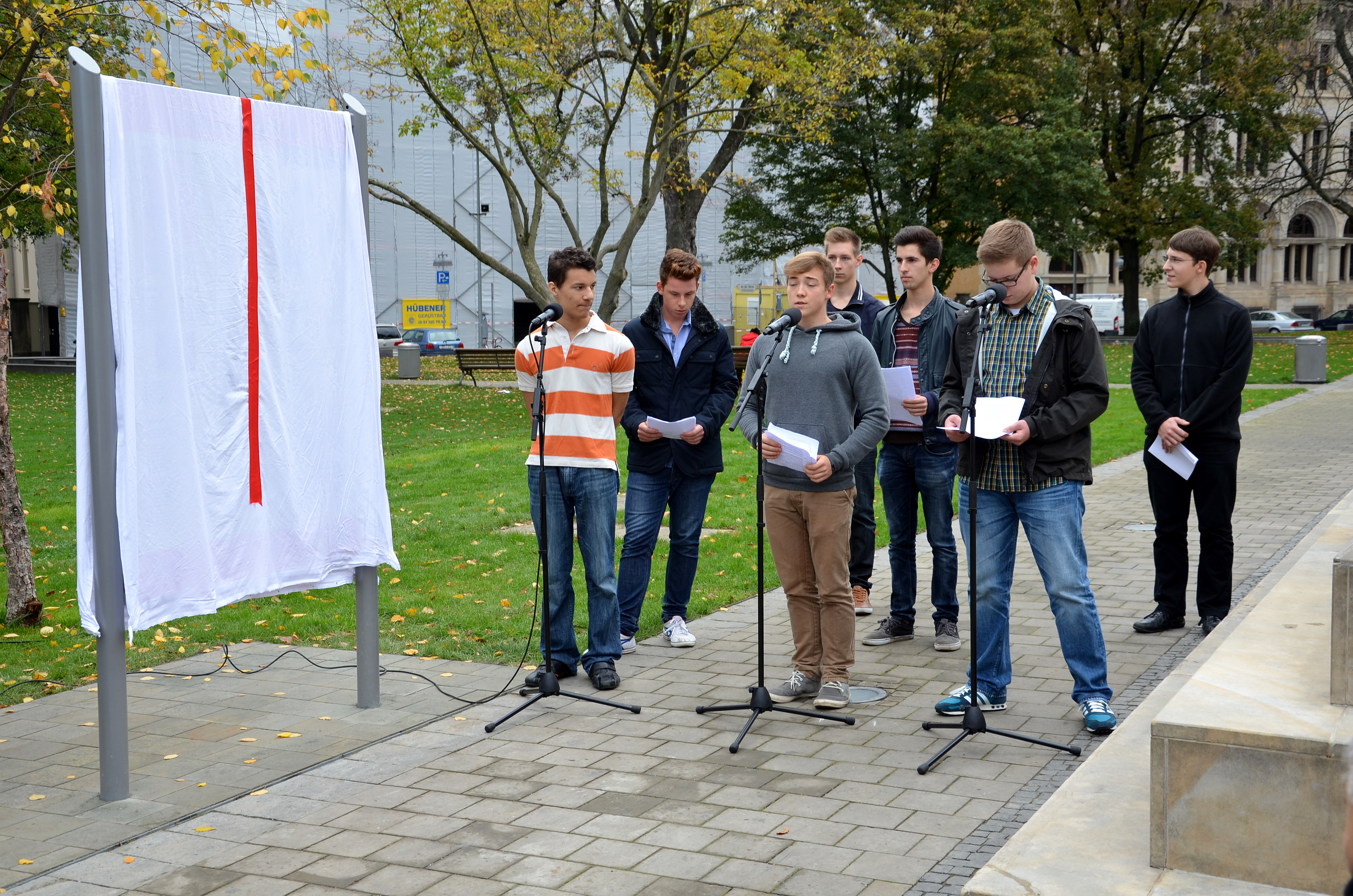
Pupils of the St. Ursula school at the unveiling of the information board

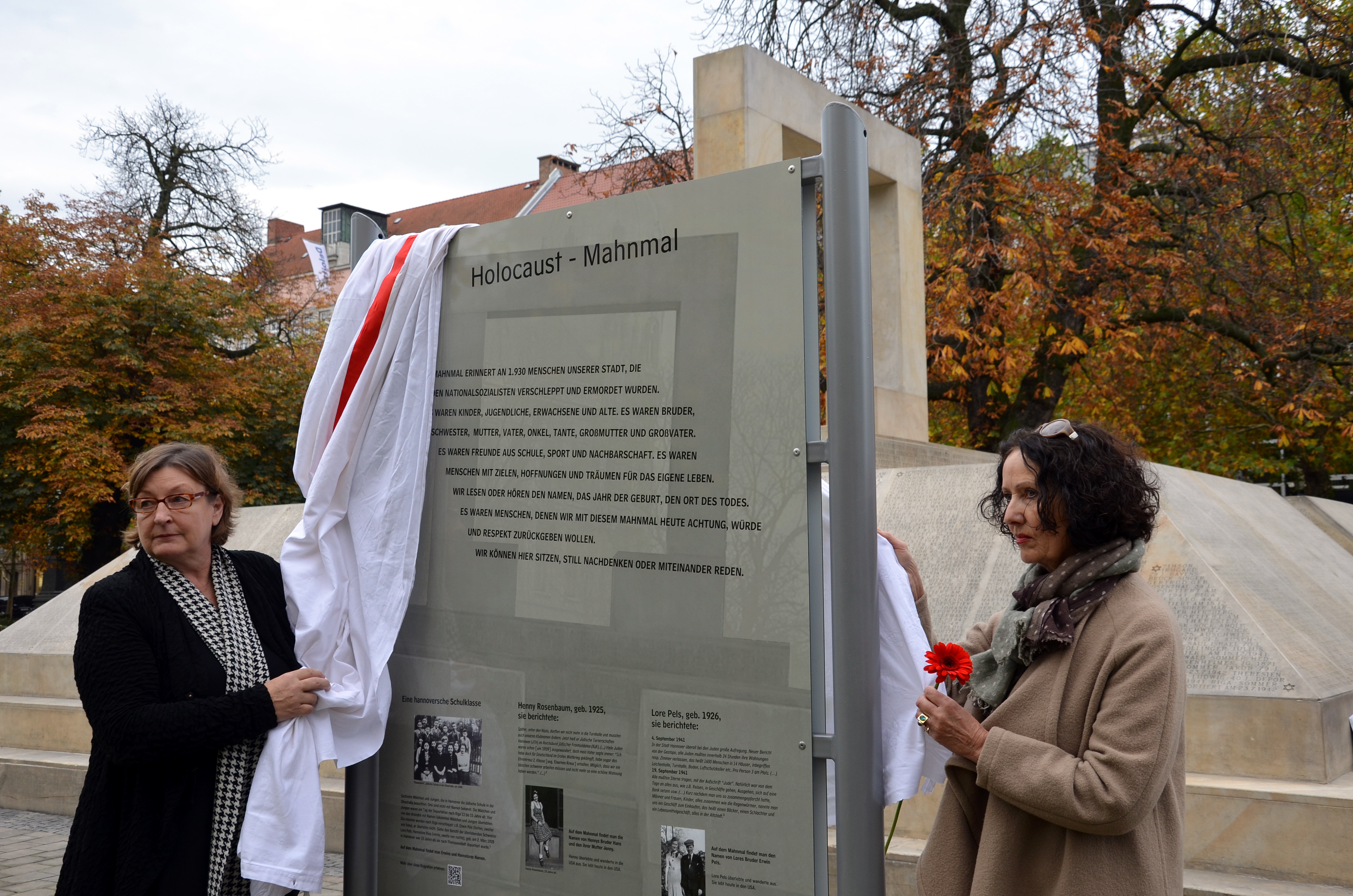
Marlis Drevermann, head of the Culture and Education Department, and Ingrid Wettberg, chairwoman of the Liberal Jewish Community, at the unveiling of the information board

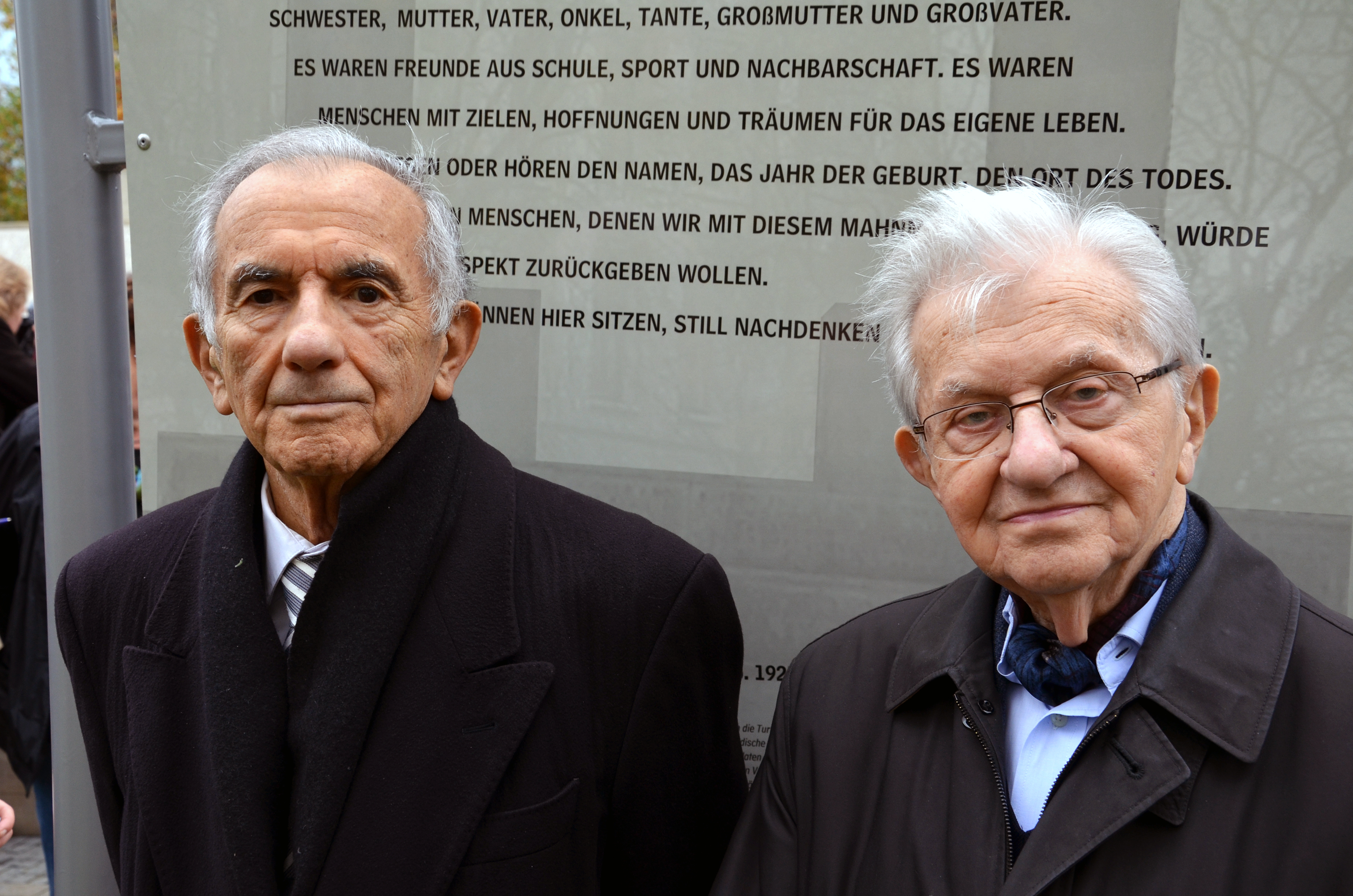
Holocaust survivors: the contemporary witnesses Salomon Finkelstein and Henry Korman

The history of the Jews in Hanover up to the end of Nazi Germany is summarized by a central inscription at the memorial as follows:

"This memorial has been erected in the lasting memory of over 6800 Jews of Hanover: Many families lived here for generations. From 1933 onwards they were humiliated, disenfranchised, chased away, driven to suicide or killed by the Nazis: With the help of the city council the remaining Jewish children, women and men had to vacate their flats in 1941 and were crammed together into "Judenhäuser" (houses for Jews) and then removed from the community, deported and murdered without any significant resistance from the rest of the population. The transports left for Poland on 28 October 1938 for Poland on 25 June 1939, for Riga on 15 December 1941, for Warsaw on 31 March 1942, for Theresienstadt on 23 June 1942, for Auschwitz on 2 March 1943, for Theresienstadt on 16 March 1943, for Theresienstadt on 30 June 1943, for Theresienstadt on 11 January 1944, for Theresienstadt on 20 February 1945. There were only a few survivors in Hanover: 27 were liberated by American soldiers from the Ahlem collective camp on 10 April 1945. The names of the murdered, as far as known today, are recorded on this memorial. Erected 50 years later by one of Hanover’s citizens' initiatives and supported by many citizens and the City of Hanover: Hanover, 9 October 1994."

Before the building was erected, there were years of controversial discussions about the pros and cons of such a monument. Finally, on the initiative of the Memoriam e.V. association, enough private donations came together to be able to hand over the building to the public on 9 October 1994.

On the day of the dedication, State Rabbi Henry Brandt recited the following prayer:

"We commemorate our brothers and sisters of the Jewish community in Hannover who were driven to their deaths by pride, hatred and racial fanaticism during the National Socialist tyranny, or who were scorned or despised and driven from their homeland to foreign lands. We mourn for all that was destroyed with them. Not only their house of worship was reduced to rubble by sacrilegious hands, but also their wisdom, their goodness and their righteousness, which could have saved worlds and healed many wounds, were destroyed. We mourn for their skill and knowledge, for laughter and smiles that were lost with them. The world would become poorer and our heart would freeze if we forgot the glory that could have been. We remember their example with gratitude. They are like lights that shine over to us from the darkness of those years, and in their brilliance we recognize what is good - and what is evil. May such terrible times never return, lest their sacrifice be in vain. By remembering them, we gain strength in our daily struggle against cruelty and prejudice, against tyranny and persecution. Amen."

At the inauguration in 1994 the names of 1,890 victims were known. Due to further research another 25 names could be added in 1997, another 20 in 2004.

In mid-2012, the memorial had been vandalised by unknown people and carelessly soiled with chewing gum. Following a letter from the chairman of the Jewish Community of Lower Saxony, Michael Fürst, to the then Lord Mayor Stephan Weil and an intensive clean-up of the memorial to restore the dignity of the site, a separate information board was erected in 2013, explaining the situation on both sides. During an event organized by the Department of Education and Qualification of the State Capital, Project Remembrance Culture, a memorial was unveiled on 25 October 2013 Ingrid Wettberg, Chairwoman of the Liberal Jewish Community, together with Marlis Drevermann, Head of the Department of Culture and Education, unveiled the board in front of numerous guests from the political, cultural and historical world of the City of Hanover, including Holocaust survivors and contemporary witnesses Salomon Finkelstein and Henry Korman. During the event, pupils of the St. Ursula School recalled the fates of individual Hanoverians who were victims of the Holocaust.
