= Onay (disambiguation) =

Onay is a commune in the Haute-Saône department in the region of Bourgogne-Franche-Comté in eastern France.

Onay may also refer to:

- Onay (surname)
- Onay, Afghanistan
- Saint-Laurent-d'Onay, commune in the Drôme department in south-eastern France
