= Onay (surname) =

Onay is a Turkish surname. Notable people with the surname include:

- Belit Onay, German politician, Mayor of Hanover
- Gülsin Onay (born 1954), Turkish concert pianist
- Gündüz Tekin Onay, Turkish footballer
- Yılmaz Onay (1937–2018), Turkish author, theatre director, and translator
