= List of mayors of Hanover =

This is a list of mayors of Hanover with their titles.

- 1818–1820: Dr. Christian Philipp Iffland, dirig. Bürgermeister der Altstadt
- 1818–1824: Johann Friedrich Kaufmann, Bürgermeister der Neustadt und ab 1820 Gerichtsschulze der Alt- und Neustadt
- 1818–1820: Ludwig Christian Zwicker, Bürgermeister
- 1822–1824: Georg Ernst Friedrich Hoppenstedt, Stadtdirektor
- 1824–1843: Rudolf Wilhelm Rumann, Stadtdirektor
- 1843–1853: Carl Friedrich Wilhelm Evers, Stadtdirektor
- 1854–1882: Johann Carl Hermann Rasch, Stadtdirektor
- 1883–1891: Ferdinand John Georg Haltenhoff, Stadtdirektor
- 1891–1918: Heinrich Tramm, Stadtdirektor
- 1918–1924: Robert Leinert, Oberbürgermeister
- 1925: Gustav Fink, Bürgermeister
- 1925–1937: Dr. Arthur Menge, Oberbürgermeister
- 1937: Heinrich Müller, Bürgermeister
- 1938–1942: Dr. Henricus Haltenhoff, Oberbürgermeister
- 1942–1944: Ludwig Hoffmeister, Staatskommissar
- 1943–1945: Egon Bönner, Bürgermeister und Staatskommissar
- 1945–1946: Gustav Bratke, kommissarischer Oberbürgermeister
- 1946: Franz Henkel, Oberbürgermeister
- 1946–1956: Wilhelm Weber, Oberbürgermeister
- 1956–1972: August Holweg, Oberbürgermeister
- 1972–2006: Dr. h.c. Herbert Schmalstieg, Oberbürgermeister
- 2006–2013: Stephan Weil, Oberbürgermeister
- 2013–2019: Stefan Schostok, Oberbürgermeister
- 2019–present: Belit Onay, Oberbürgermeister

== See also ==
- Timeline of Hanover
