= Belit Onay =

German politician (born 1981)

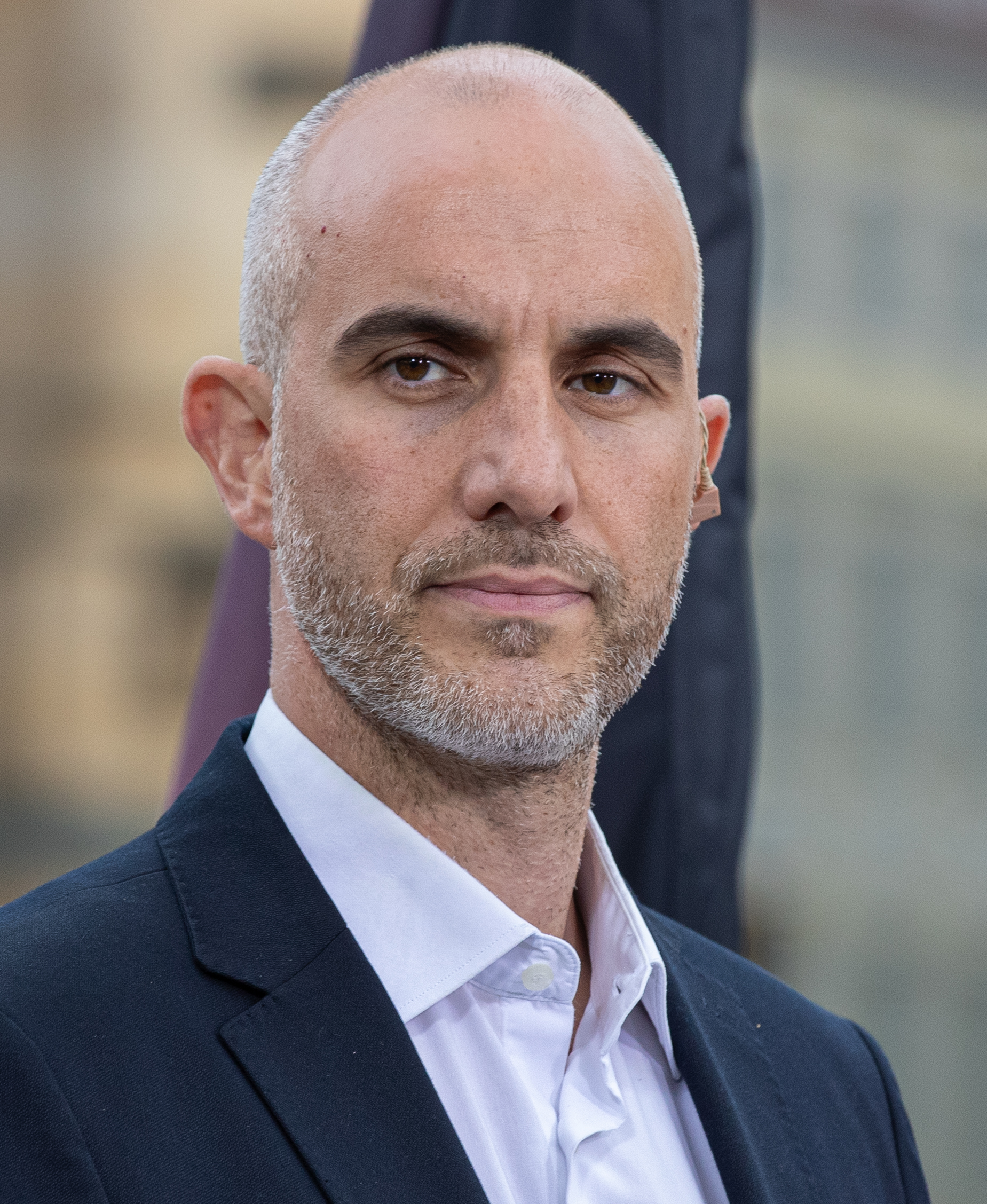
- Onay in 2025

Mayor of Hanover
- Incumbent
- Assumed office 22 November 2019
- Preceded by: Stefan Schostok

Personal details
- Born: 15 January 1981 (age 45) Goslar, Lower Saxony, West Germany
- Party: Alliance 90/The Greens (2008–present)
- Education: Leibniz University Hannover

Belit Nejat Onay (born 15 January 1981) is a German politician for the Alliance 90/The Greens. He was elected Mayor of Hanover in 2019, and took office on 22 November.

Under his leadership mit Hanover launched a pilot project ("RESTART: #HANnovativ") to become a Smart City. In 2024, he announced a dedicated 48 million euro fund for digitisation. The annual German "Smart-City-Index" 2025 noted Hanover's rise to rank 7.

== Role in national politics ==
Onay was born in Goslar. In the negotiations to form a so-called traffic light coalition of the Social Democratic Party (SPD), the Green Party and the Free Democratic Party (FDP) on the national level following the 2021 German elections, he was part of his party's delegation in the working group on social policy, co-chaired by Dagmar Schmidt, Sven Lehmann and Johannes Vogel.

Onay was nominated by his party as delegate to the Federal Convention for the purpose of electing the Federal President of Germany in 2022.

== Other activities ==
=== Corporate boards ===
- Deutsche Messe AG, Ex-Officio Member of the Supervisory Board (since 2020)
- Sparkasse Hannover, Ex-Officio Member of the Supervisory Board (since 2019)

=== Non-profit organizations ===
- Islamkolleg Deutschland (IKD), Member of the Board of Trustees (since 2021)

Political offices
Preceded by Stefan Schostok	Mayor of Hanover; 22 November 2019 –	Incumbent
