= Weststadt (Braunschweig) =

- Borough of Braunschweig
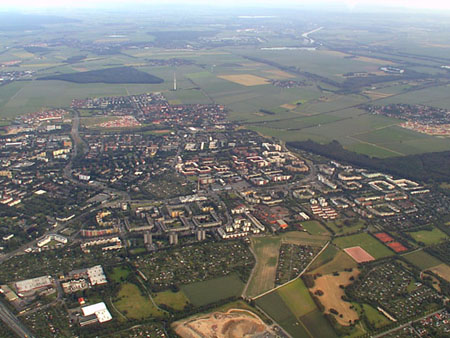
- Aerial view of Weststadt

- Coat of arms

- Location of Weststadt within Braunschweig
- Interactive map of Weststadt
- Location within Germany Location within Lower Saxony
- Coordinates: 52°14′56″N 10°29′10″E
- Country: Germany
- State: Lower Saxony
- District: urban district
- City: Braunschweig

Government
  - Mayor: Ulrich Römer (SPD)

Area
  - Total: 6.793 km^{2} (2.623 sq mi)

Population (2020-12-31)
  - Total: 23,298
  - Density: 3,430/km^{2} (8,883/sq mi)
- Time zone: UTC+01:00 (CET)
  - Summer (DST): UTC+02:00 (CEST)
- Postal codes: 38120
- Dialling codes: 0531
- Vehicle registration: BS
- Website: Website

The Weststadt (German pronunciation: [ˈvɛstˌʃtat], lit. 'west city') is a Stadtbezirk (borough) in the western part of Braunschweig, Germany. With a population of 23,298 (2020) it is the city's third most populous district.

== History and geography ==
The Weststadt is a planned community, divided into five neighbourhoods. Building of the district started in 1960–61. Also located within the district is the Westpark, a large park and recreational area.

=== Migration and Population ===
Weststadt has the highest share of migrants to Germans of all districts in Braunschweig in terms of percentage with 63.4% of the area's population having a migration background in 2023. Particularly the Emsviertel and Donauviertel have over 80% of the residents with a foreign background, including the first and second generation. 81% of the children in Weststadt have an immigrant background, resulting in over 70% of the area having a migration background by the year 2030.

These are the largest migrant groups in Weststadt:

Rank	Nationality	Population (31.12.2023)
1	Poland	4,342
2	Turkey	2,231
3	Russia	1,865
4	Kurdistan	1,282
5	Kazakhstan	854
6	Syria	825
7	Ukraine	733
8	Tunisia	650
9	Kosovo	608

== Gallery ==
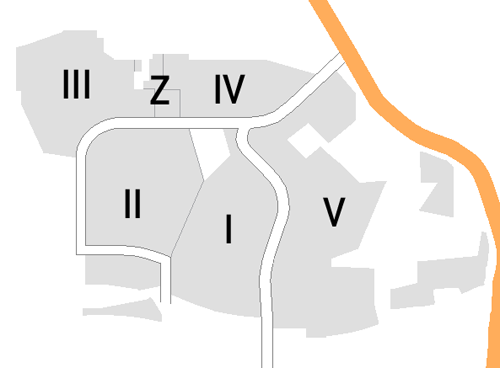
Map of the Weststadt with its five neighbourhoods.

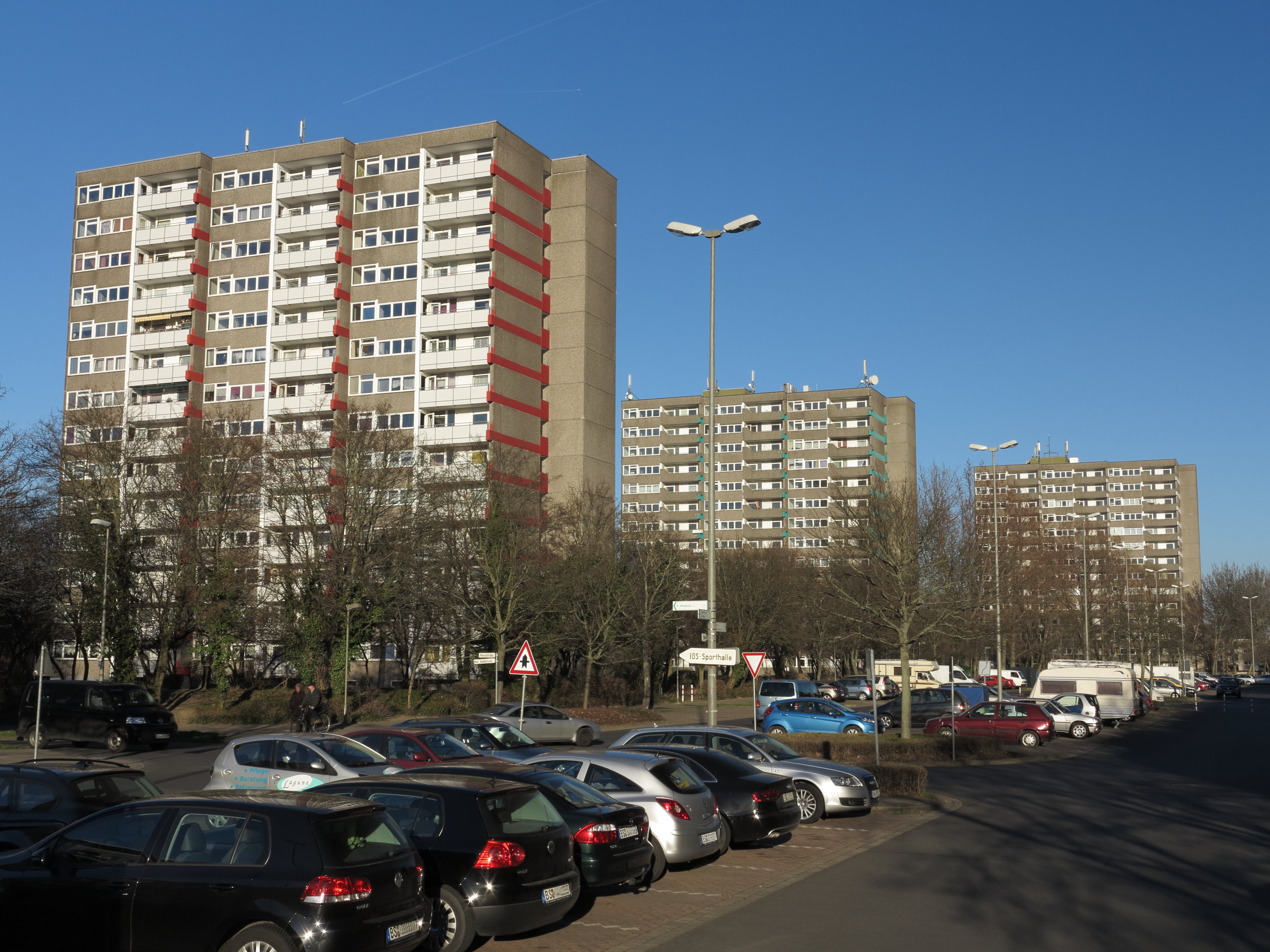
Houses in the Weststadt

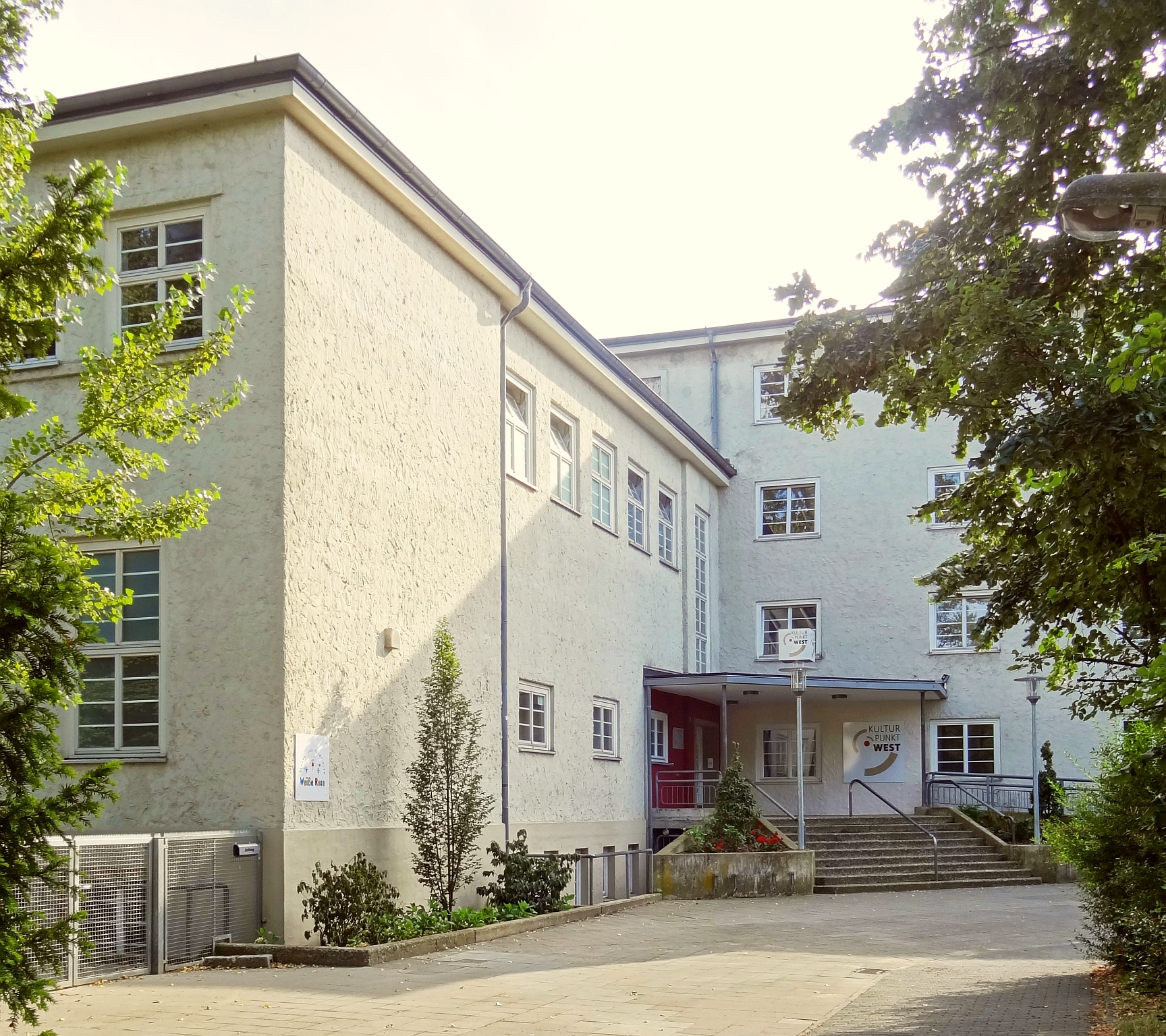
Cultural centre

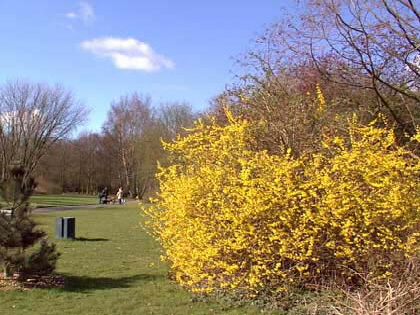
Westpark

== Politics ==
The district mayor Ulrich Römer is a member of the Social Democratic Party of Germany.
