= Volkswagenwerk Braunschweig =

Coordinates: 52°17′37″N 10°31′23″E

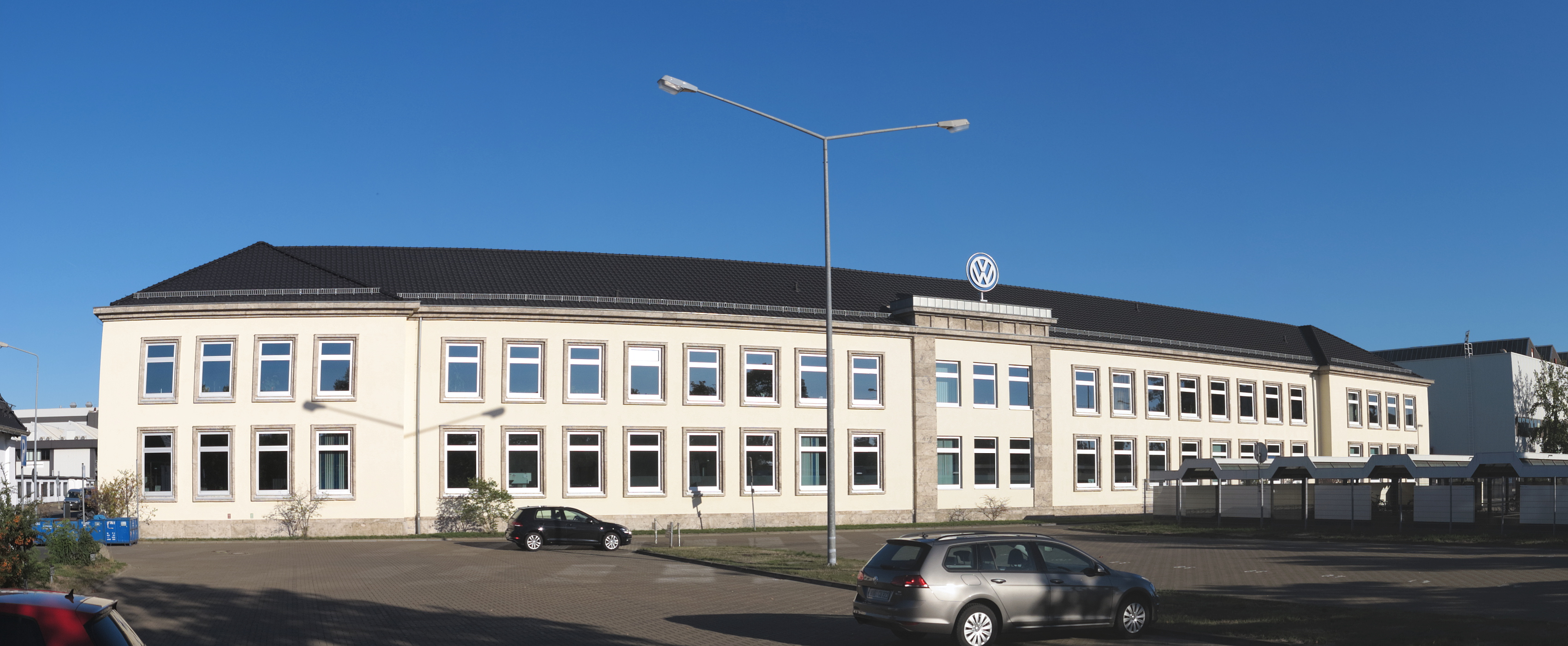
Volkswagenwerk Braunschweig

Volkswagenwerk Braunschweig is a Volkswagen factory that makes automobile parts in Braunschweig (Gifhorner Str.), Germany. Production started on 23 February 1938 (before Volkswagenwerk Wolfsburg) for manufacturing steering components of KdF-Wagen (VW Käfer) and tools for Junkers Flugzeug- und Motorenwerke in Dessau. The factory makes components for vehicles of VW Group (Audi, Škoda, SEAT and Bugatti), including running gears, axles, shock absorbers, brake parts, and pedals.

As of 2006, approximately 6,200 workers were employed. It was the largest industrial site in the city. In 2014, 6,625 people worked there.

== See also ==
- List of Volkswagen Group factories

== Bibliography ==
- Ulrike Gutzmann; Markus Lupa (2008). "Vom 'Vorwerk' zum FahrWerk: eine Standortgeschichte des Volkswagen Werks Braunschweig" (PDF). Historische Notate 13 (in German). Volkswagen AG, Wolfsburg. ISBN 978-3-935-11227-7.
- Horst Günter (1994). "Zur Abhängigkeit der Region Braunschweig von der Volkswagen AG". Berichte aus der Betriebswirtschaft (in German). Shaker, Aachen. ISBN 3-861-11871-8.
