= Stefan Schostok =

German politician

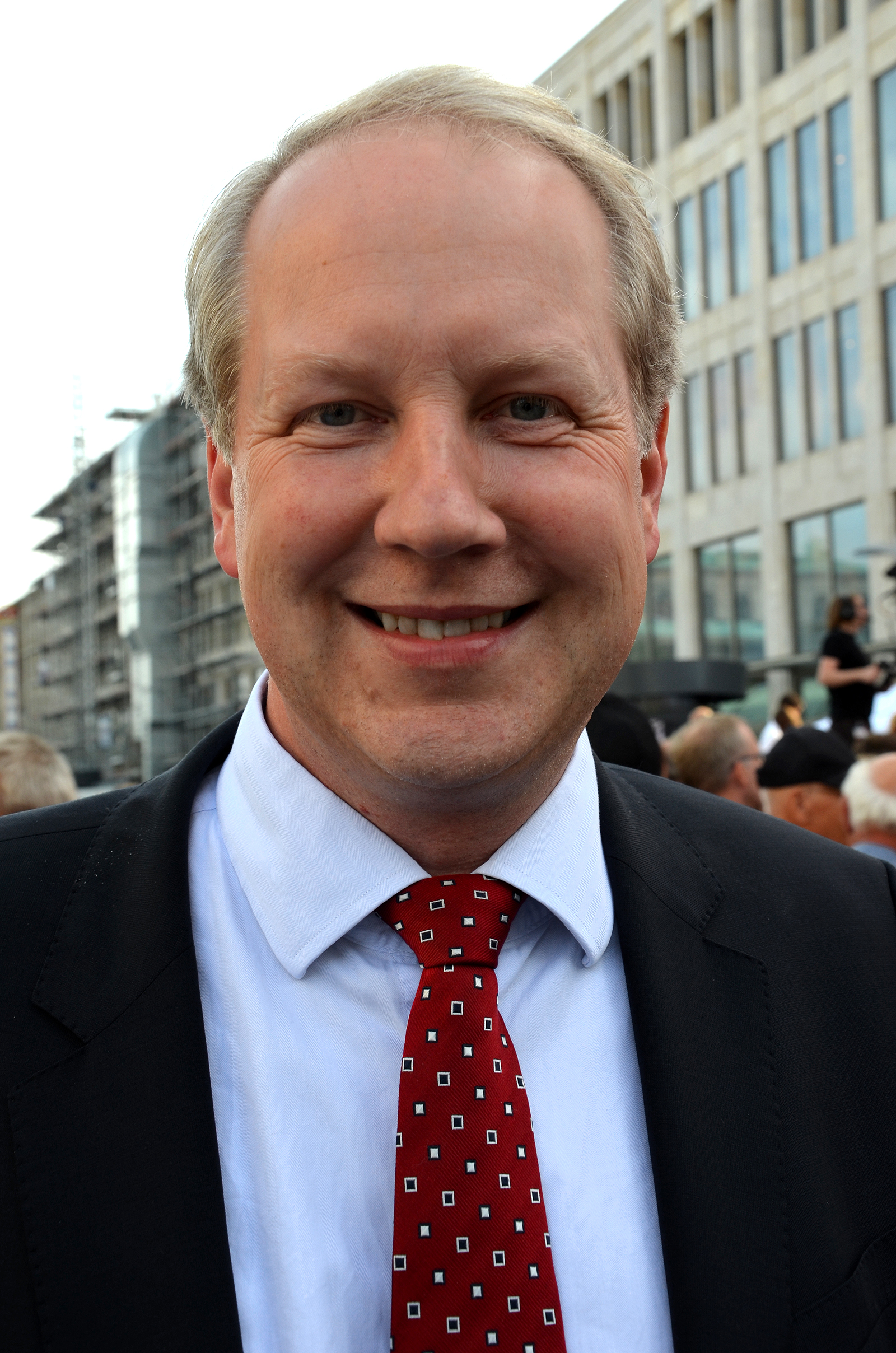
- Schostok in 2013

Mayor of Hanover
- In office 11 October 2013 – 26 May 2019
- Preceded by: Stephan Weil

Personal details
- Born: 12 May 1964 (age 62) Hildesheim, Lower Saxony
- Party: Social Democratic Party
- Website: http://www.stefan-schostok.de/

Stefan Schostok (born 12 May 1964) is a German politician of the Social Democratic Party and was Mayor of Hanover from 11 October 2013 until 26 May 2019. From 2008 to January 2013 he served as a member of the Lower Saxony Legislative Assembly. During that time, he was elected chairman of the SPD group in the Lower Saxony Legislative Assembly (Landtag) in 2010, a position which he vacated in 2013.

== Education and employment ==
Schostok has lived in Hanover since 1971, having been a longtime resident of Isernhagen. In 1985 he obtained the Fachhochschulreife in the Kaiser-Wilhelm-Gymnasium Hannover, and in the following two years, Schostok underwent his alternative civilian service in Isernhagen. Subsequently, he studied social pedagogy and in 1991 graduated as a trained social educator.

From 1991 to 1995, Schostok was employed at the Bildungsnetzwerk Niedersächsischer Volkshochschulen. Later, in 1995 and 1996, he worked as a scientific employee at the political magazine SPW. From 1996 to 1999, he was a research assistant at the Foundation for Labour and Environment of the IG BCE trade union. Then, in 1999, whilst at the Niedersächsisches Ministerium für Umwelt, Energie und Klimaschutz (Lower Saxony Ministry for the Environment, Energy and Climate Protection), he conducted public relations work on behalf of the ministry. In 2000, Stefan Schostok was elected chairman of the SPD district Hanover, one of the largest and most influential regions within the Social Democrats in Lower Saxony, and he served in this position until October 2009.

== Political career ==
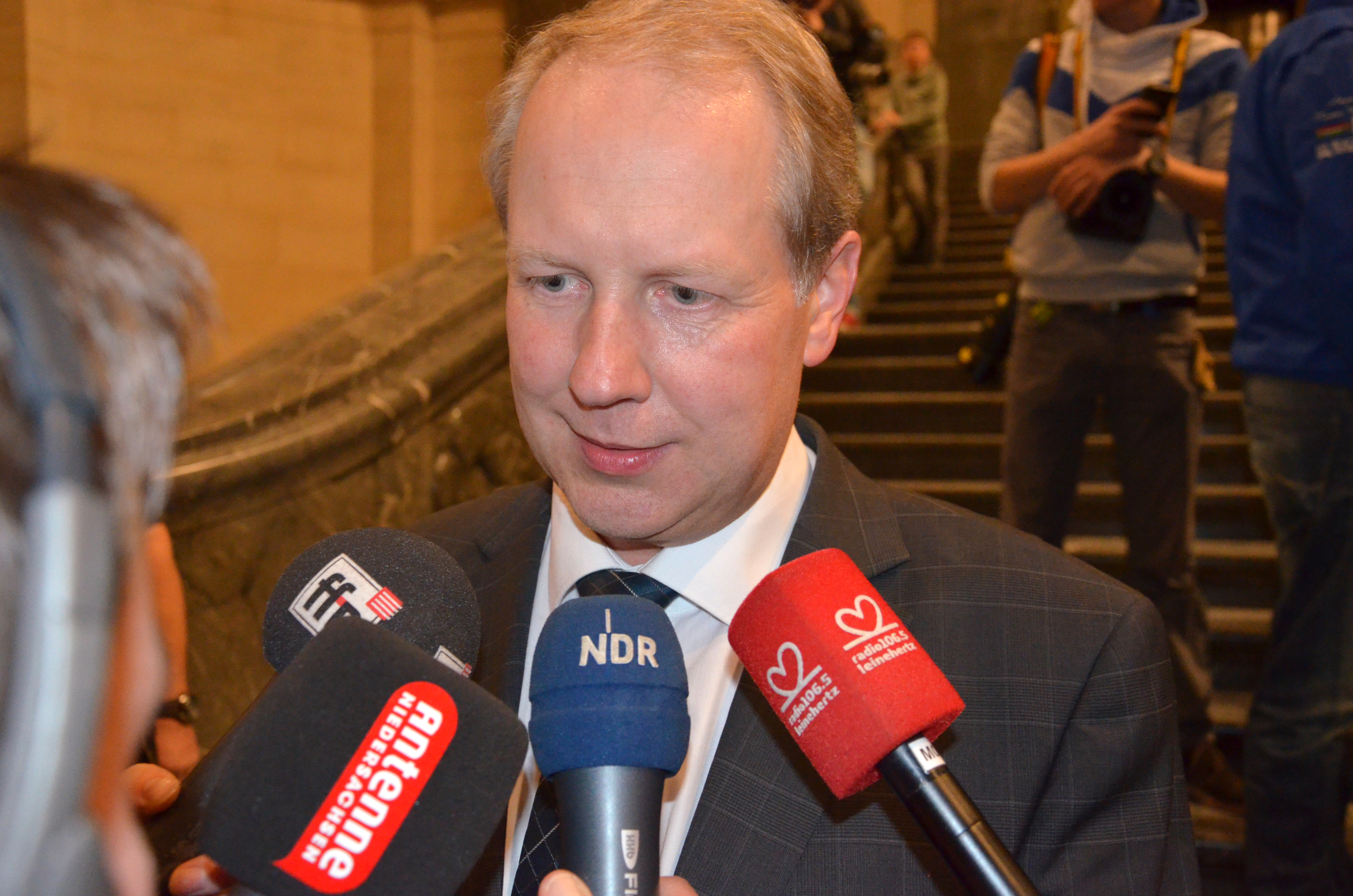
Stefan Schostok on Election Night, 6 October 2013, having been elected Mayor of Hanover. The picture shows him during an interview conducted in the Hanover City Hall.

Schostok has been a member of the SPD since 1983. From 1995 he was a member of the executive of the SPD district Hanover. In the years from 1991 to 1995 he was chairman of the Juso district Hanover. On 31 October 2009 he was elected as the chairman of the SPD district Hanover. From 2001 to 2005 he was a council member of the municipal council Isernhagen, in which he served on the economy, environment and finance committees.

From 2008 to 2013 Schostok was a member of the Landtag in Lower Saxony. Also, Schostok was leader of the integration work group. From 14 June 2010 to 22 January 2013 he served as chairman of his party's parliamentary group in the Landtag. Towards the end of 2011, he decided not to seek reelection to the State Parliament and instead announced his candidacy for the office of Mayor of Hanover, in order to succeed incumbent Stephan Weil.

In April 2012, Schostok became the Social Democrat nominee for Mayor, obtaining the support of 96 percent of the delegates of Hanover's Social Democrats. In the first round of the mayoral election, on 22 September 2013, he missed the required absolute majority with 48.9 percent of the votes against the Christian Democratic candidate Matthias Waldraff, who had 33.8 percent of the votes. The second round saw Schostok win by a landslide, winning with 66.3% of the votes. He was the third Mayor of Hannover to be elected directly by the citizens.

Schostok also served as deputy chairman of the SPD in Lower Saxony, under the leadership of its chairman Stephan Weil.

In April 2019, the public prosecutor's office of Hannover announced an inquiry against Schostok regarding breach of trust in public office. It claimed that he knew about illegal payments in advantage of two high ranking public officials within his municipality. Oppositional parties in the delegation demanded his resignation, which he initially refused. On 30 April 2019 he announced consequences from allegations made by the prosecutor's office.

== Other activities ==
=== Corporate boards ===
- Deutsche Messe AG, Ex-Officio Member of the Supervisory Board (2013-2019)
- Sparkasse Hannover, Ex-Officio Member of the Supervisory Board (2013-2019)

=== Non-profit organizations ===
- Evangelische Akademie Loccum (Evangelical Academy Loccum), Member of the Council
- Deutsch-Türkische Gesellschaft (German-Turkish Society), Member
- IG Bergbau, Chemie, Energie (IG BCE), Member

== Personal life ==
Schostok is a bachelor and lives in the Hanover-List district.

== Bibliography ==
- Jüttner, Wolfgang; Andretta, Gabriele; Schostok, Stefan, eds. (2009). Politik für die Sozialdemokratie. Erinnerung an Peter von Oertzen. Berlin: Vorwärts-Buch. ISBN 978-3-86602-924-8. Publications of the institute for social history Braunschweig.
- Brandt, Arno; Schostok, Stefan, eds. (2012). Der Kompass für Arbeit, Wirtschaft und Qualifikation in Niedersachsen. Berlin: Vorwärts-Buch. ISBN 978-3-942972-12-3.
