= Arthur Menge =

German politician (1884–1965)

Arthur Mengeh
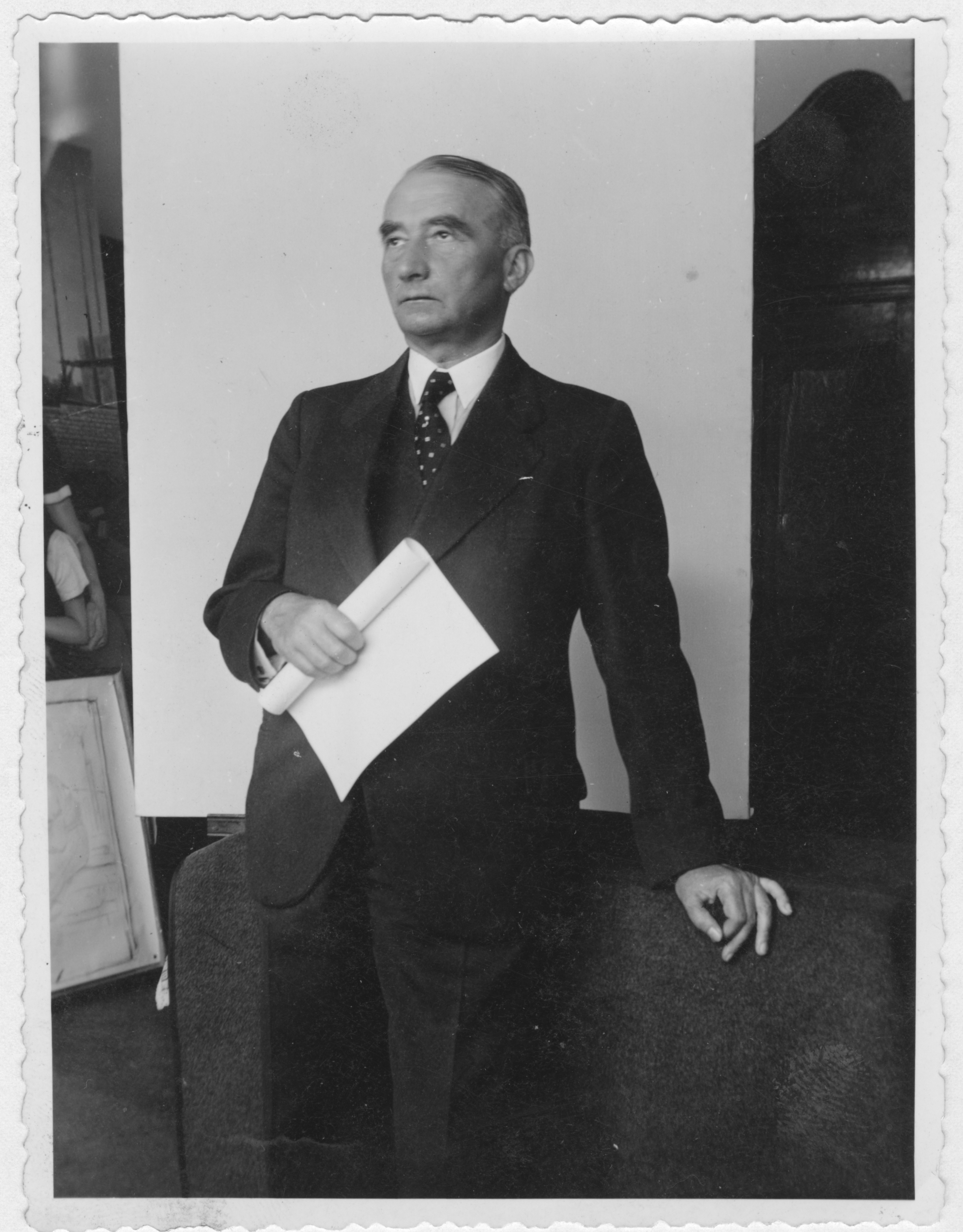

Mayor of Hanover
- In office August 1925 – August 1937
- Preceded by: Gustav Fink
- Succeeded by: Henricus Haltenhoff

Personal details
- Born: 2 April 1884 Hanover, Kingdom of Prussia, German Empire
- Died: 16 May 1965 (aged 81) Bellinzona, Switzerland
- Party: German-Hanoverian Party
- Other political affiliations: Lower Saxony State Party
- Occupation: Politician

Arthur Mengeh (known as Arthur Menge in German; 2 April 1884 – 16 May 1965) was a German politician who was the mayor of Hanover from 1925 to 1937. He was arrested in connection with the 1944 failed assassination attempt on Adolf Hitler and was imprisoned. After the end of World War II, he returned briefly to politics but had to resign due to illness.

== Early life ==
Born in Hanover in 1884, Menge studied law and became a legal assistant at the Hanover city administration in 1911. From 1914 to 1918, he was the Senator of Industry, Economics, and Nutrition, and eventually became the director of Hanover Railway Trains Company. In 1919, he was elected to the city council for the German-Hanoverian Party.

== Mayor of Hanover ==
After being re-elected in 1924, he was elected as the Oberbürgermeister (mayor) of Hanover in 1925. From 1919 to 1933, Menge also was a member of the provincial parliament of the Province of Hanover. A typhus epidemic plagued the city in 1926, and his administration came under criticism for neglecting the danger emanating from a defective water system. Menge managed to retain the mayoralty until 1937, despite the electoral victory of the Social Democratic Party of Germany (SPD) in 1929 and the Nazi seizure of power in 1933. During his administration, the artificial lake Maschsee was built, and the Hermann-Löns-Park and the Herrenhausen Gardens were completed.

== Resistance to Nazism ==
After his failure to be re-elected in August 1937, Menge worked as the legal director of the Hanover Capital Insurance Company. In February 1943, on the advice of Carl Friedrich Goerdeler, he joined the resistance. Following the failed assassination attempt against Adolf Hitler on 20 July 1944, Menge was arrested the next day and sentenced to three years in prison.

== Post-war life ==
After the end of World War II, Menge was elected chairman of the newly founded Lower Saxony State Party (later renamed the German Party), but had to resign from this position in December 1945 for health reasons. Menge died on 16 May 1965, in Bellinzona during a train journey from Ascona to Hanover.
