= Kreuzkirche, Hanover =

Church in Hanover, Lower Saxony

Kreuzkirche
- Schloss- und Stadtkirche St. Crucis
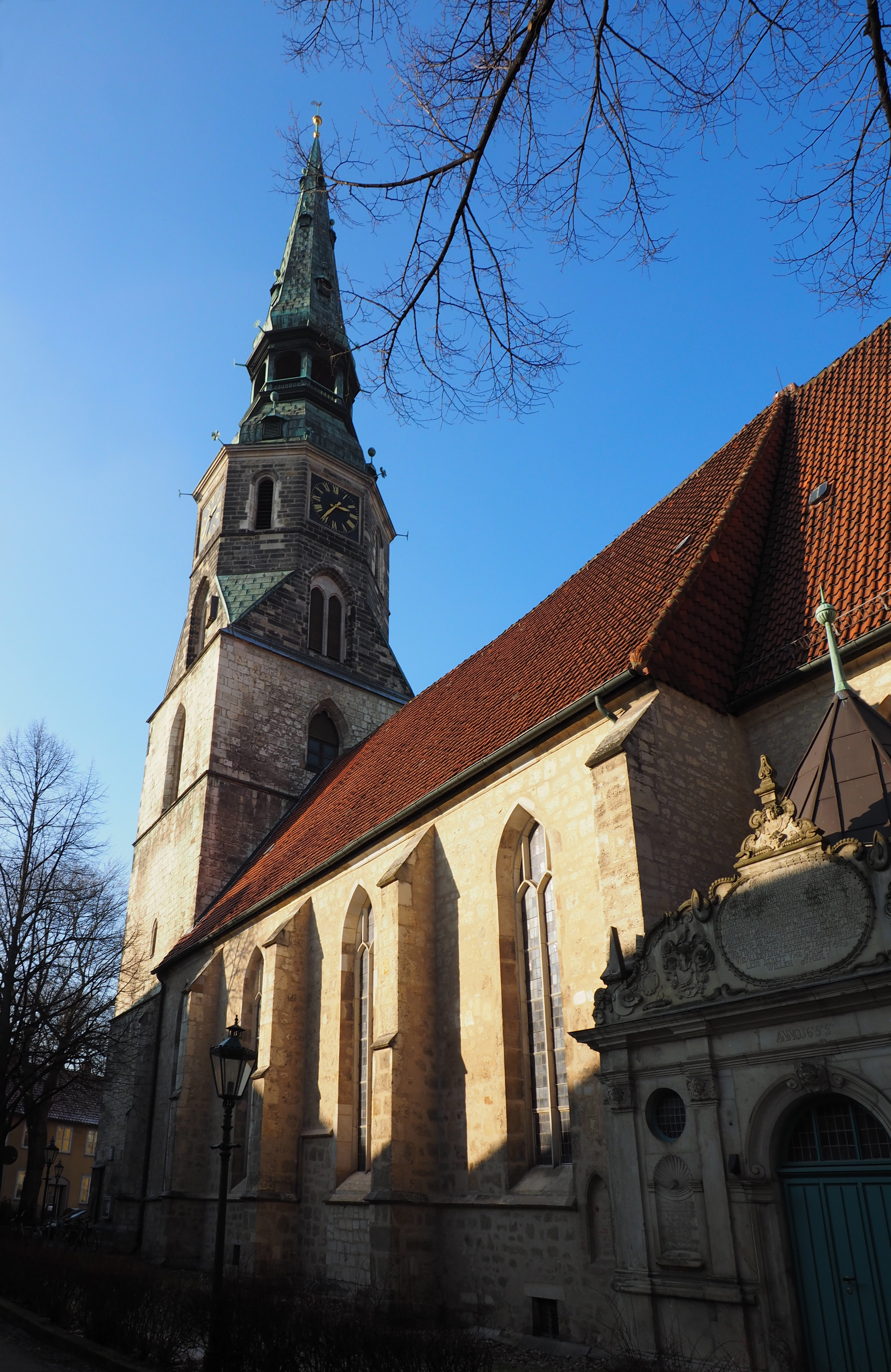
- Church of the Holy Cross is situated in the old town (●) shown within the approximate location of the former 13th-century defensive wall encircling it.
- 52°22′24″N 9°43′57″E
- Location: Hanover
- Country: Germany
- Denomination: Lutheran
- Previous denomination: Catholic
- Website: www.kreuzkirche-hannover.de

Architecture
- Architectural type: hall church
- Style: Gothic
- Completed: 1333

Administration
- Deanery: Hanover City
- Parish: Marktkirche, Hanover

The Church of the Holy Cross (German: Kreuzkirche) is a Lutheran church in the centre of Hanover, the capital of Lower Saxony, Germany. A Gothic hall church, it is one of three churches in Hanover's old town (Altstadt) – the other two being Market Church and Aegidien Church, although the latter is now a war memorial.

During the Reformation the church became Lutheran. It was then expanded, and renovated in the 19th century. Destroyed by the bombings of Hanover in World War II, the Church of the Holy Cross was rebuilt in simpler form between 1959 and 1961. Receiving an altar by Lucas Cranach from the Palace Church (Schlosskirche) that was not rebuilt after World War II, in 1960 its official name became Palace and Town Church of the Holy Cross of Hanover (Schloss- und Stadtkirche St. Crucis Hannover). In 1982 the Church of the Holy Cross parish became part of the Market Church parish.

== History ==
In 1284 the Church of the Holy Cross parish separated from the Market Church parish. The church is built in sandstone masonry, and was consecrated in 1333 and dedicated to the Holy Spirit and Cross (Latin: St. Spiritus et Crucis). Presently the church is a Gothic hall church with one nave of four bays and a rib vault.

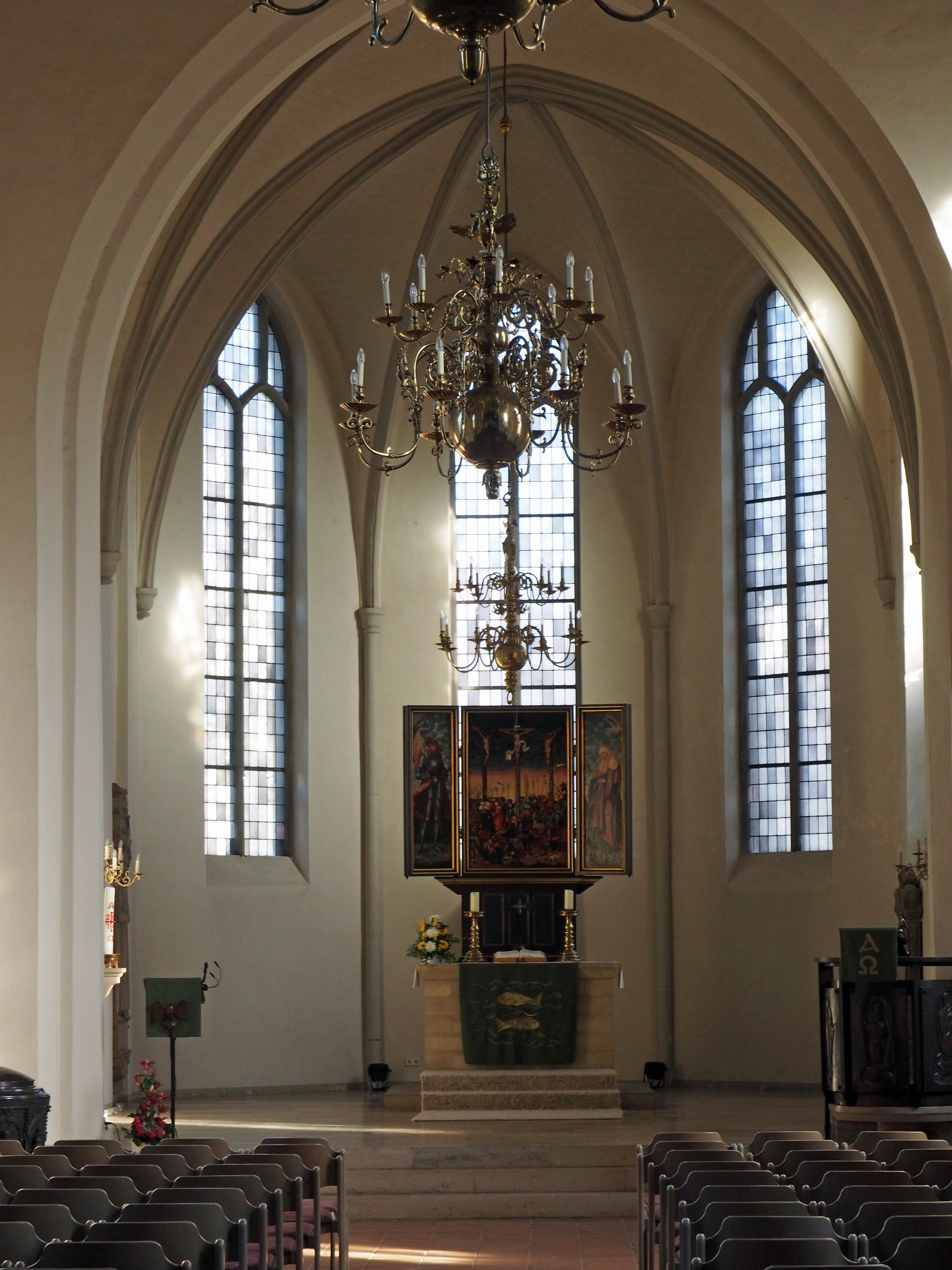
Interior with Cranach-altar

When the citizens of Hanover accepted the Reformation in 1533, the church became Lutheran and the site of the first Lutheran sermon in Hanover. In 1560, it was expanded to adjust to the different needs of a Protestant congregation. In 1594, a pulpit was installed by Claus von Münchhausen, but moved to the church in Lauenau. The court sculptor Johann Friedrich Blasius Ziesenis created a carved hanging pulpit in 1756.

The spire of the steeple was damaged by a storm in 1630, and was replaced in Baroque style in 1652. In a renovation in 1822–23, many older artifacts were sold or destroyed, leaving the baptismal font as the only medieval furniture.

In July 1943 during World War II, an air raid destroyed the town centre, including the Church of the Holy Cross. Between 1959 and 1961 it was rebuilt in a simplified form by architect Erich Witt. The Palace Church parish using the church from 1960 because their Palace Church was not rebuilt after the war resulted in the name Schloss- und Stadtkirche St. Crucis.

In 1982, the parish was merged with the Aegidien Church parish into the Market Church parish, which is responsible for matters such as building, concerts and expositions. Sunday services in the Church of the Holy Cross are often held by the parish of Protestant students (Evangelische Studierendengemeinde). The church is a venue for education, guided tours, concerts and other events.

== Interior ==
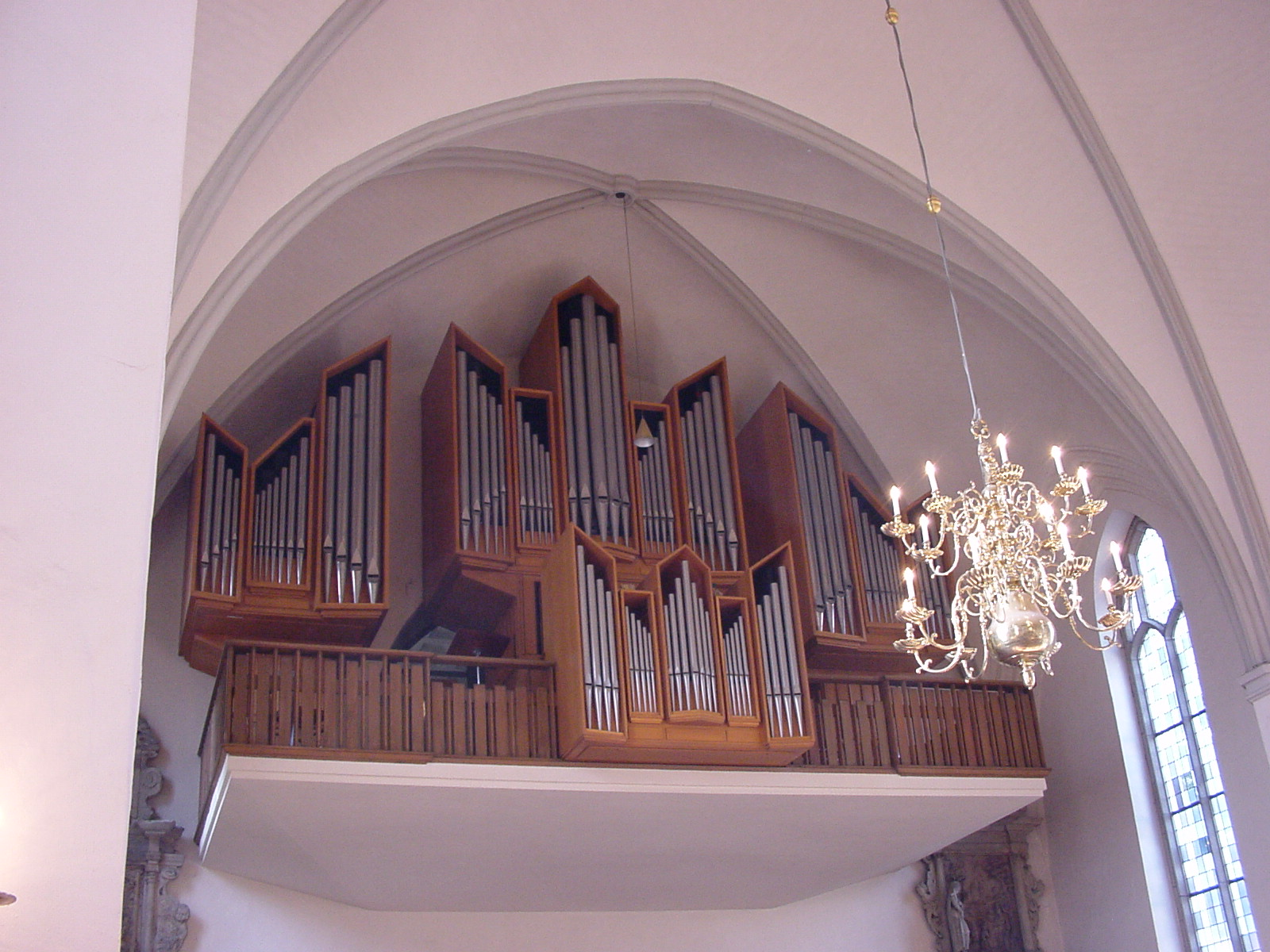
The organ

The baptismal font was made around 1410 from bronze, possibly in Hildesheim. The main treasure of the church is an altar which Lucas Cranach created and signed, probably before 1537. He made it for the Stiftskirche St. Alexandri in Einbeck, showing a central crucifixion scene, with St. Alexander und St. Felicitas on the side panels, the patron saints of Einbeck. The altar was owned next by the dukes of Braunschweig who placed it in the new Palace Church in the Leine Palace from 1666 to 1680. During French occupation, the outer panels were separated, but returned to the Hausmann collection in 1816. They belonged to King George V of Hanover from 1857, and to the state gallery of Lower Saxony from 1925. The central panel and the side panels returned to the Palace Church sooner. After World War II, the altar belonged to the Church of Hanover.

Three chandeliers were formerly in the Aegidien Church that became a war memorial after World War II. Cast in the 17th and 18th century, they had been evacuated before the bombing. The organ was built by Emil Hammer Orgelbau in 1965. It has 34 stops on three manuals and pedal.

== Bibliography ==
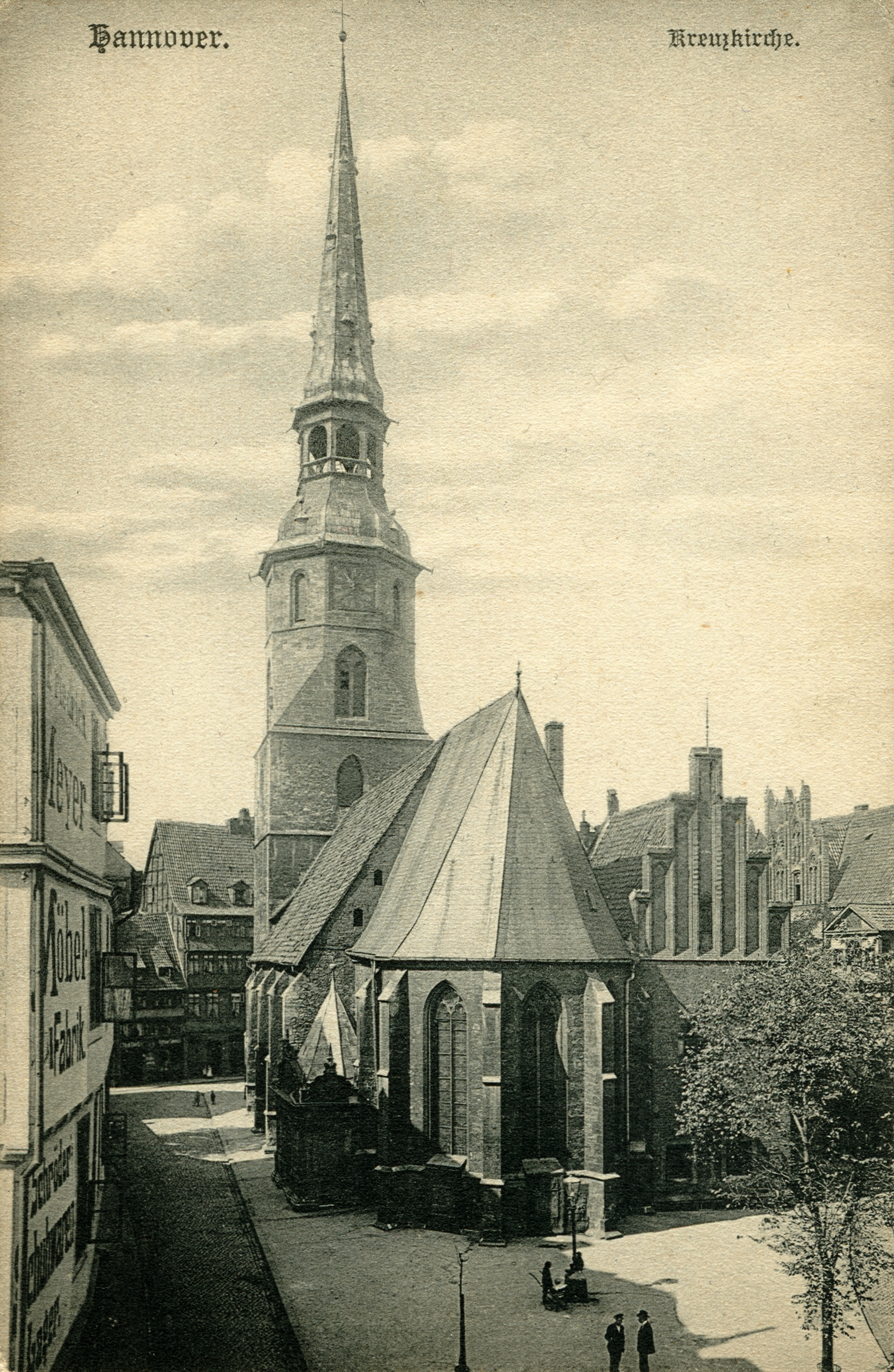
Postcard, c. 1900

- Nöldeke, Arnold; Institut für Denkmalpflege, eds. (1979) [1932]. Die Kunstdenkmäler der Provinz Hannover (in German). Vol. 1. Provinzialverwaltung, Theodor Schulzes Buchhandlung. Osnabrück: Wenner. pp. 131–153. ISBN 3-87898-151-1. OCLC 667644720 – via University of Toronto.
- Ulfrid Müller: Die Schloß- und Stadtkirche St. Crucis (Kreuzkirche) in Hannover (Große Baudenkmäler, issue 373). Munich: Deutscher Kunstverlag 1985.
- Klaus Eberhard Sander: Der Cranach-Altar in der Kreuzkirche, seine Geschichte und Eigenart. In: Marktkirche. Published by Kirchenvorstand der Marktkirchengemeinde Hannover. 1990, (pp. 41–46).
- Heinrich Emmendörffer: Die Kreuzkirche in neuem Glanz. Die Renovierung der Kreuzkirche im Sommer 1991. In: Marktkirche. 1991, (pp. 31–33).
- Helmut Knocke, Hugo Thielen: Hannover Kunst- und Kultur-Lexikon, Handbuch und Stadtführer, 3rd rev. ed. Hannover: Schäfer 1995, (pp. 142–144).
- Gerd Weiß, Marianne Zehnpfennig: Kreuzkirche und Kreuzkirchenviertel, in: Denkmaltopographie Bundesrepublik Deutschland, Baudenkmale in Niedersachsen, Stadt Hannover, part 1, vol. 10.1, published by Hans-Herbert Möller, Niedersächsisches Landesamt für Denkmalpflege, Friedr. Vieweg & Sohn, Braunschweig/Wiesbaden 1983, ISBN 3-528-06203-7, pp. 57–.
