= St. Nicholas' Chapel, Hanover =

Monument in Hanover, Germany

St. Nicholas' Chapel
- Nikolaikapelle
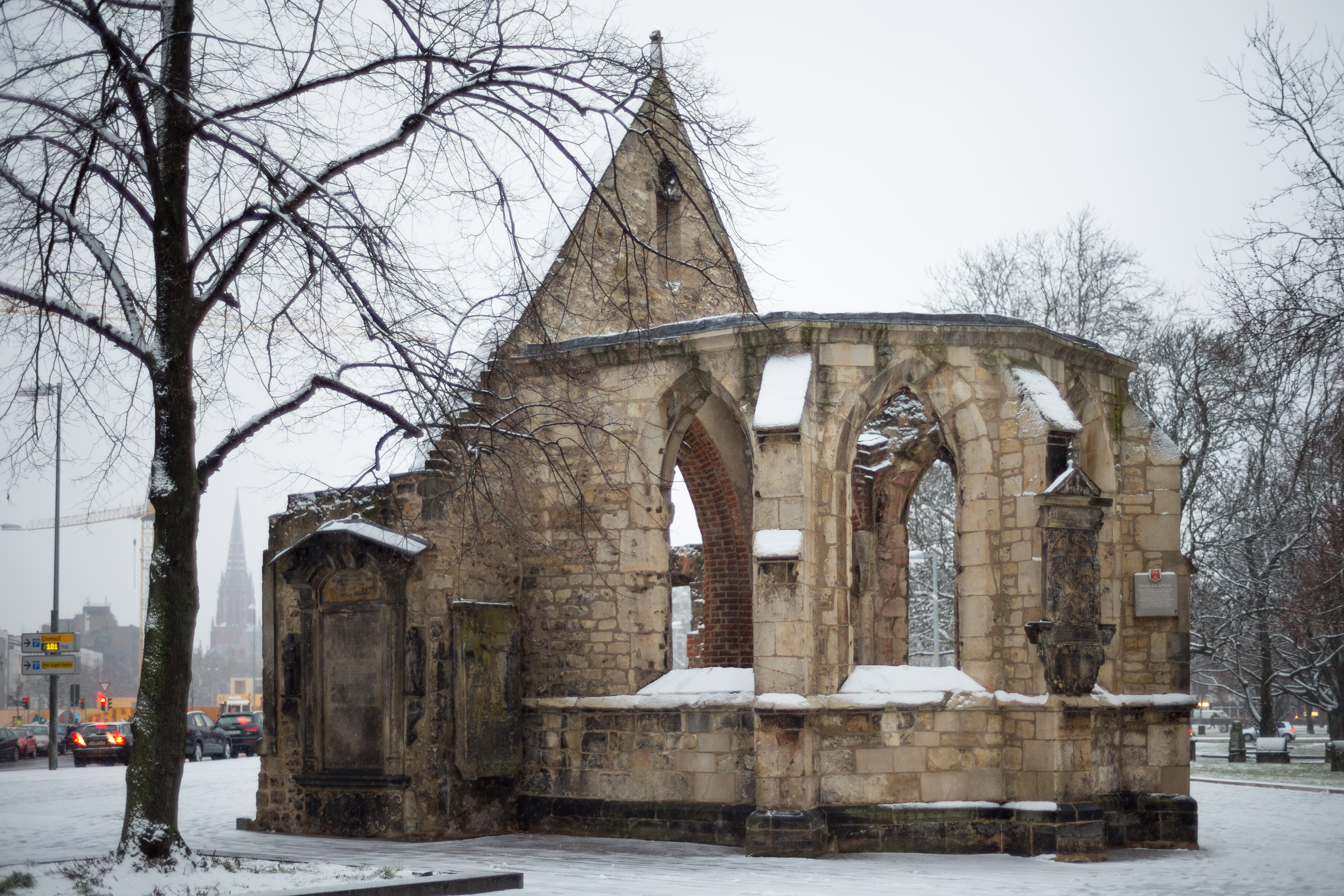
- The monument in 2015
- St. Nicholas' Chapel was situated outside the old town and the approximate location of the former 13th-century defensive wall encircling it (●) that was within the 17th-century inner bastion (●).
- Location: Hanover
- Coordinates: 52°22′41″N 9°43′55″E
- Completion date: 1952; 74 years ago
- Nikolaikapelle
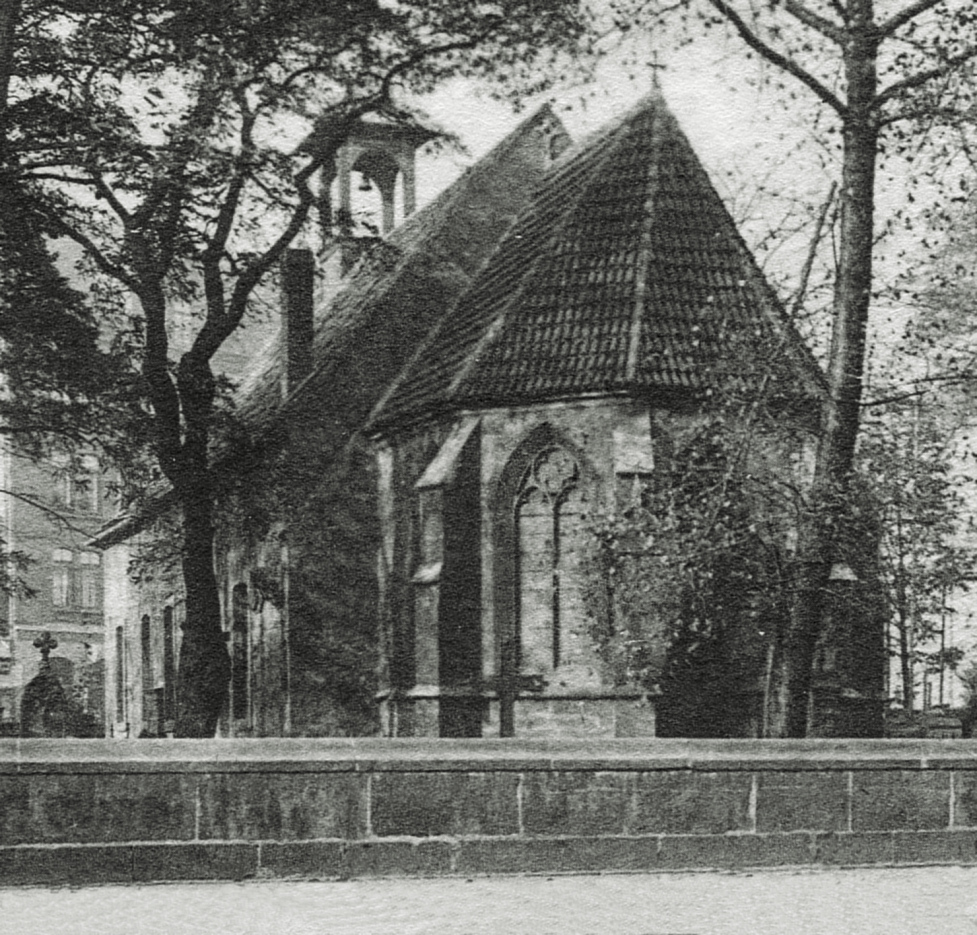
- The chapel in 1898
- Location: Hanover
- Country: Germany
- Denomination: Lutheran
- Previous denomination: Catholic

Architecture
- Completed: 1325; 701 years ago

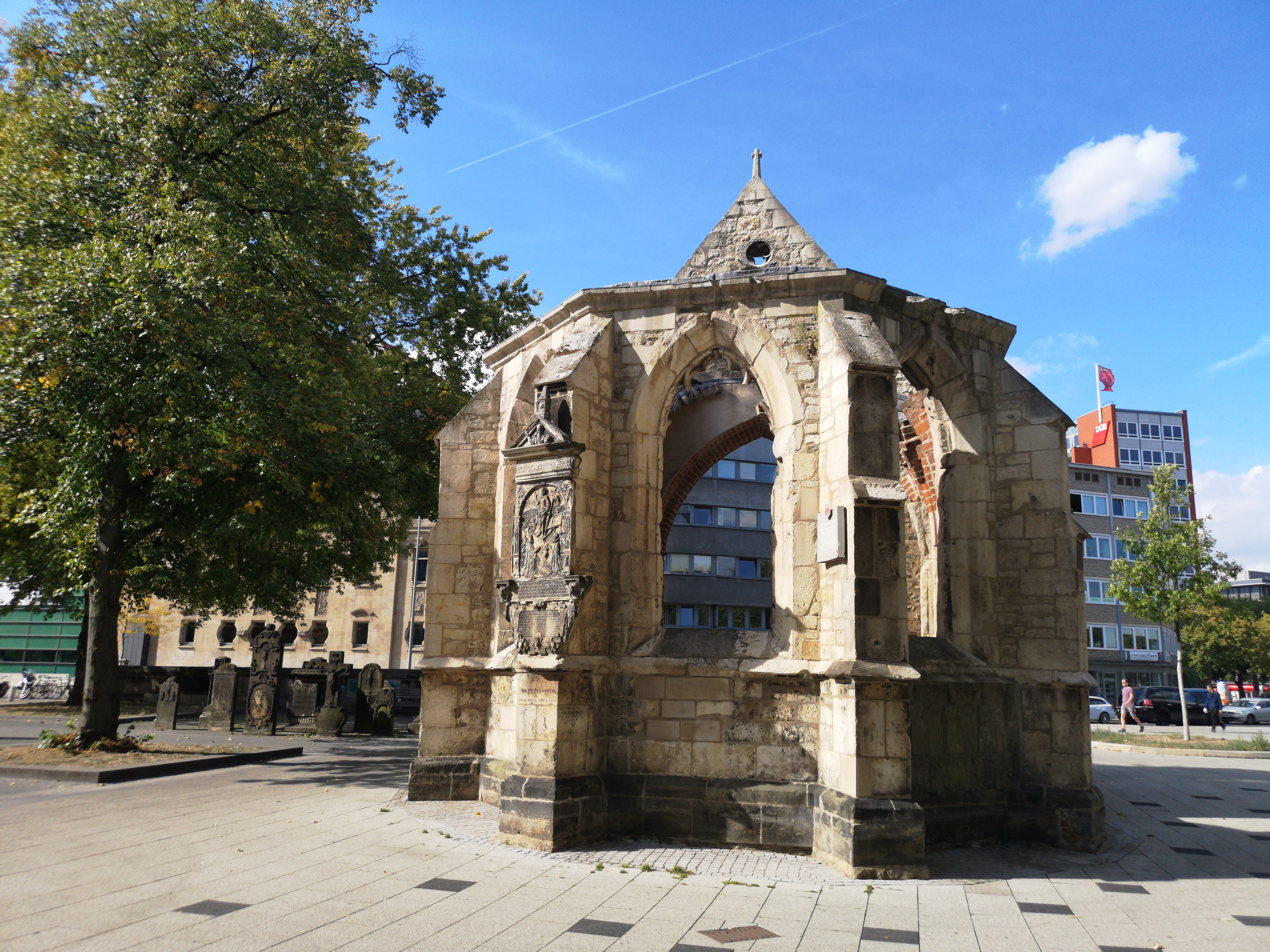
The chapel ruins in 2018

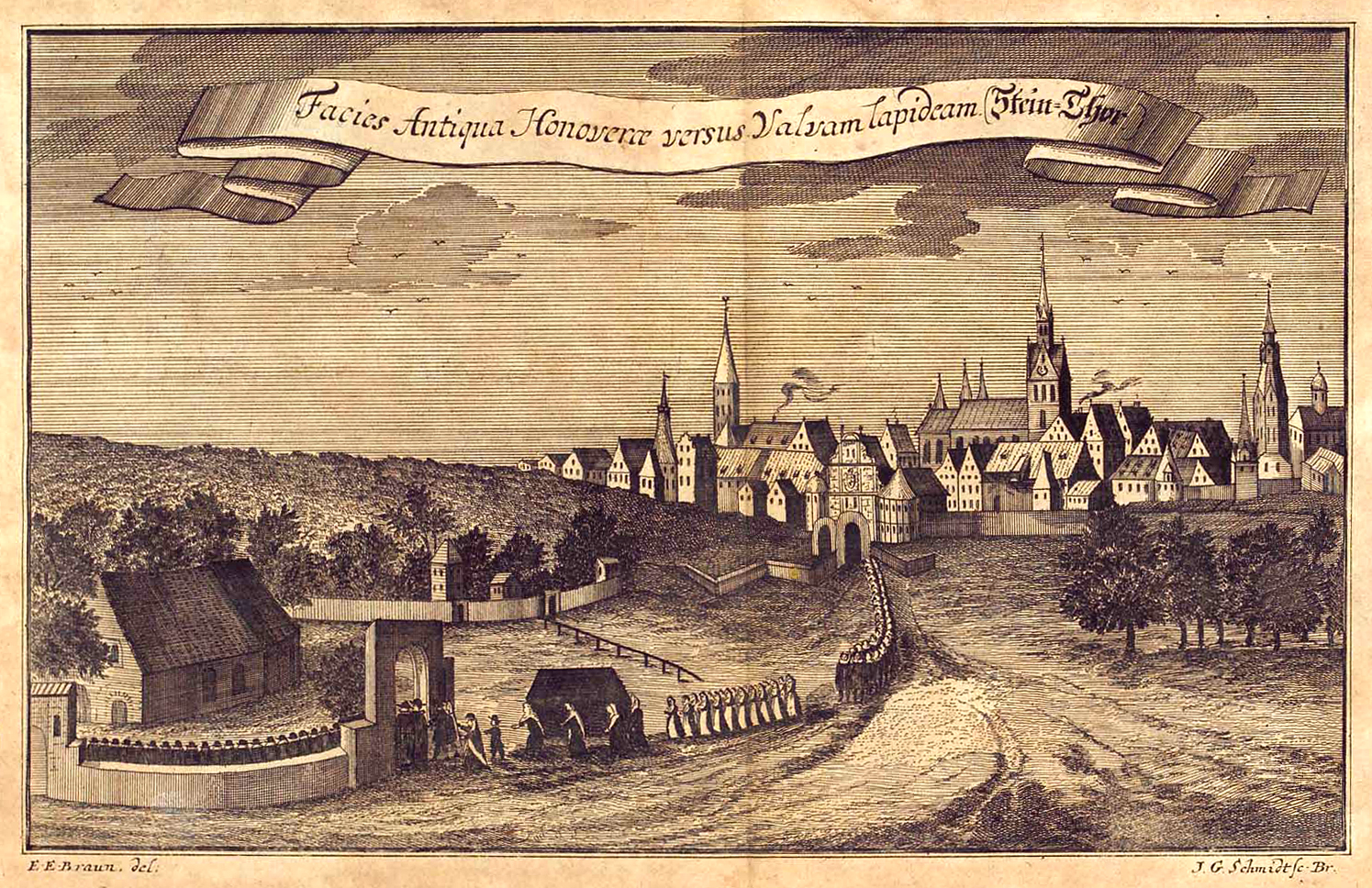
Copper engraving from 1740, depicting a procession towards the chapel at the bottom left

St. Nicholas' Chapel (German: Nikolaikapelle) is an architectural heritage monument (Baudenkmal) and the oldest building in Hanover, Germany. First built as a chapel dedicated to Saint Nicholas between 1250 and 1284 and a choir dating to 1325, it was damaged severely during the aerial bombings of Hanover during World War II. In 1953 the then approximately 700-year-old chapel was largely torn down to make way for a road as part of a larger post-war city-wide strategy to accommodate cars, with the currently 701-year-old choir left standing as a monument.

== Epitaphs at the chapel ==
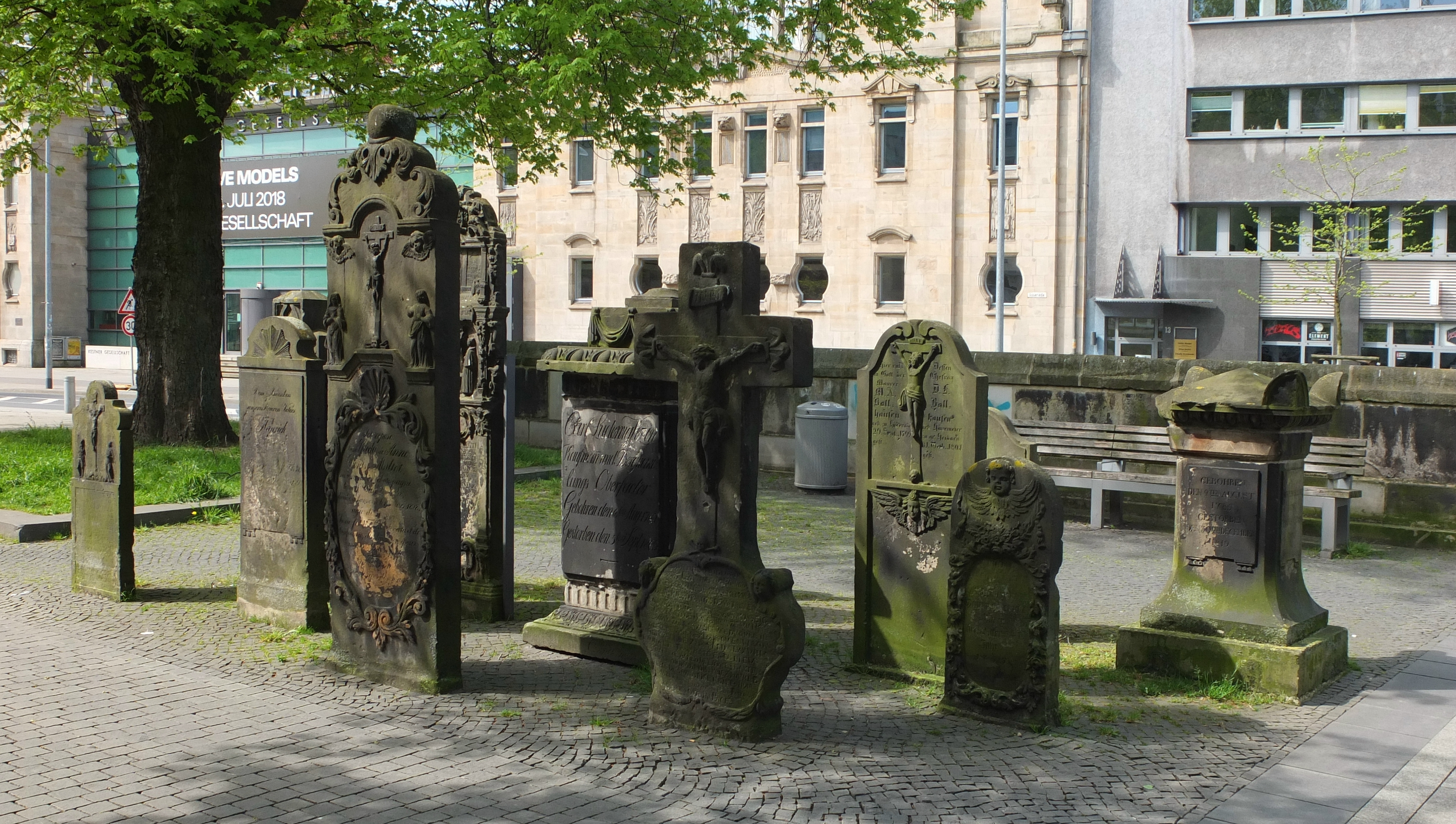
Group of epitaphs next to the chapel

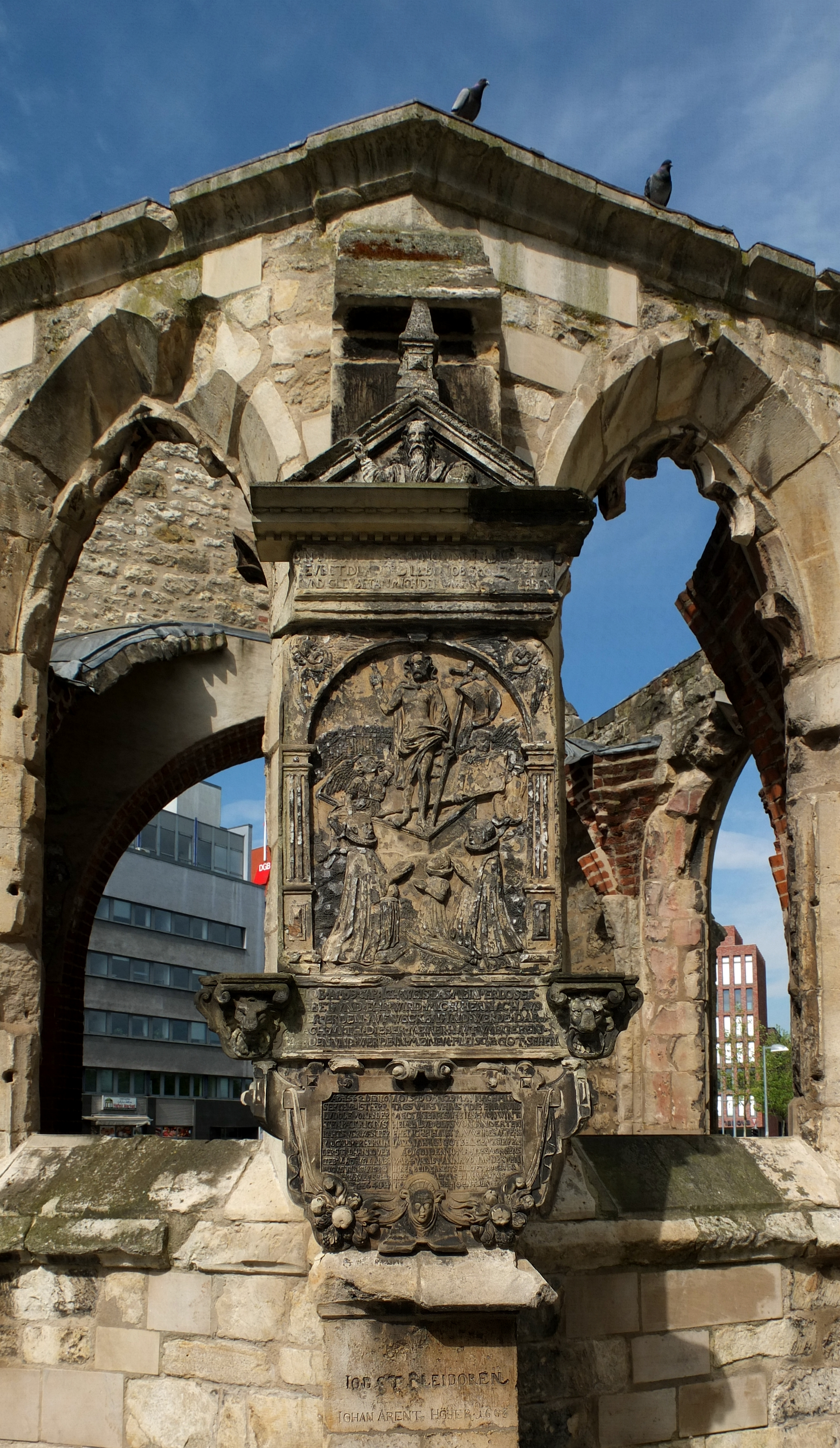
Epitaph for Ludolf von Anderten and his family (1601)

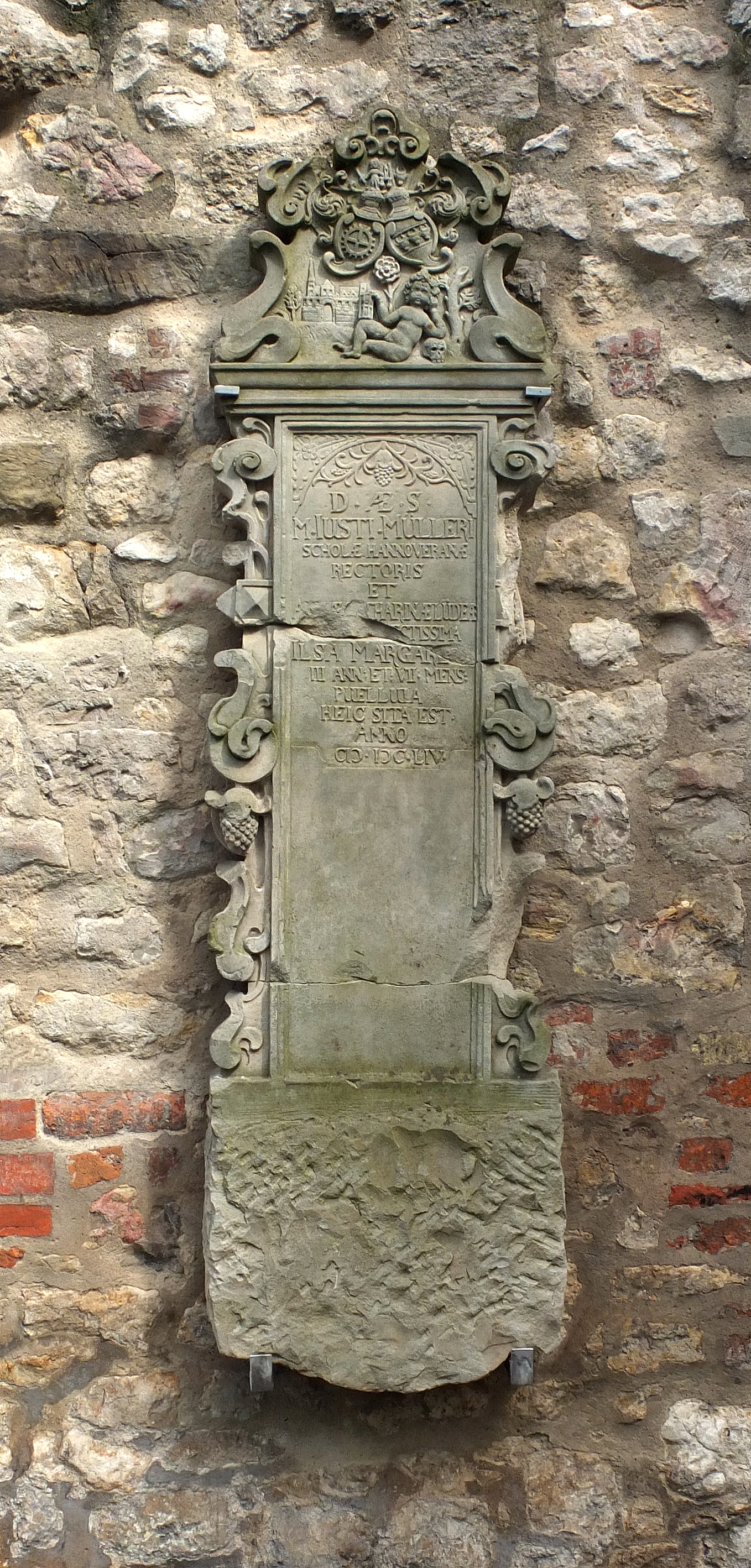
Epitaph for ILSA MARGARE[TA?] († 1654), daughter of Justus Müller and his wife

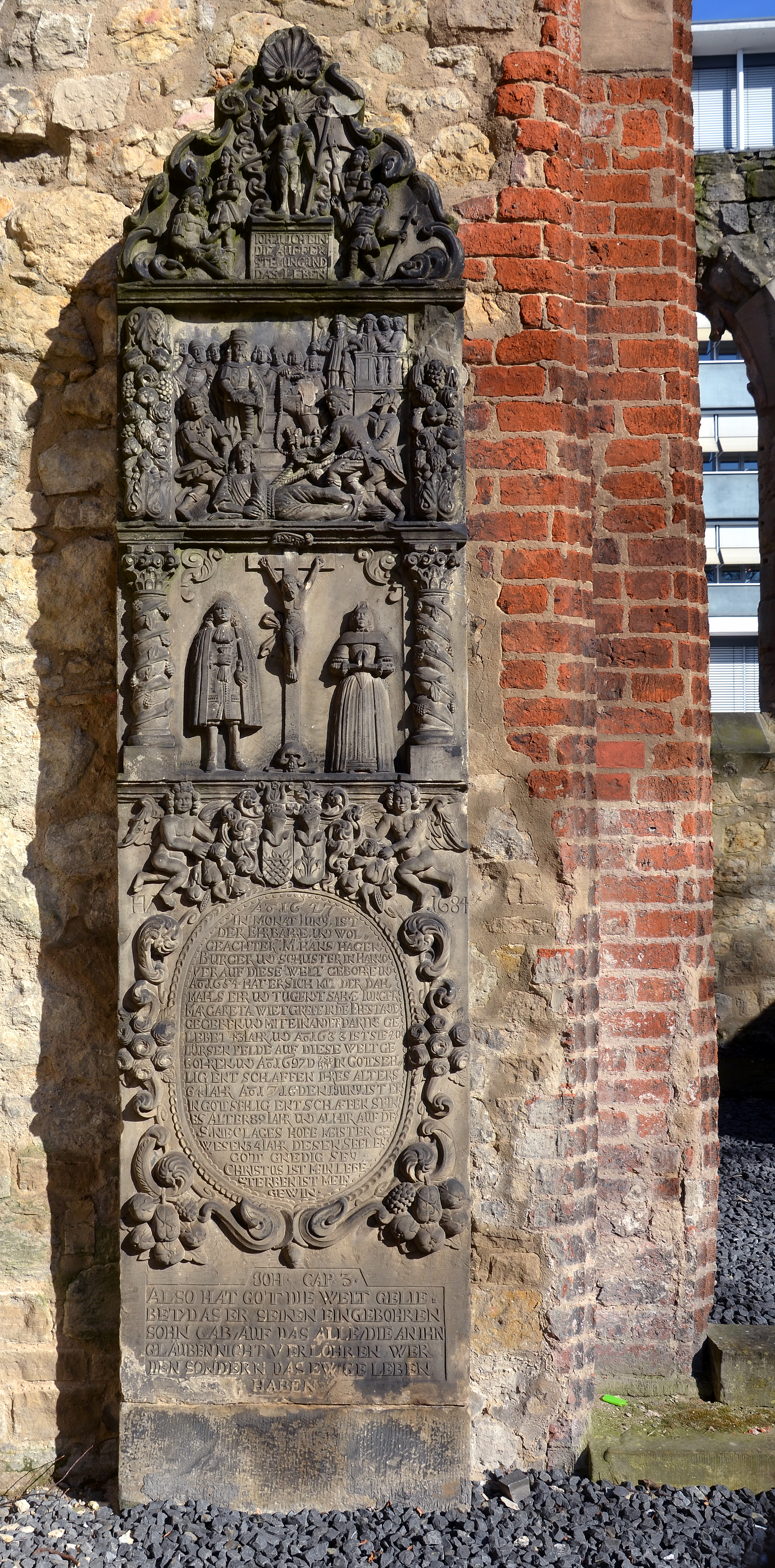
Epitaph for shoemaker Hans Hagen (1627–1716) and his wife Margareta Wietgrefe (1633–1697), signed "H. J. U." for the sculptor Hans Jacob Uhle

== See also ==
- Rudolf Hillebrecht

== General references ==
- Anthes, Ralph. "Hannover - Zentrum - Rund um das Steintor – Nikolaikapelle (nördlich vom Steintor)". stadthistorie.info (in German). Archived from the original on 10 January 2017.
- Bornemann, Andreas-Andrew. "Die Nikolai-Kapelle". Postkarten-Archiv (in German). Archived from the original on 9 January 2020.
- Meding, Conrad von (18 November 2012). "Bagger reißt Gräber am Nikolaifriedhof auf". Hannoversche Allgemeine (in German). Archived from the original on 28 November 2012.
- Meding, Conrad von (11 May 2016). "Knochenfund an der Nikolaikapelle wird untersucht". Hannoversche Allgemeine (in German). Archived from the original on 11 May 2016.
