= Aegidienkirche, Hanover =

War Memorial in Hanover, Lower Saxony

Aegidien Church
- Aegidienkirche
- City of Hanover; Market Church parish
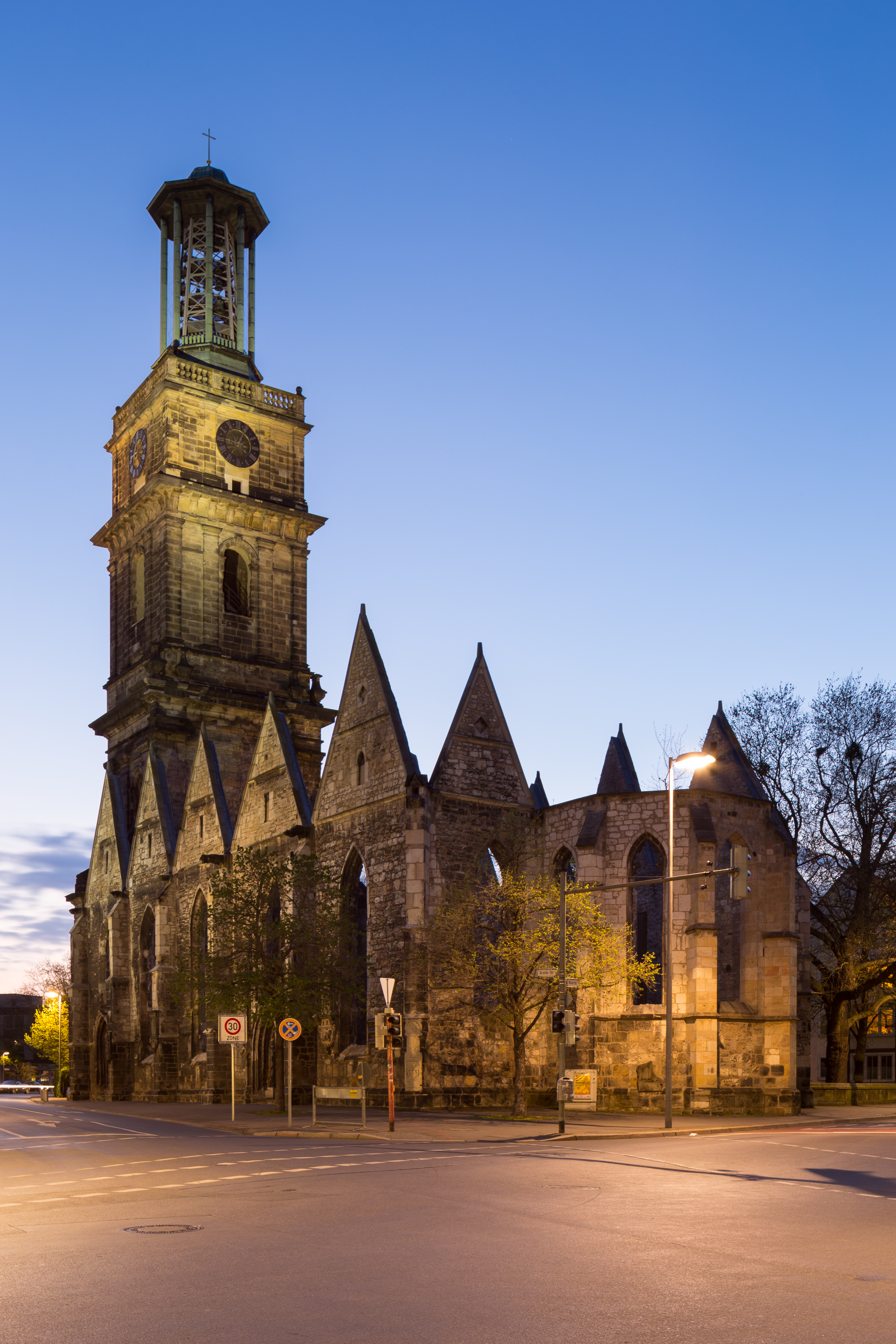
- As seen from south-east, across the traffic lights at the intersection of Breite Strasse and Osterstrasse
- For the victims of war and of violence
- Established: 1347
- Location: Hanover
- Website: www.aegidienkirche-hannover.de
- An early-Romanesque chapel and a Romanesque church stood here before 1350. Construction of this church started in 1347. The tower was built in 1717 to plans by Sudfeld Vick. Destroyed in 1943, since 1952 the ruined church serves as memorial for the victims of war and of violence.
- Aegidienkirche
- Aegidien Church is situated in the old town (●) shown within the approximate location of the former 13th-century defensive wall encircling it.
- 52°22′9.85″N 9°44′21.48″E
- Location: Hanover
- Country: Germany
- Denomination: Lutheran
- Previous denomination: Catholic

History
- Status: War memorial

Architecture
- Style: Gothic
- Groundbreaking: 1347

Administration
- Deanery: Hanover City
- Parish: Marktkirche

Aegidien Church (German: Aegidienkirche), after Saint Giles to whom the church was dedicated, is a war memorial in Hanover, the capital of Lower Saxony, Germany. The church dates from 1347, when it replaced an older Romanesque church dating to 1163. This in turn replaced an even earlier chapel. Aegidien Church was destroyed during the night beginning 8 October 1943 by aerial bombings of Hanover during World War II. In 1952, Aegidien Church became a war memorial dedicated to victims of war and of violence.

== History ==
In 1952, the present Gothic building was inaugurated as a war memorial, in part reconstructed with sandstone from the Deister, a chain of hills about 25 kilometres (16 mi) southwest of Aegidien Church. It was originally completed in 1347 as a church dedicated to Saint Giles, one of the Fourteen Holy Helpers. It replaced a Romanesque church built in 1156–63 at the same site in the old town of Hanover, which replaced an early Romanesque chapel thought to have been constructed around the turn of the first millennium.

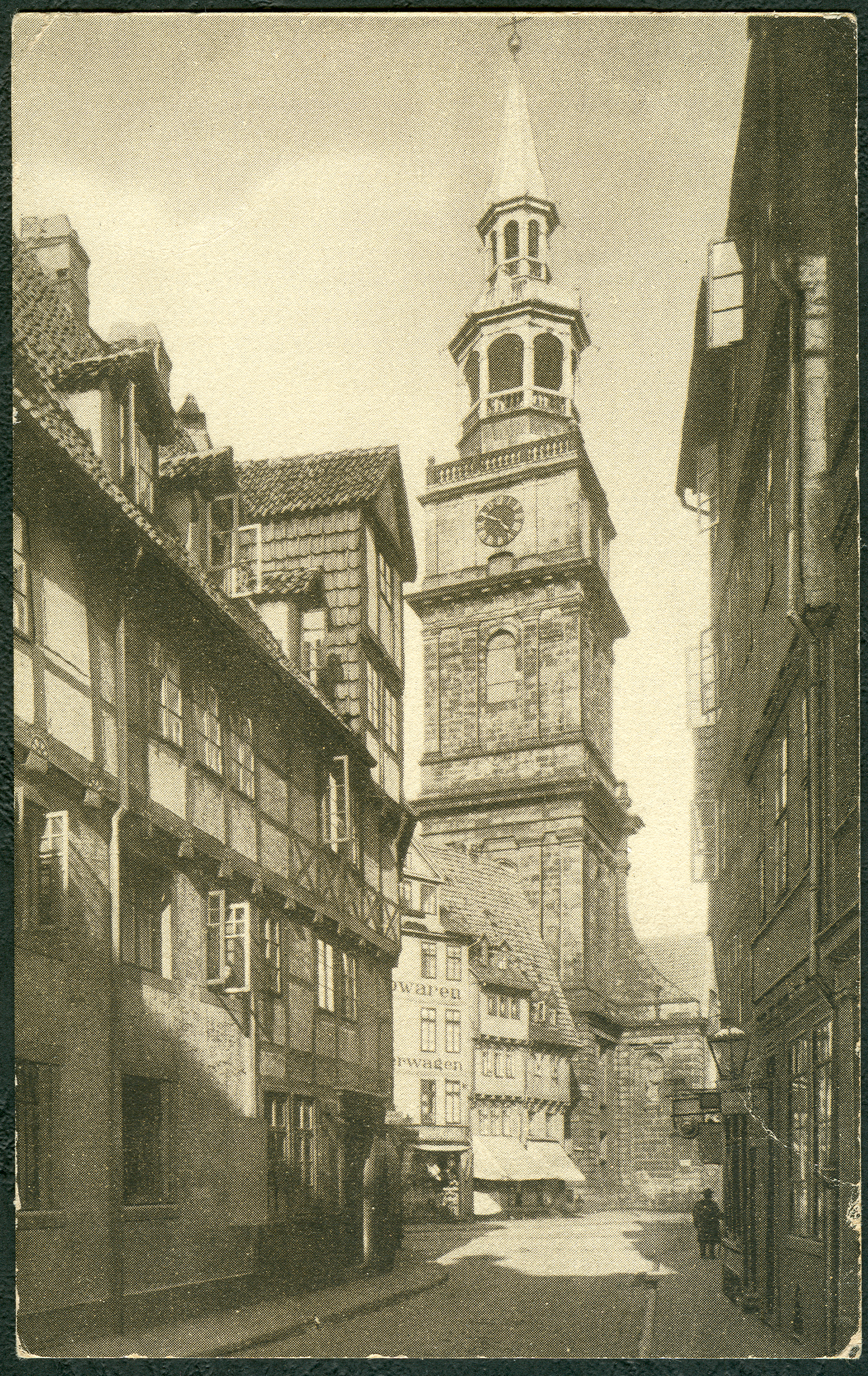
View from west, c. 1910

In 1703–11, Sudfeld Vick designed the Baroque facade with which the steeple was decorated, and in 1826 Georg Ludwig Friedrich Laves used cast iron columns to remodel the interior of the church. Like the other two churches in the old town, the Market Church and the Church of the Holy Cross, Aegidien Church was destroyed along with most of the old town in 1943. The only two items in its interior that survived destruction are the brass baptismal font dating to 1490 (now located in the Market Church), and three chandeliers that are now located in the Church of the Holy Cross. However, several Baroque epitaphs are featured on the outer walls. One of these shows Susanna Magdalena Oldekop, who died in 1648 as a child, with an angel. Also featured is a copy of the Spartan Stone, a relief of seven praying men who, according to legend, died at the Döhren Tower defending the town in 1480; the original is now kept in the Hanover Historical Museum.

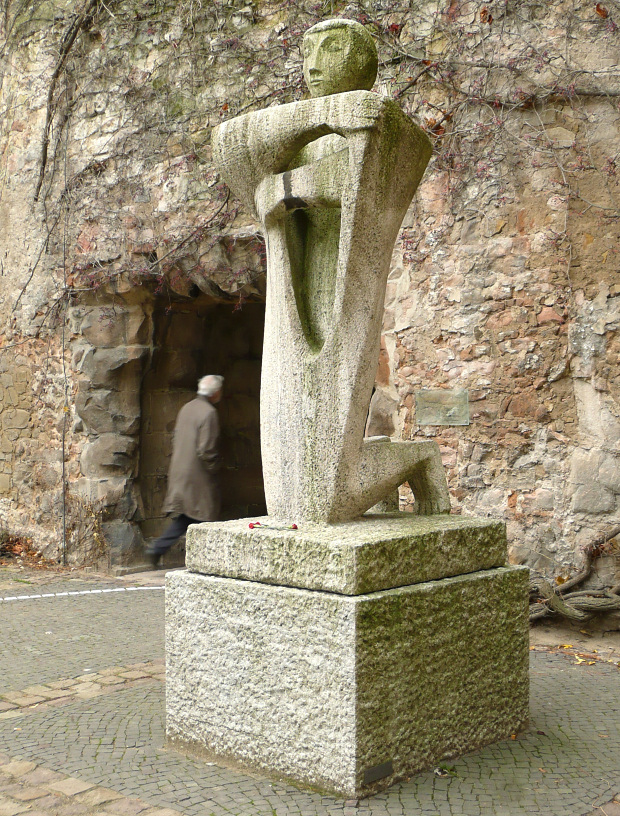
Humility (Demut) by Kurt Lehmann

In 1959 Kurt Lehmann designed a monumental sculpture called Humility (Demut) for the interior of Aegidien Church, which became part of the Market Church parish in 1982.

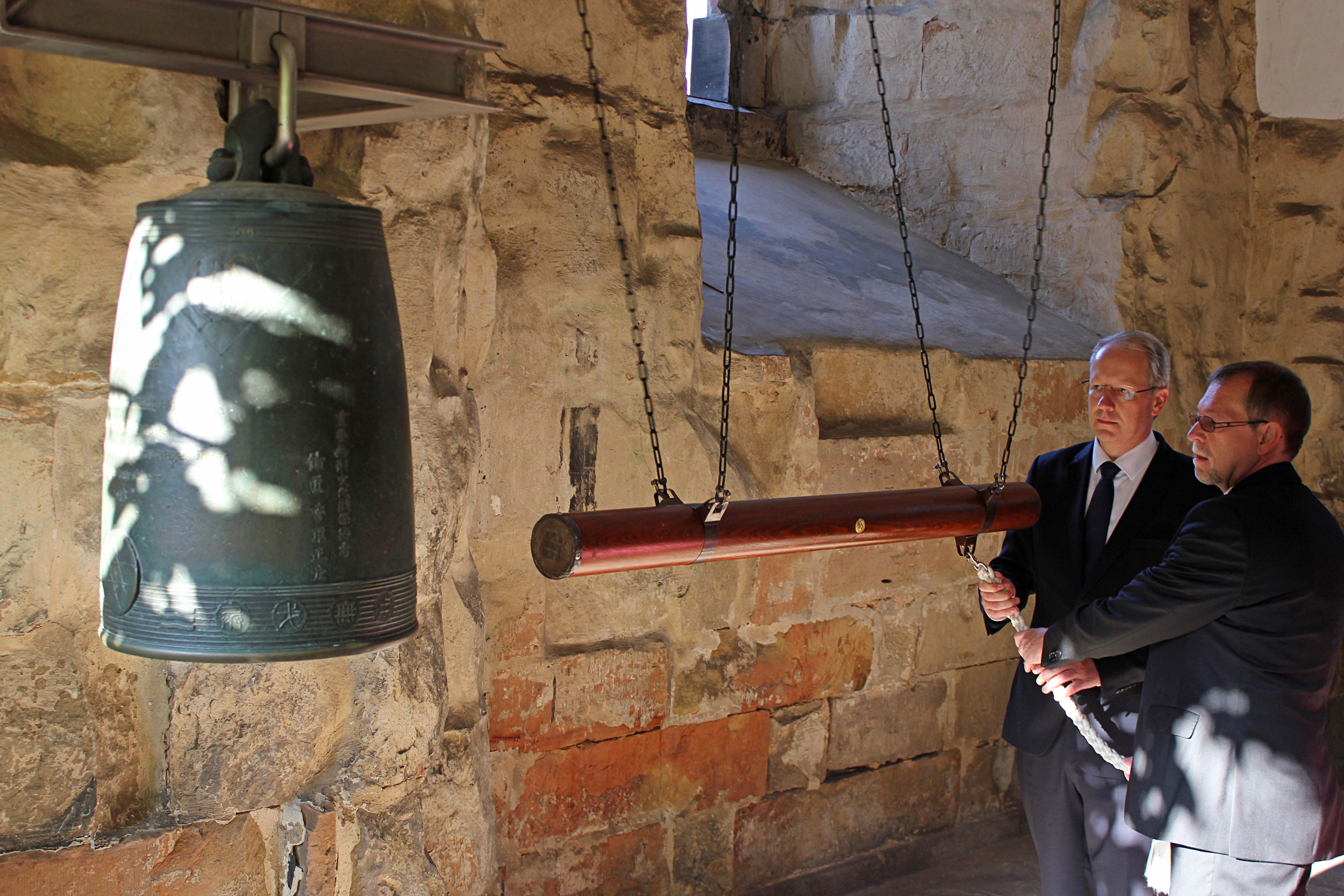
Peace bell on 6 August 2014, with mayor Stefan Schostok and superintendent Thomas Höflich

Hiroshima, a twin town of Hanover since 1983, donated the peace bell (Japanese: bonshō) close to the tower in 1985. It is used in an annual service on Hiroshima Day (6 August).

== General references ==
- Kokkelink, Günther (1968). "Restaurierung der Aegidienkirche 1886–1887". Conrad Wilhelm Hase, Baumeister des Historismus. Exhibition held 24 September to 27 October 1968 (in German). Hanover: Historisches Museum am Hohen Ufer. p. 41. OCLC 3540334. OL 4660556M.
- Knocke, Helmut; Thielen, Hugo (1995). Hannover Kunst- und Kultur-Lexikon (in German) (3rd ed.). Hanover: Schäfer. pp. 61–63. ISBN 3-88746-313-7. OCLC 258561223.
- Aust, Sascha (2005). "Marktkirche – Aegidienkirche – Kreuzkirche – Nikolaikapelle. Merkmale mittelalterlicher hannoverscher Stadtgeschichte". In Kunze, Martin-G. (ed.). Kirchen, Klöster, Kapellen in der Region Hannover. Photographs by Thomas Langreder. Hanover: Lutherisches Verlagshaus. pp. 13–22. ISBN 3-7859-0924-1. OCLC 68628531.
- Leonhardt, Heinrich Hermann (1947). Die St-Aegidien-Kirche zu Hannover im Wandel von sechs Jahrhunderten (in German). Hanover: Kirchenvorstand der St.-Aegidienkirche. OCLC 179870096.
- Nöldeke, Arnold; Institut für Denkmalpflege, eds. (1979) [1932]. Die Kunstdenkmäler der Provinz Hannover (in German). Vol. 1. Provinzialverwaltung, Theodor Schulzes Buchhandlung. Osnabrück: Wenner. pp. 115–130. ISBN 3-87898-151-1. OCLC 667644720 – via University of Toronto.
- Plath, Helmut (1953). "Die Ausgrabung in der Ägidienkirche zu Hannover. Ein Beitrag zur Bau- und Frühgeschichte der Stadt Hannover". Hannoversche Geschichtsblätter (6): 3–86.
