= Marktkirche, Hanover =

Church in Hanover, Lower Saxony

Marktkirche
- Marktkirche St. Georgii et Jacobi
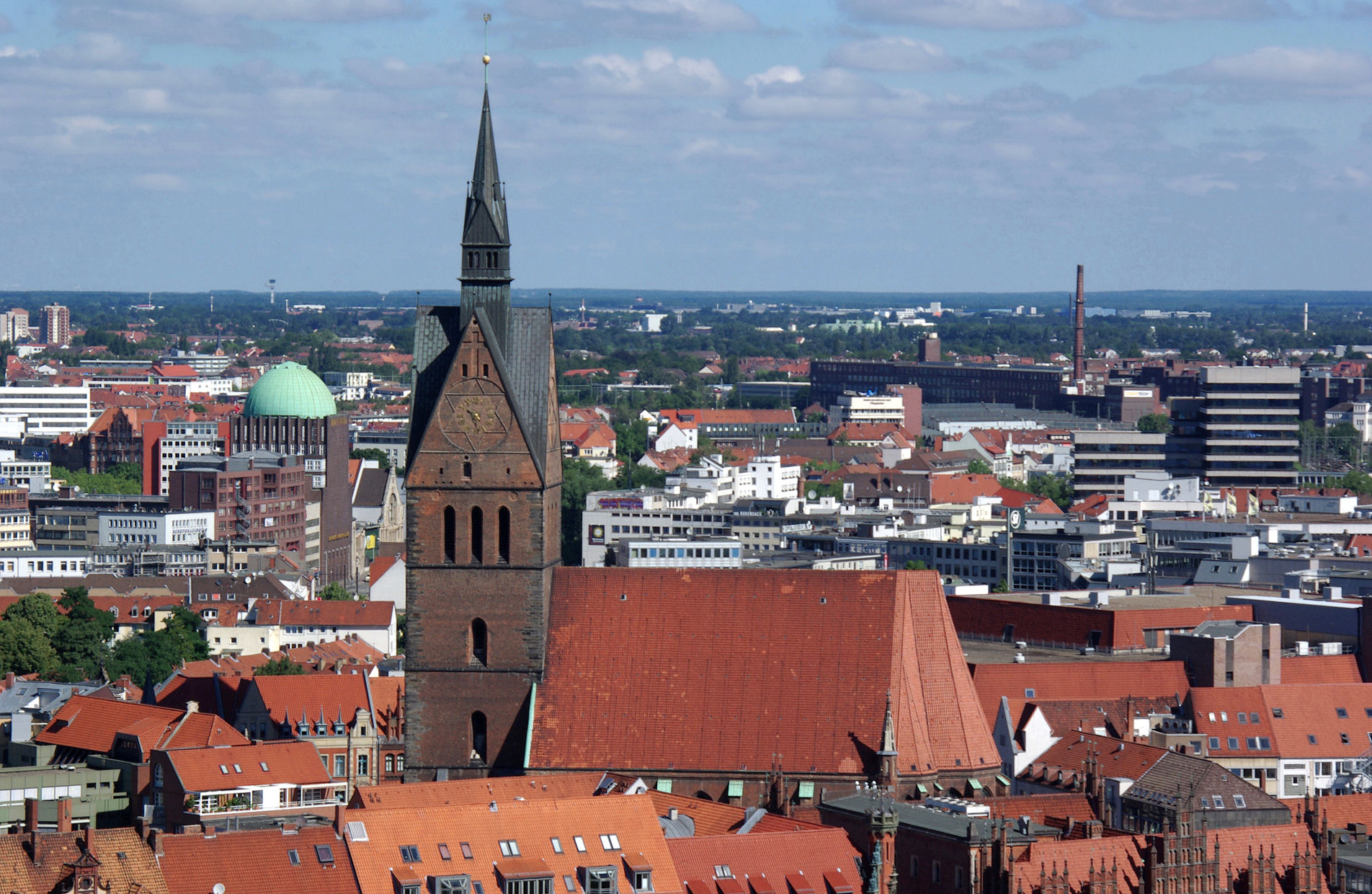
- Market Church seen from the observation platform of the New Town Hall
- Market Church and the approximate location of the former 13th-century defensive wall encircling the old town (●) that grew around the church and the market place next to it
- 52°22′18″N 9°44′07″E
- Location: Hanover
- Country: Germany
- Denomination: Lutheranism
- Previous denomination: Roman Catholicism
- Website: www.marktkirche-hannover.de

History
- Status: Parish church; Bishop's preaching venue
- Dedication: Saint George; James, son of Zebedee
- Consecrated: ~ 1360

Architecture
- Functional status: Active
- Architectural type: Hall church
- Style: Brick Gothic
- Groundbreaking: 1347
- Completed: 1366

Specifications
- Length: 61.5 metres (202 ft)
- Width: 26.6 metres (87 ft)
- Materials: Brick

Administration
- Deanery: Hanover City (Stadtkirchenverband)
- Parish: Marktkirchengemeinde, Hanover

The Market Church (German: Marktkirche, meaning 'church at the market place') is the main Lutheran church in Hanover, Germany. Built in the 14th century, it was referred to in 1342 as the church of Saints James and George (Latin: ecclesia sanctorum Jacobi et Georgii) in dedication to Saint James the Elder and Saint George. Replacing an older, smaller church at the same location that dated to 1125 and that is known to have been called St. Georgii (after Saint George) in 1238, Hanover grew around the structure and the market place situated immediately adjacent to its south that was established around the same time. Today the official name of the church is Market Church of Saints George and James (Marktkirche St. Georgii et Jacobi), and along with the nearby Old Town Hall is considered the southernmost example of the northern German brick gothic architectural style (norddeutsche Backsteingotik).

A hall church with a monumental saddleback roof that rises above the nave and two aisles, the roof and the vaults of the naves were restored in 1952 after being destroyed in an air raid in 1943. Its tower, situated on its western side and a symbol of the power and wealth of the citizens of the town when built, is both a landmark of Hanover and, 638 years after its roof was first constructed, one of the highest towers in Lower Saxony.

== Altar ==
The main altar was carved of linden wood around 1480. Its front depicts the Passion of Christ in 21 scenes following models of Martin Schongauer, while its back shows scenes from the lives of the two patron saints, Saint George and Saint James. Moved to the Aegidienkirche in 1663 to make room for a Baroque altar, the altar was taken to the Welfenmuseum in 1856 and thus spared destruction during World War II when the Aegidienkirche was bombed. It was returned to the Market Church in 1952.

== Organ ==
An organ was installed in the tower room (Turmraum) in 1893, which included parts of an instrument of the 17th century. This organ was destroyed in World War II.

Today's main organ is at the back wall of the southern aisle. The first instrument in that location was built from 1953 to 1954 by the organ builders Emil Hammer Orgelbau and Rudolf von Beckerath. It had 61 stops, four manuals and pedal. The casing (Prospekt) was designed by Dieter Oesterlen and is a protected monument.

From 2007 to 2009, the instrument was rebuilt by Orgelbau Goll in Lucerne. The casing and about half of the pipes were kept. The new organ has 64 stops, 39 of them mostly using the older material.

== Bells ==
The tower has 11 bells hung on a steel frame including 2 bourdon bells. Among them is a bourdon called the Christus-und Friedensglocke, 'Christ and Peace bell'. It is the biggest bell in Lower Saxony, and is used on special occasions only. The second bourdon, called Großer David, 'Big David', was originally donated by Pastor David Meyer for the Church of the Cross and only came to the Market Church after the Second World War. In Germany, the bells are always numbered from largest to smallest; bell 1 is always the tenor or bourdon.

No.	Name (German)	Name (English)	Casting year	Foundry, casting site	Weight (kg)
1	Christus-und Friedensglocke	Christ and Peace bell (Bourdon)	1960	Friedrich Wilhelm Schilling, Heidelberg	10360
2	Großer David	Big David (2nd Bourdon)	1650	Ludolph Siegfriedt, Hanover	3800
3	Marienglocke	Mary's bell	1951	Friedrich Wilhelm Schilling, Heidelberg	2462
4	Georgenglocke	George's bell	1653	Ludolph Siegfriedt, Hanover	1800
5	Vaterunserglocke	Lord's Prayer bell	1951	Friedrich Wilhelm Schilling, Heidelberg	1380
6	Morgenglocke	Morning bell	1959	Friedrich Wilhelm Schilling, Heidelberg	1050
7	Jakobusglocke	St. James' bell	1951	Friedrich Wilhelm Schilling, Heidelberg	623
8	Taufglocke	Baptismal bell	1951	Friedrich Wilhelm Schilling, Heidelberg	358
9	Ewigkeitsglocke	Eternity bell	1959	Friedrich Wilhelm Schilling, Heidelberg	340
10	Liedglocke	Song bell	1951	Friedrich Wilhelm Schilling, Heidelberg	237
11	Thomasglocke	Thomas bell	1733	Thomas Riedeweg, Hanover	140

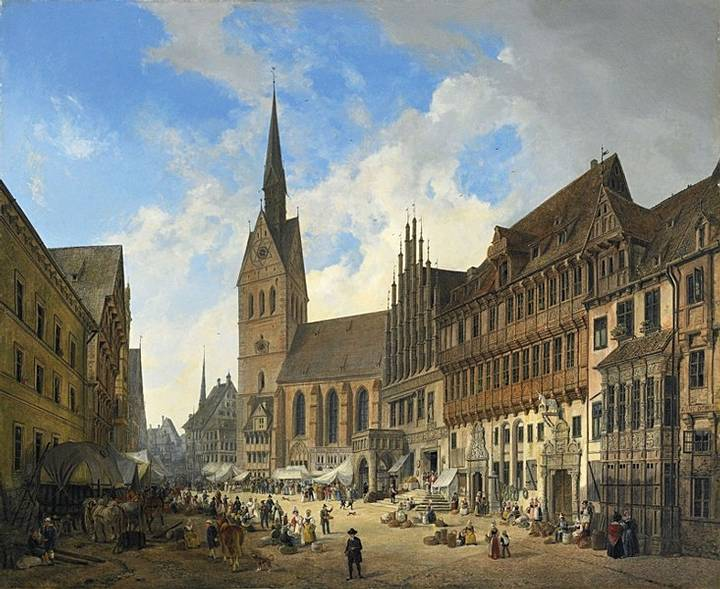
Early 19th century

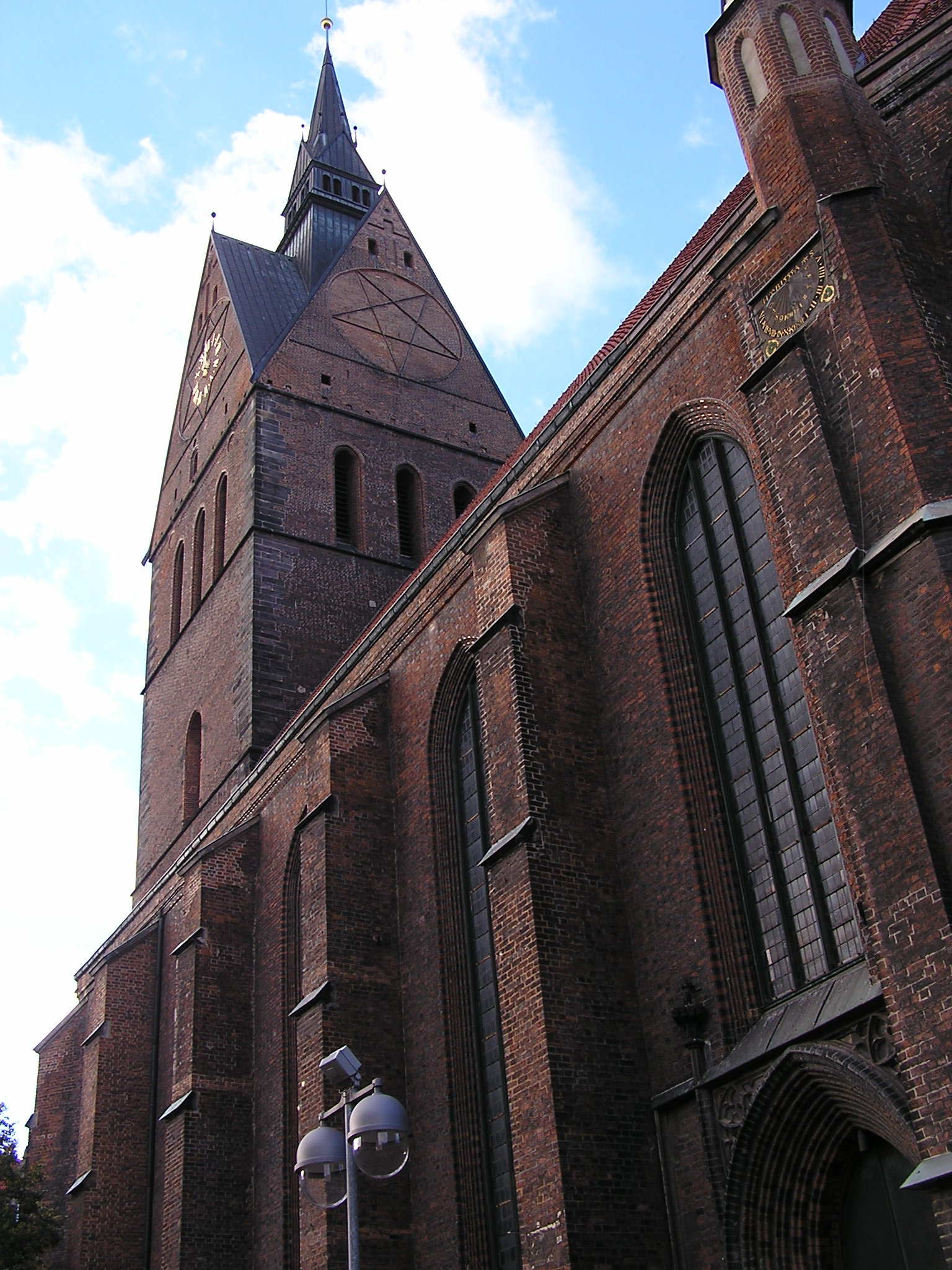
Exterior, 2004

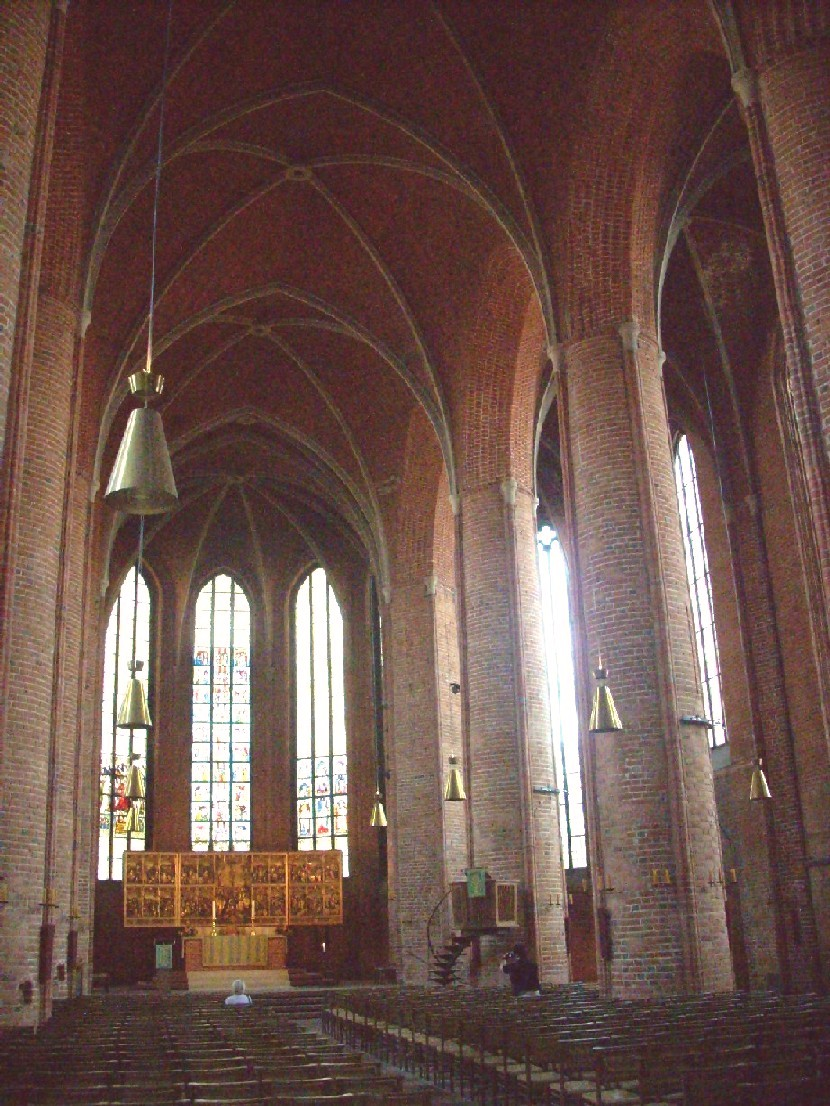
Interior, 2007
