= Bombing of Hanover in World War II =

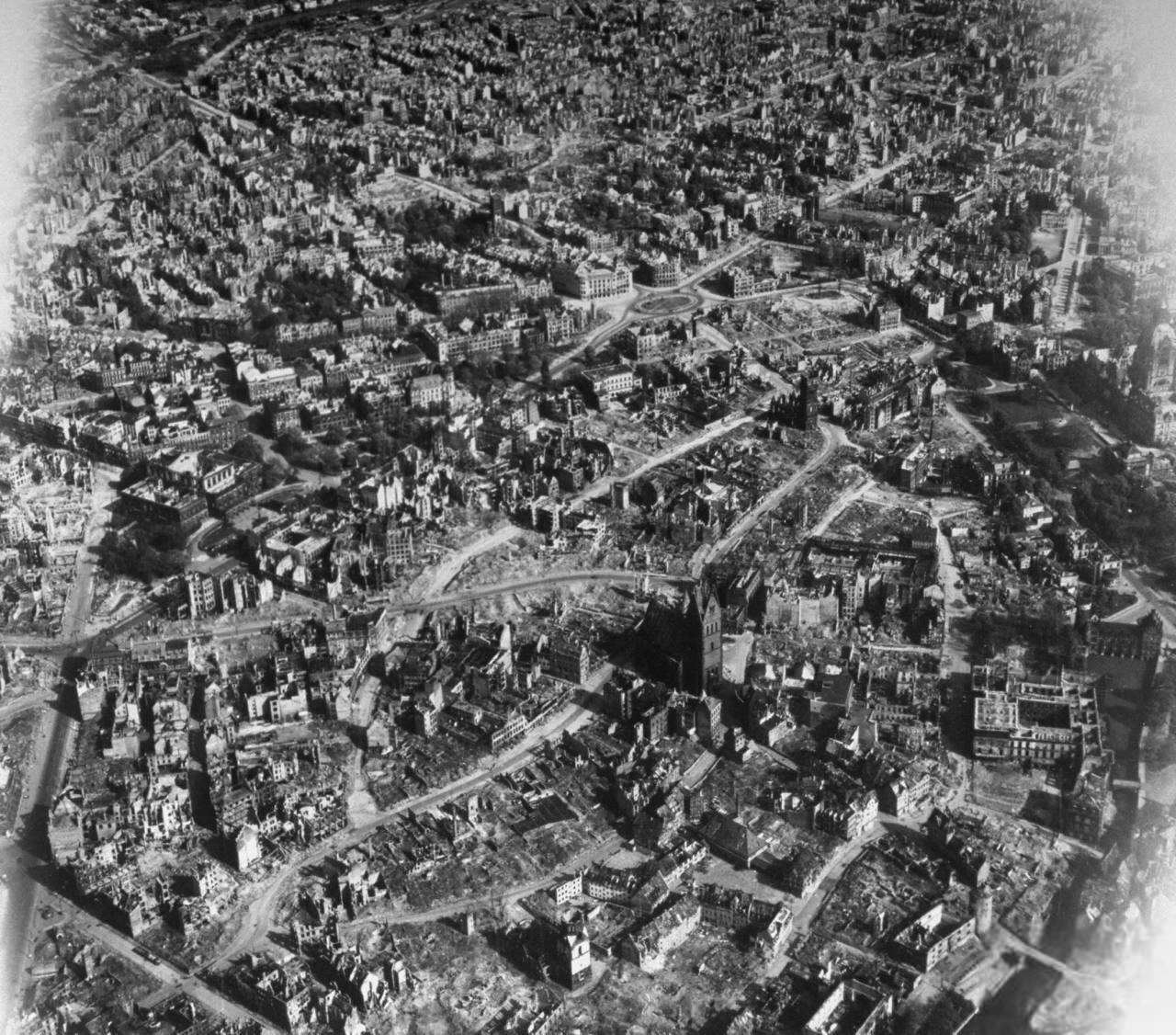
Hanover city centre in 1945, photographed from northwest by Margaret Bourke-White travelling through Germany with the USAAF and General Patton. The Market Church at the centre of the historic old town of, at the time, half-timbered buildings is just off the centre of the photograph.

The aerial bombings of Hanover are a series of eighty-eight air raids by Royal Air Force (RAF) Bomber Command and the United States Army Air Forces (USAAF) on the German city of Hanover during World War II. Collectively these air raids killed 6,782 persons, predominantly civilian residents. Around 1,000 aerial mines, 34,000 high explosive bombs, 900,000 incendiary bombs and 50,000 fire bombs were dropped. The most destructive and deadly air raid on Hanover was conducted by the RAF on the night beginning 8 October 1943, killing 1,245 persons, and is an example of carpet bombing of suburban and residential civilian targets laid out in the Area Bombing Directive of 14 February 1942.

At the end of the war, 90% of the city centre was destroyed, with 52% of buildings heavily damaged or completely destroyed. A total of 7.5 million cubic metres (260 million cubic feet) of rubble had to be removed. Of the 147,222 dwellings recorded at the end of 1939, 51.2% were heavily damaged or destroyed, 43.6% lightly or moderately damaged and only 7,489 dwellings (5.2%) completely undamaged. The Aegidien Church and St. Nicholas' Chapel were both destroyed and became memorials after the war rather than be reconstructed.

== Strategic importance ==
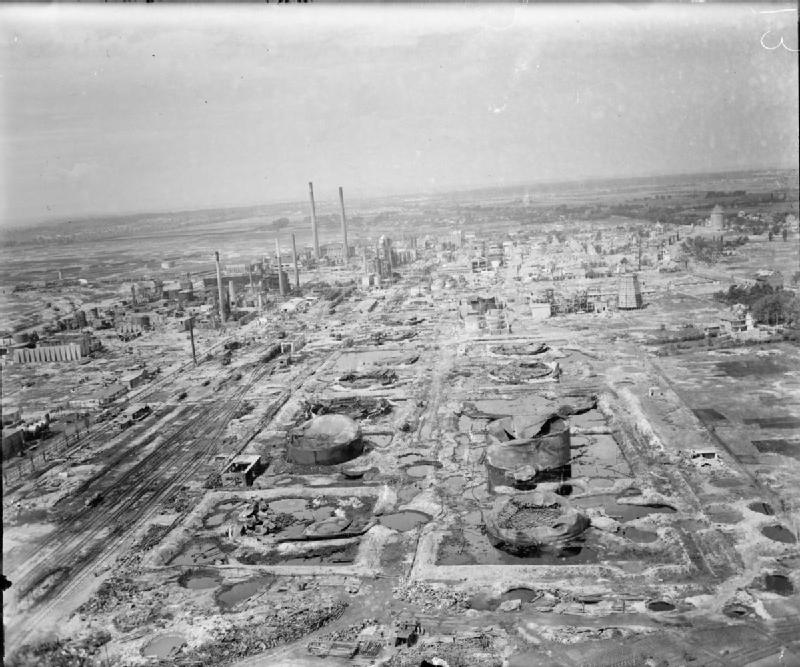
The Deurag-Nerag refineries at the end of the war

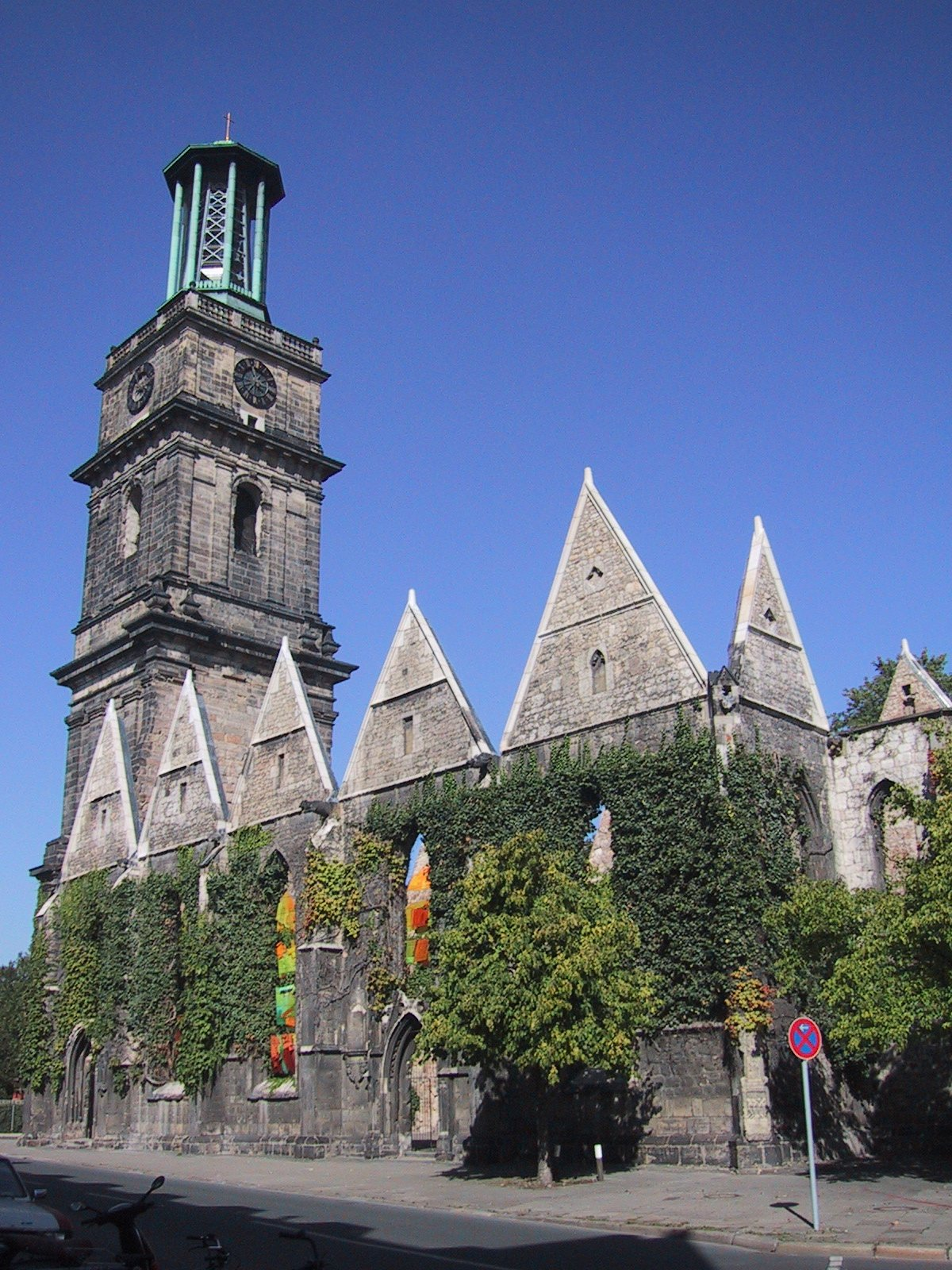
In 1952 Aegidien Church became a war memorial dedicated to victims of war and of violence.

Before the war Hanover was the thirteenth largest city in Germany and Austria, with 471,000 inhabitants – on average this fell to 287,000 during the war (mainly due to evacuations) and in May 1945 was down to 217,000. It was the headquarters of 19th Infantry Division, military district XI and a military training facility.

Hanover was an important railway junction at the intersection of two major east-west and north-south routes. It was the fifth most active industrial centre in the Third Reich, producing tyres for military vehicles and aircraft and other rubber parts and products in three Continental AG factories. Its Maschinenfabrik Niedersachsen Hannover and Hanomag factories also produced guns and tracked-vehicles, whilst an AFA (Accumulatoren Fabrik Aktiengesellschaft – later VARTA) factory built in 1938 produced batteries for submarines and torpedoes from 1940 onwards.

A new Vereinigten Leichtmetallwerke (VLW) factory had been built in 1935 on a site in the Linden-Süd district formerly used by the Hannoversche Waggonfabrik after the latter went bankrupt. The VLW also built a factory in Laatzen outside the city limits in 1936 which was not directly attacked. Two large refineries Deurag and Nerag in Misburg on the northeastern outskirts of the city produced aviation fuel and motor oils for the Luftwaffe, meaning they were targeted early and continued to be attacked, especially later on in the war.

== Raids ==
Raids on Hanover involved a relatively short flying-time from bases in the United Kingdom and the nearby Steinhuder Meer provided a useful navigational aid. The 78-hectare (190-acre) Maschsee on the southern edge of the city centre was partly covered with wooden boards and artificial islands to make it less recognizable from the air, but the geometrical patterns in the 50-hectare (120-acre) Great Garden (Großer Garten) in the Herrenhausen Gardens (Herrenhäuser Gärten) remained undisguised and were used by the RAF's H2S radar from mid-1943 onwards.

=== 1939 and 1940 ===
The first raid was on 4 September 1939, the day after the British declaration of war – it involved just one RAF Armstrong Whitworth Whitley dropping leaflets. On 19 May 1940 the RAF bombed the Misburg refineries, killing nineteen people. 1 August the same year saw the first raid on Hannover itself, with a raid on the Seilerstraße in the south of the city. On 30 September 1940 six planes destroyed several buildings in Wülfel and Linden.

=== 1941 ===
On 10 February 1941, the city was raided by 220 British planes, mainly hitting the eastern district and killing 101 people. Another British raid followed on the night between 15–16 April on the Vahrenwald and Hainholz areas and on 15–16 June on the VLW-Werk factory and the Misburg refineries. Although these raids damaged the factories' productivity, they were repeatedly able to resume production.

=== 26 July 1943 ===
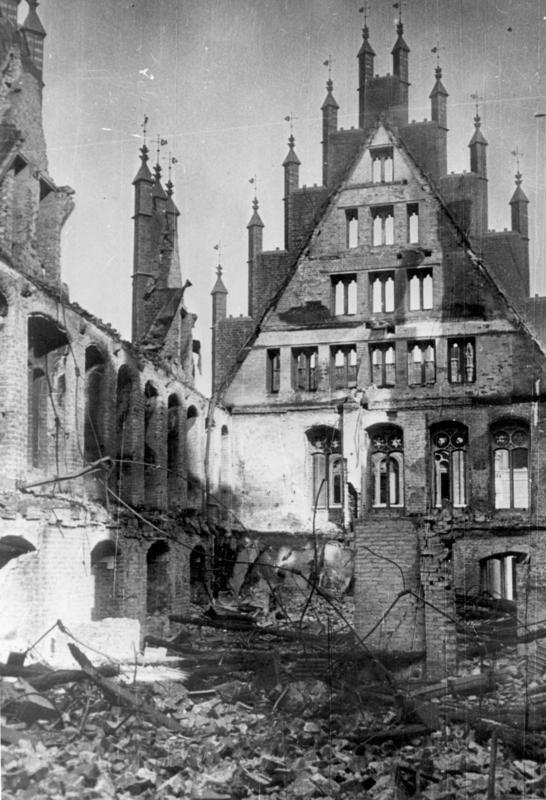
Interior of the Old Town Hall in 1943

On 26 July 1943, as part of a daylight raid on Hamburg the USAAF detached bombardment groups to attack the Conti rubber plant in Hanover. German fighters concentrated their attacks against this raid which lost 22 airplanes. The results of the bombing in Hanover were amplified by the fact that most of the local firemen were sent as reinforcements to Hamburg.

=== 8 October 1943 ===
In the night beginning 8 October 1943, 504 RAF aircraft (comprising Lancasters, Halifaxes, Wellingtons and eight Mosquitos) attacked Hanover. Many German nightfighters arrived before the attack was over and 27 British aircraft were lost. Conditions over Hanover were clear and the Pathfinders marked the centre of the city accurately with all bombs landing within the built-up area.

The Ebstorf Map, the largest medieval map of the world, was destroyed by the raid.

=== 18 October 1943 ===
In the last of the four big raids against Hanover, 360 Lancasters attacked Hannover but the target area was covered by cloud and the raid was inaccurate.

=== 28 March 1945 ===
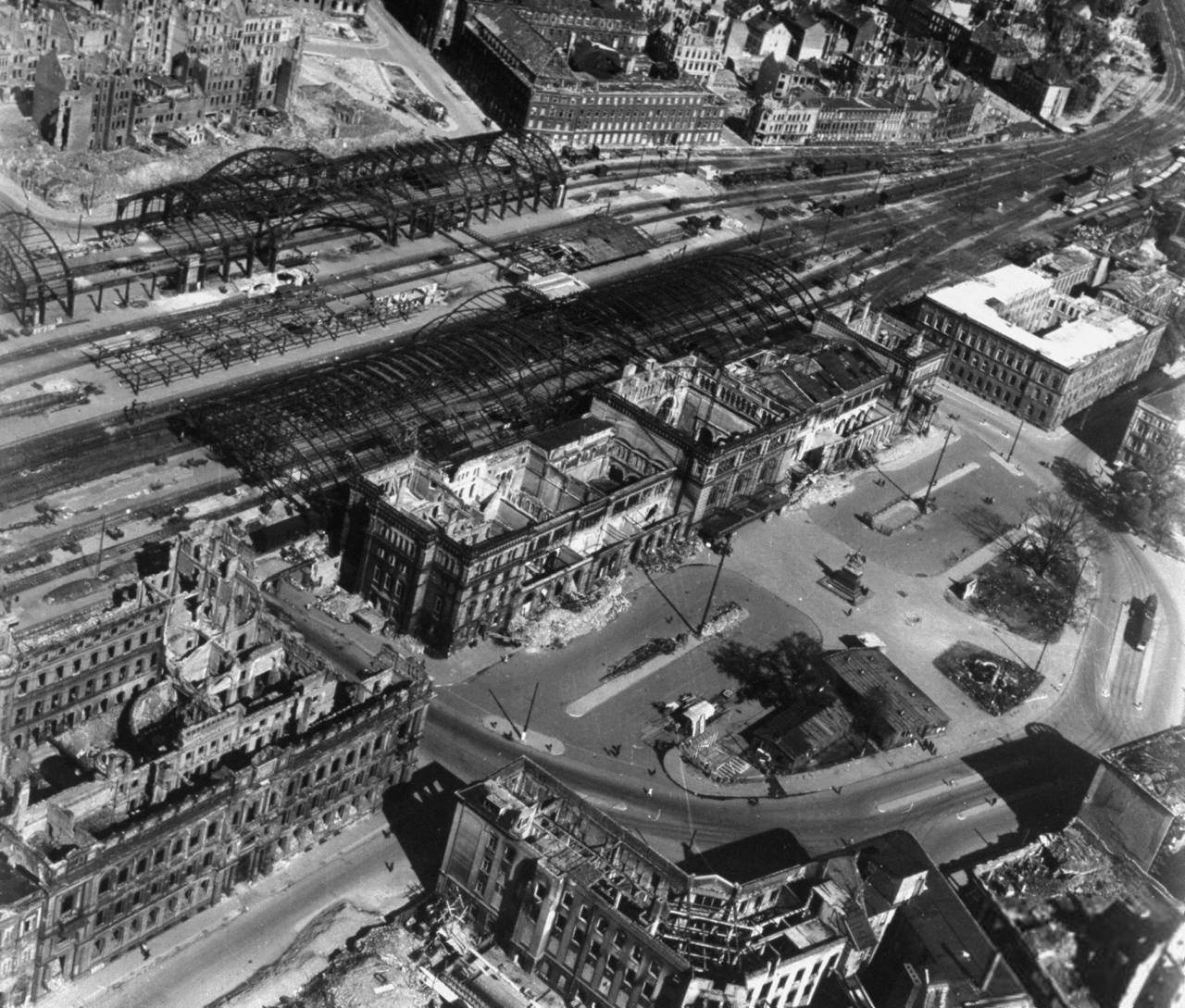
The destroyed main railway station in 1945. To the left are the ruins of the post and telegraph building, now the site of the Ernst-August-Galerie shopping centre.

On the 28th of March 1945, the last major air raid on Hanover took place. The city was hit by multiple bombs from about 400 planes which hit the entire city. The epicentre of the bombing was the city centre.
