= Altstadt =

German language word for "old town"

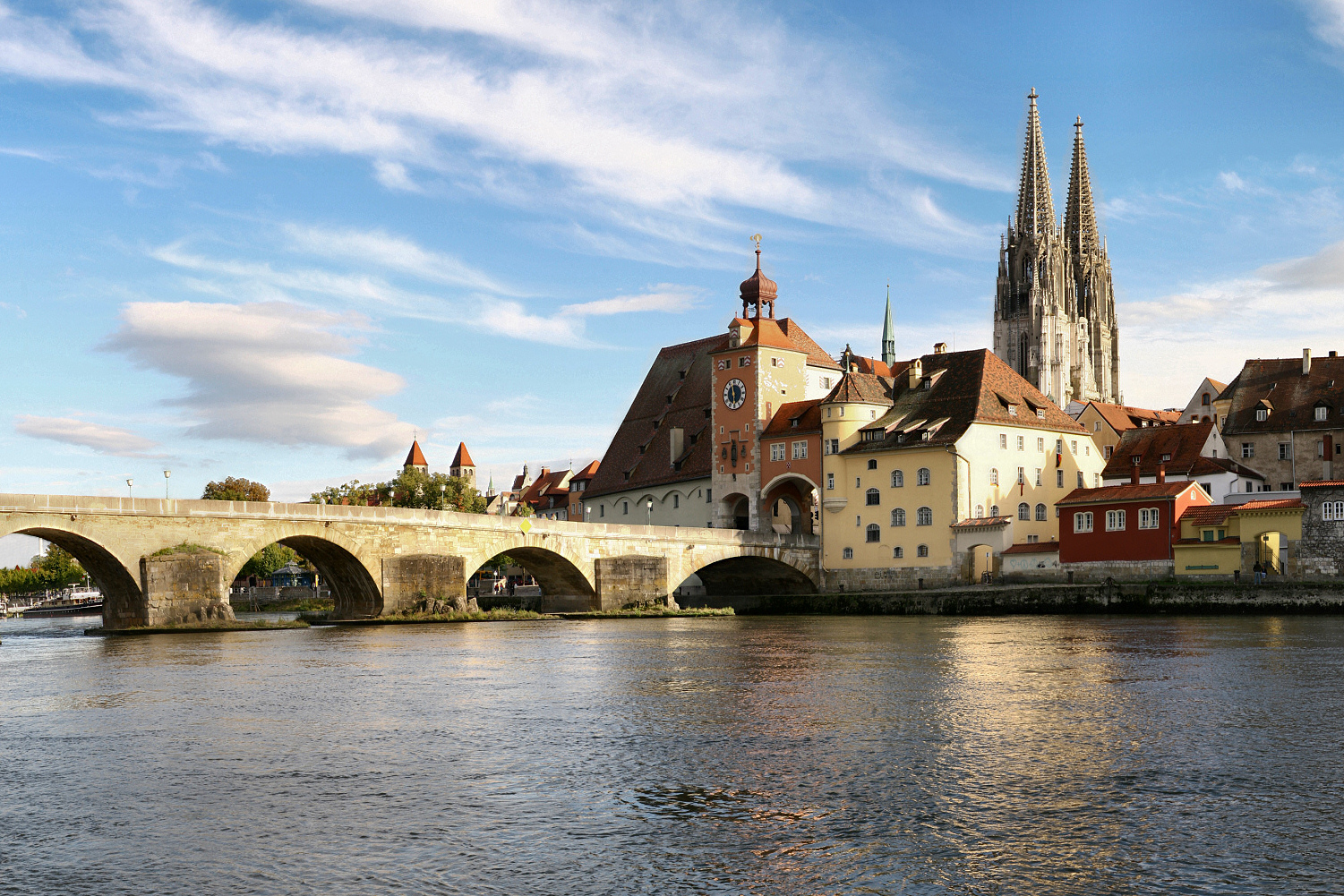
Old Town of Regensburg, Germany (UNESCO World Heritage Site)

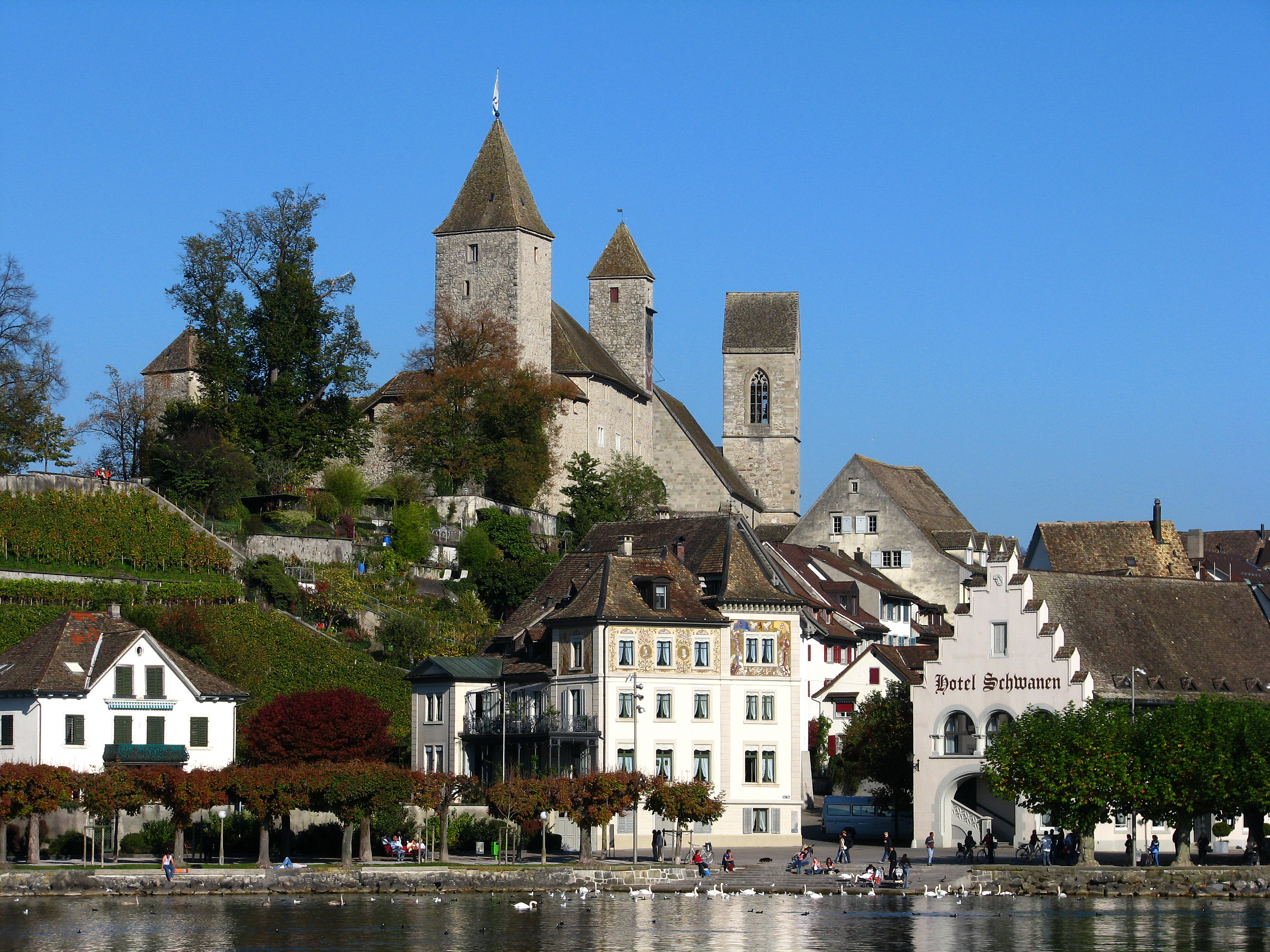
Rapperswil Castle and Altstadt of Rapperswil located at Lake Zürich, Switzerland

Altstadt (German: [ˈaltˌʃtat]) is the German language word for "old town", and generally refers to the historical town or city centre within the old town or city wall, in contrast to younger suburbs outside. Neustadt (new town), the logical opposite of Altstadt, mostly stands for a part of the "Altstadt" in modern sense, sometimes only a few years younger than the oldest part, e. g. a late medieval enlargement.

== Germany ==
Most German towns have an Altstadt, even though the ravages of war have destroyed many of them, especially during the Thirty Years' War (1618–1648). Another notable example was during the Nine Years' War (1688–1697), where Mélac's aggressive tactics devastated many cities and large parts of southwestern Germany, like the Heidelberg Castle.

Allied strategic bombing during World War II destroyed nearly all large cities, with the exception of Regensburg and Heidelberg. Many smaller towns remained intact, for example Bamberg, Konstanz, Passau, Tübingen, Dinkelsbühl, Quedlinburg and Wismar. Some Altstadt parts in Freiburg, Erfurt, Rothenburg ob der Tauber, Weimar and others have been restored. But most destroyed bigger German old towns were not reconstructed. Important old towns like those of Hildesheim, Braunschweig, Frankfurt, Kassel and Pforzheim were largely lost and only a limited smaller part, such as a church or an area around a town square reconstructed.

Recent efforts of Altstadt reconstructions can be found in Dresden (Neumarkt area), Potsdam (the old market and city palace) and Frankfurt (Römerberg around the Cathedral).

== Examples of Altstadt districts in cities and towns ==
=== Austria ===
- Baden bei Wien
- Gmünd, Carinthia
- Gmünd, Lower Austria
- Graz
- Judenburg
- Salzburg
- Schärding
- Steyr
- Zell am See

=== Germany ===
- Aachen
- Amberg
- Baden-Baden
- Bamberg (a World Heritage Site)
- Bayreuth
- Bernkastel-Kues
- Bietigheim-Bissingen
- Büdingen
- Celle
- Cologne (Altstadt Nord & Süd)
- Dinkelsbühl
- Dresden (Dresden old town)
- Düsseldorf (Altstadt (Düsseldorf))
- Erfurt
- Freiburg (de:Altstadt (Freiburg im Breisgau))
- Gernsbach
- Görlitz (de:Görlitzer Altstadt)
- Goslar (a World Heritage Site)
- Güstrow
- Hamburg (Altstadt)
- Heidelberg (de:Heidelberger Altstadt)
- Konstanz
- Landshut
- Limburg an der Lahn
- Lindau
- Lübeck (a World Heritage Site)
- Lüneburg
- Marbach am Neckar
- Marburg
- Mosbach
- Munich (Altstadt (Munich))
- Neustrelitz
- Nuremberg
- Nördlingen
- Putbus
- Quedlinburg (a World Heritage Site)
- Ravensburg
- Regensburg (a World Heritage Site)
- Rostock
- Rothenburg ob der Tauber
- Rüdesheim
- Schwerin
- Stade
- Stralsund (a World Heritage Site)
- Tangermünde
- Trier
- Tübingen
- Überlingen
- Waren (Müritz)
- Weingarten (Baden)
- Weinheim
- Wernigerode
- Wetzlar (de:Historische Altstadt Wetzlar)
- Wismar (a World Heritage Site)

=== Switzerland ===
- Baden (AG)
- Bellinzona
- Bern (UNESCO)
- Biel/Bienne
- Bremgarten (AG)
- Brugg
- Bulle
- Delémont
- Eglisau (ZH)
- Fribourg
- Frauenfeld
- Greifensee (ZH)
- Gruyères
- Kyburg (ZH)
- Lausanne
- Lavaux
- Luzern
- Müstair
- Rapperswil (SG)
- Regensberg (ZH)
- Romont
- Murten
- Rheinau
- Schaffhausen
- Solothurn
- St. Gallen
- Stein am Rhein
- Vevey
- Wil (SG)
- Winterthur
- Zürich

=== Other towns ===
Notable Altstadt districts in cities that used to be inhabited also by a German-speaking population:

- Altstadt Königsberg (Kaliningrad)
- Old Town, Prague
- Old Town, Tallinn

== Gallery ==
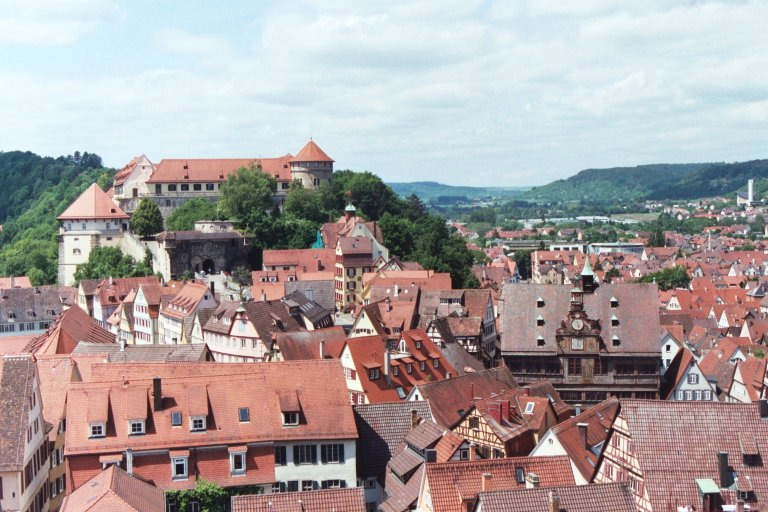
Altstadt of Tübingen, Germany

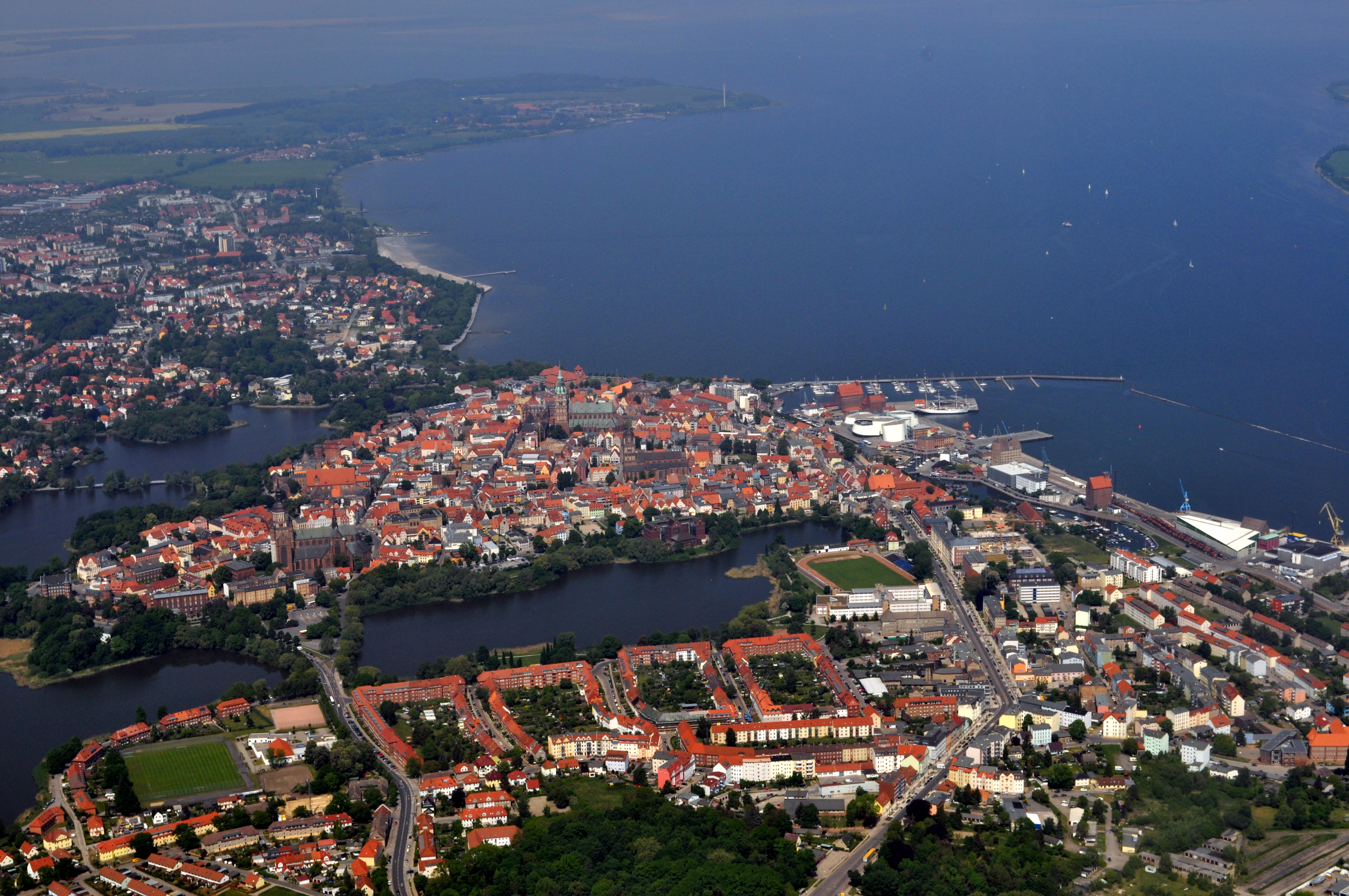
Stralsund, Germany, a UNESCO World Heritage site

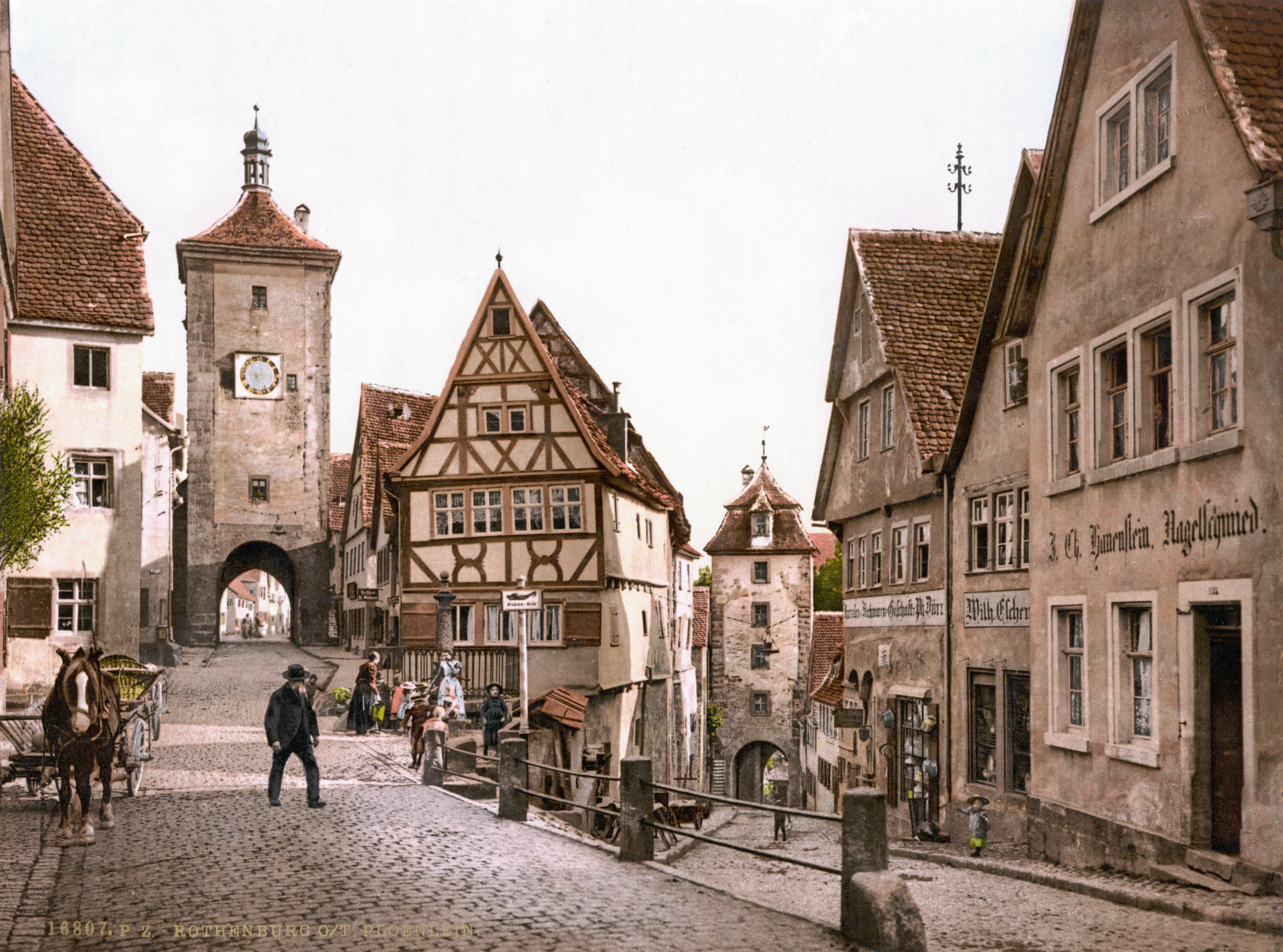
Altstadt of Rothenburg ob der Tauber, Germany, in 1900...

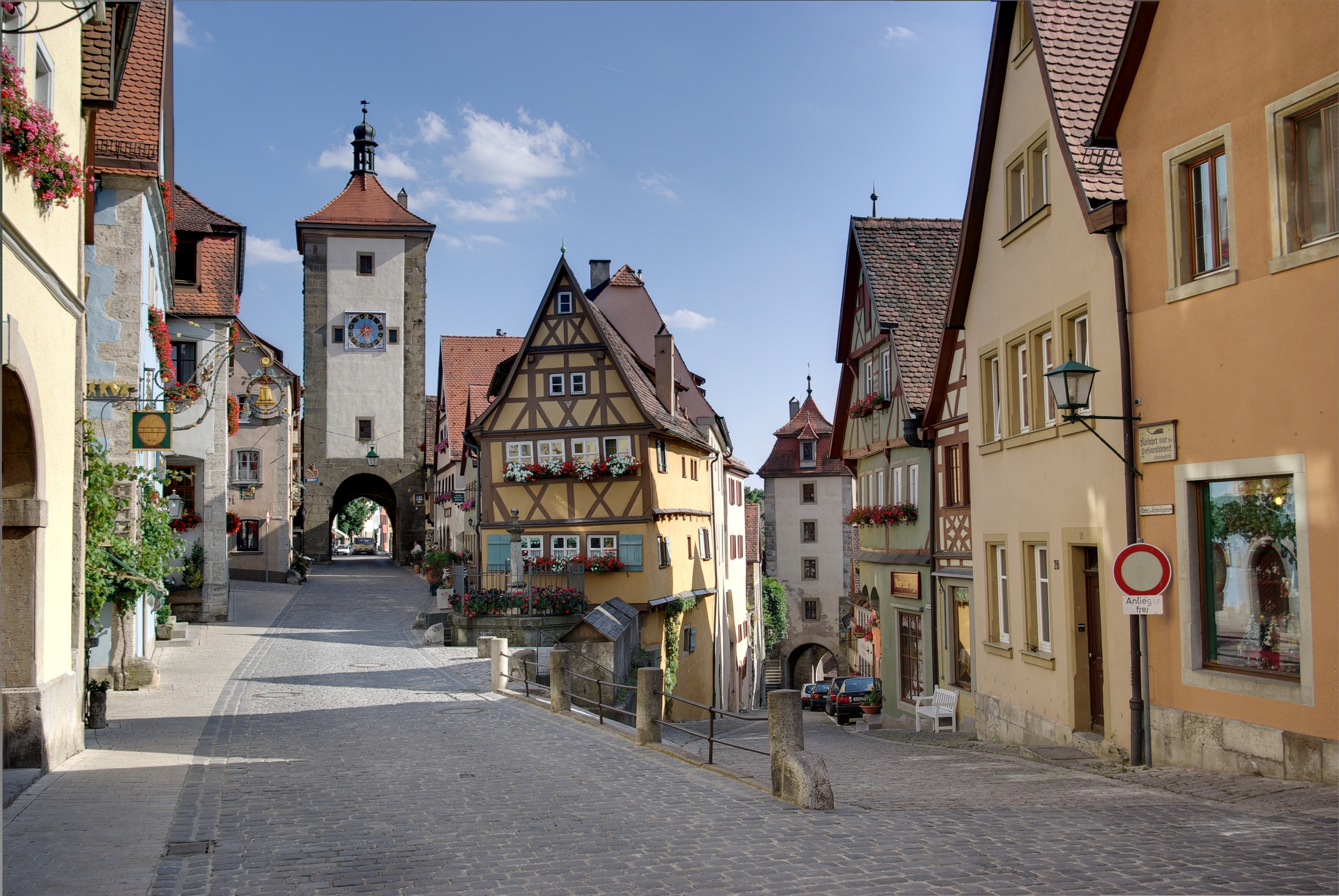
... and in 2008

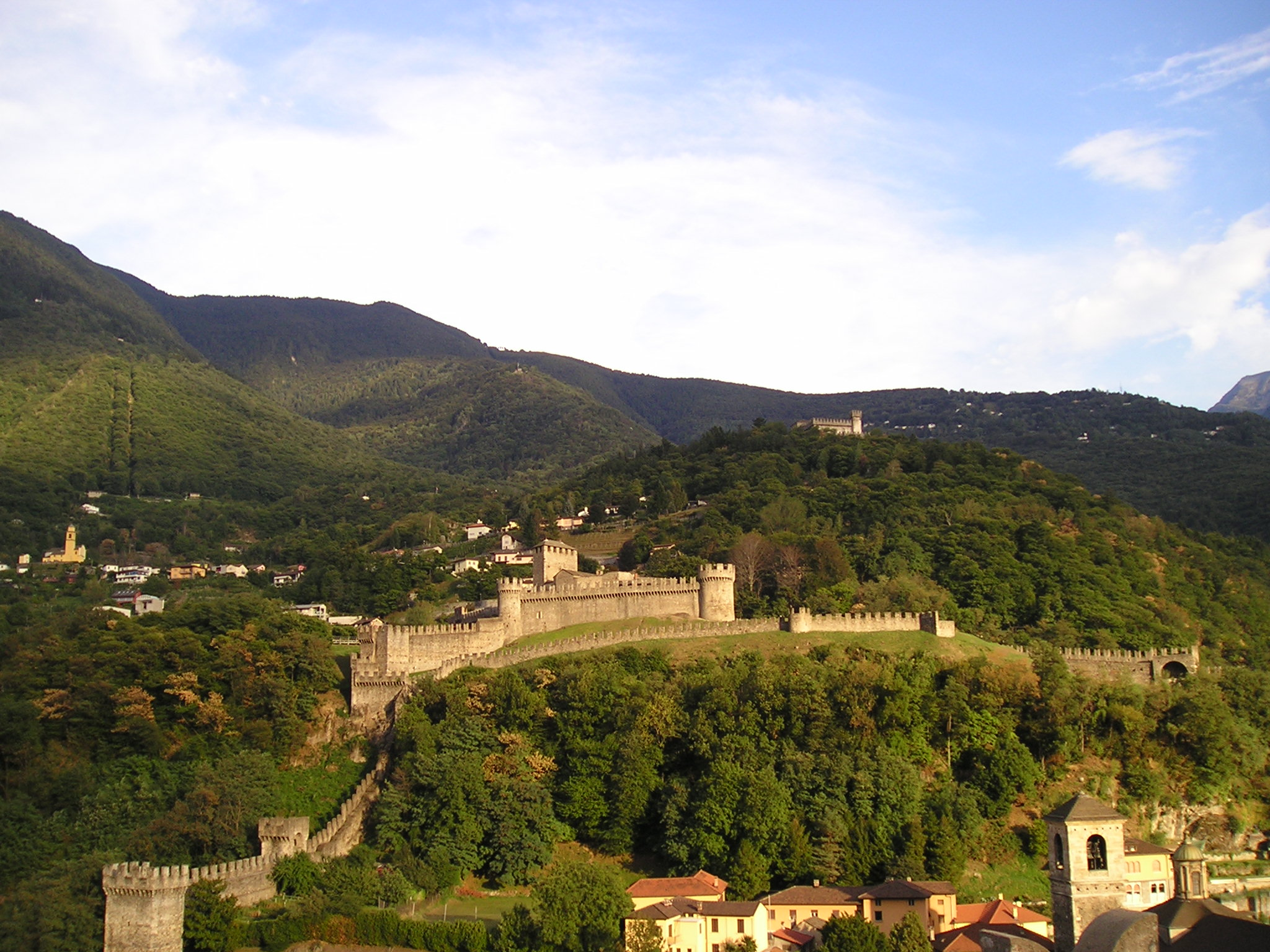
Castles of Bellinzona, Switzerland

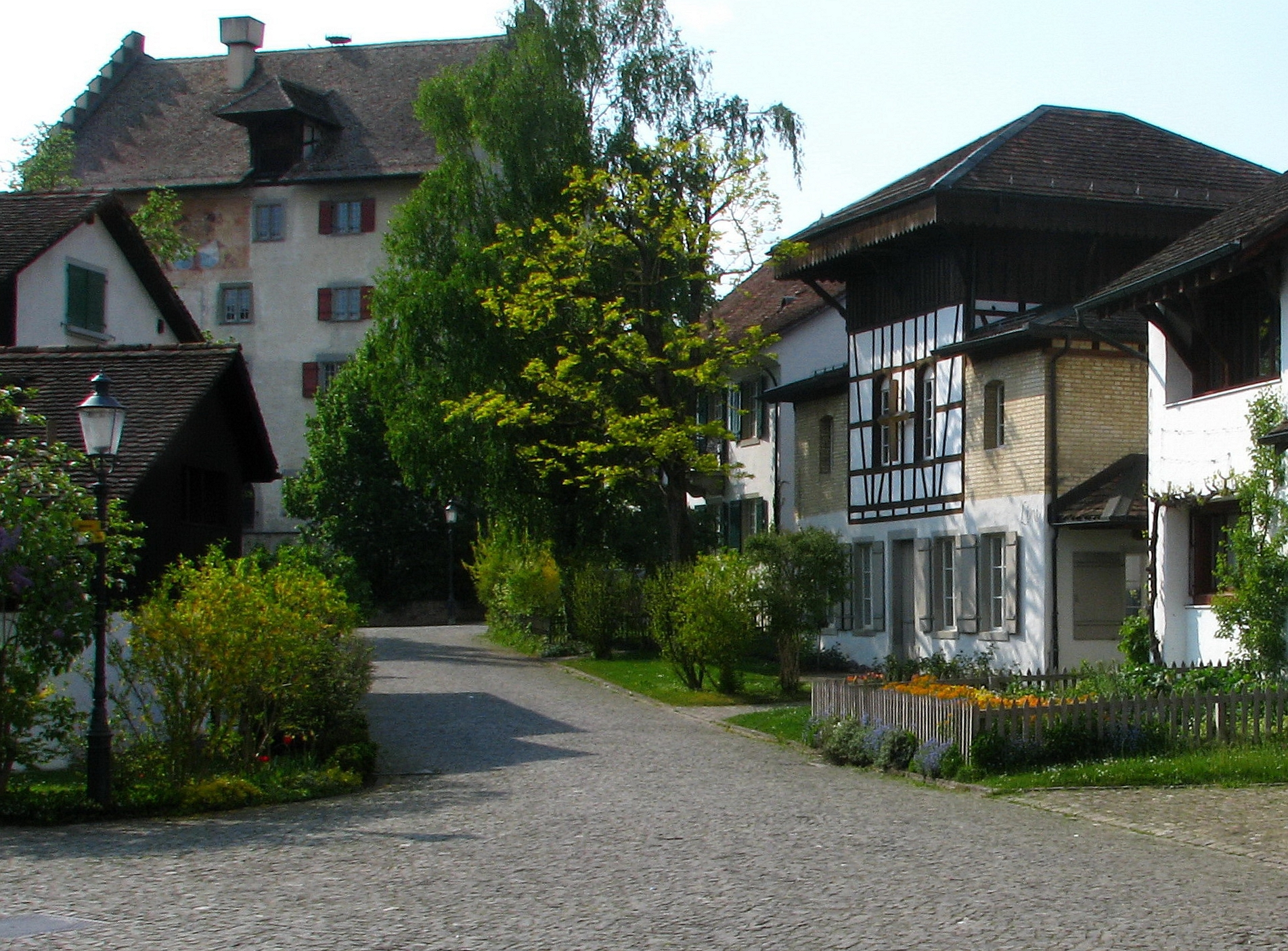
Greifensee and its castle, Switzerland, as seen from the Gallus chapel

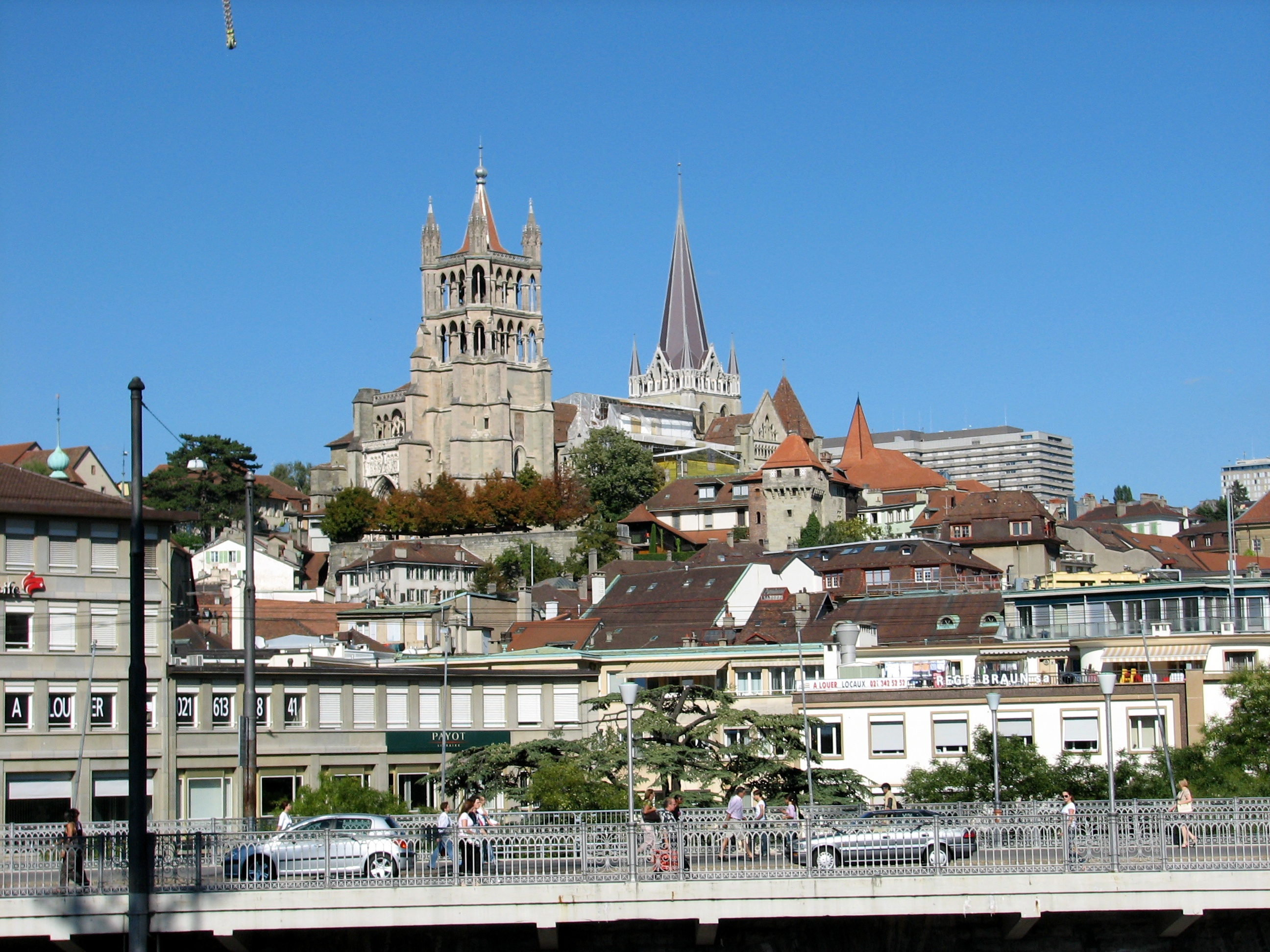
Lausanne, Switzerland and its cathedral

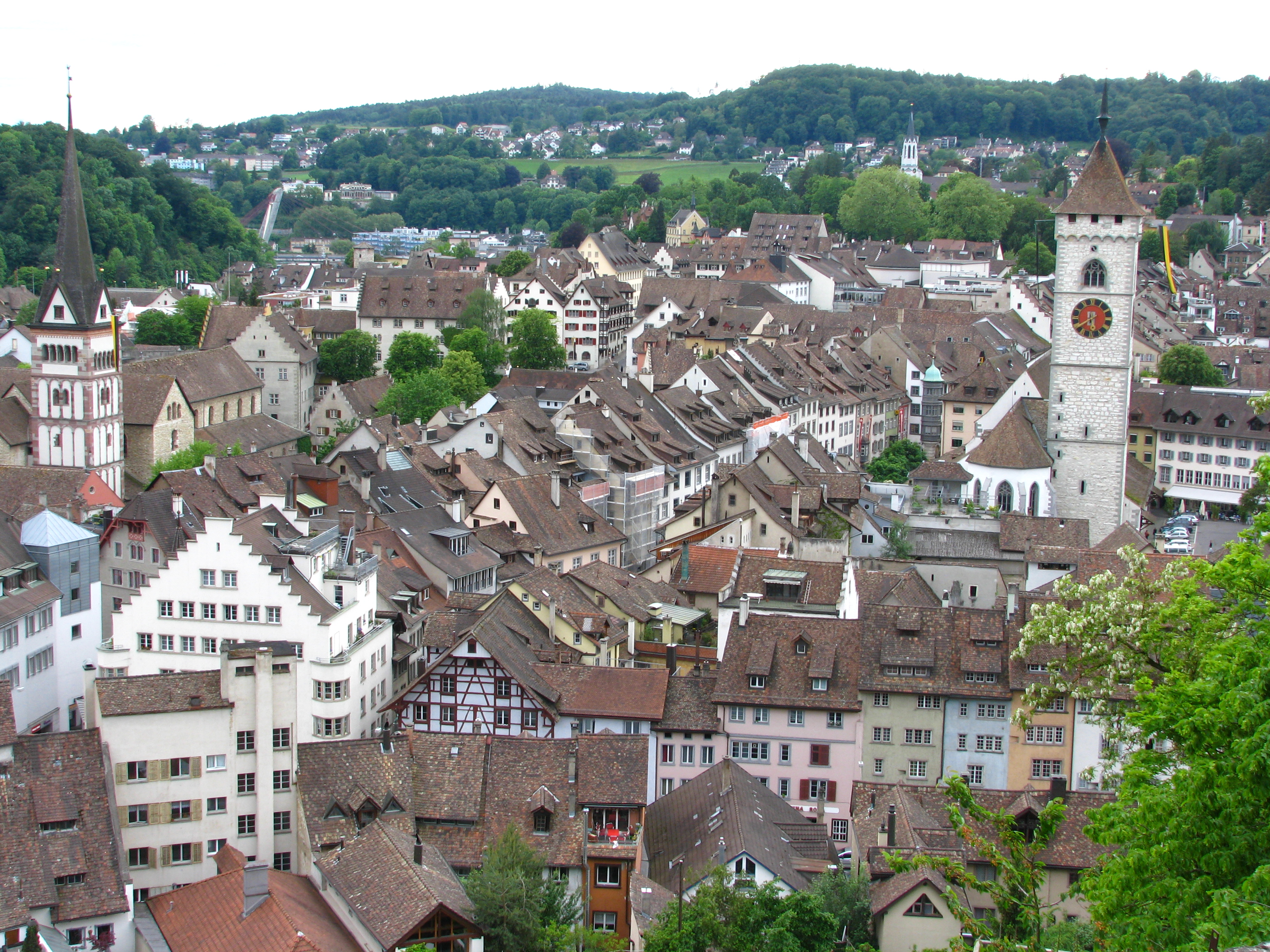
Altstadt of Schaffhausen, Switzerland, as seen from Munot

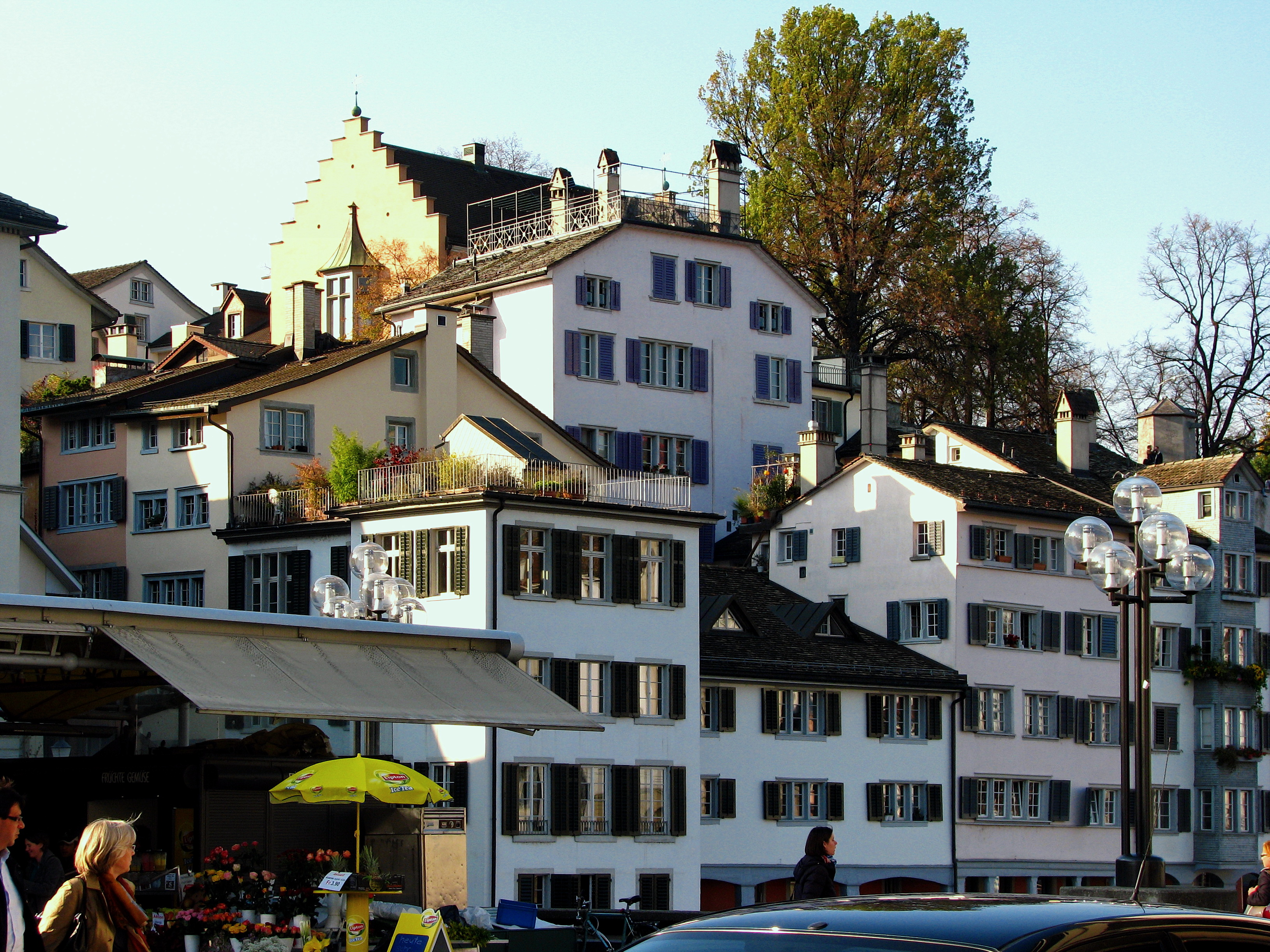
Altstadt (parts of: Schipfe) and Lindenhof hill in Zürich, Switzerland
