= Offenbach am Main =

- City
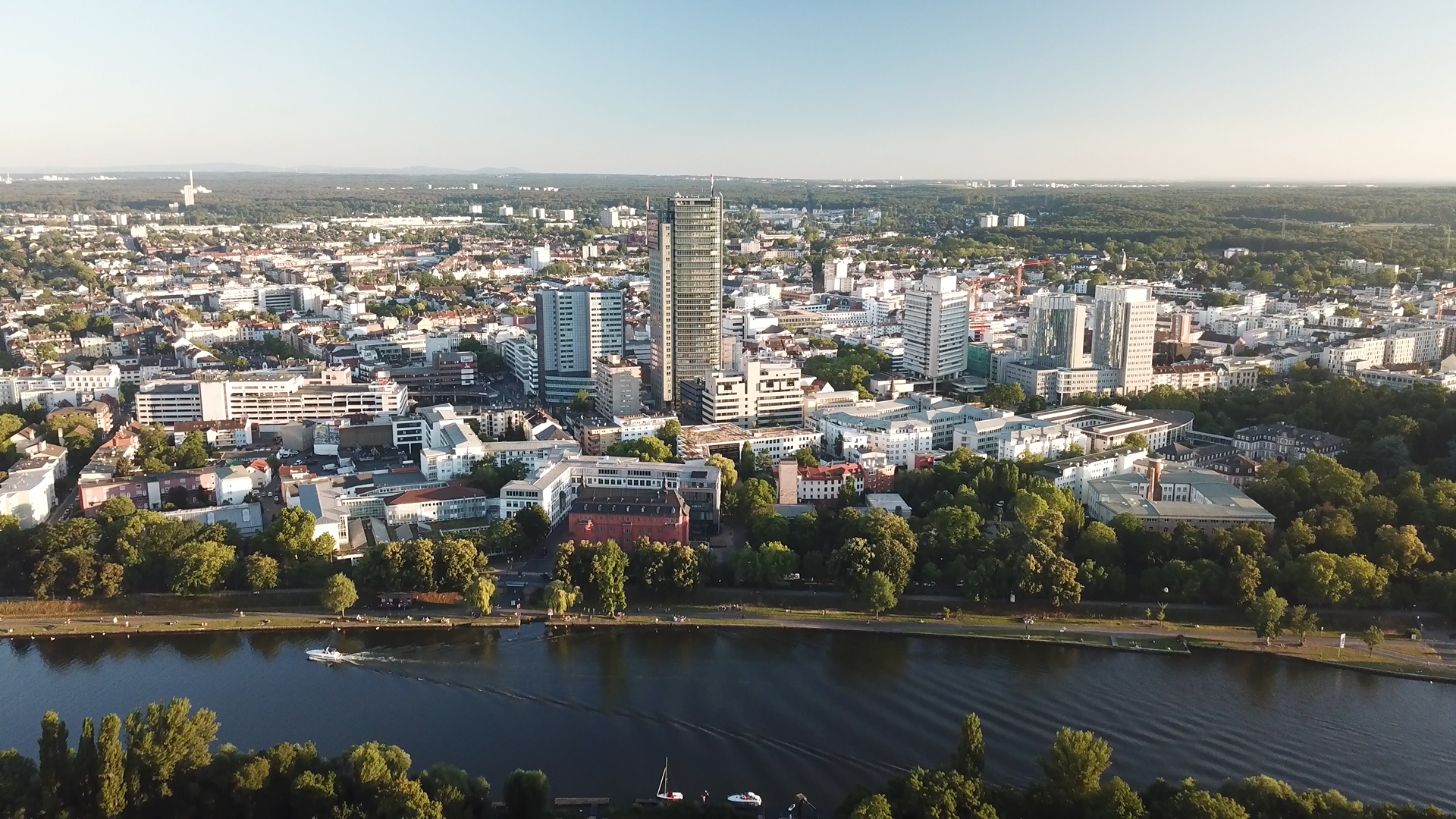
- The downtown of Offenbach

- Flag Coat of arms
- Interactive map of Offenbach am Main
- Location within Germany Location within Hesse
- Coordinates: 50°06′17″N 8°45′41″E
- Country: Germany
- State: Hesse
- Admin. region: Darmstadt
- District: Urban district

Government
  - Mayor (2023–29): Felix Schwenke (SPD)

Area
  - Total: 44.88 km^{2} (17.33 sq mi)
- Elevation: 98 m (322 ft)

Population (2025-12-31)
  - Total: 133,195
  - Density: 2,968/km^{2} (7,687/sq mi)
- Time zone: UTC+01:00 (CET)
  - Summer (DST): UTC+02:00 (CEST)
- Postal codes: 63001 - 63075
- Dialling codes: 069
- Vehicle registration: OF
- Website: www.offenbach.de

Offenbach am Main (German: [ˈɔfn̩bax ʔam ˈmaɪn], lit. 'Offenbach on the Main') is a city in Hesse, Germany, on the left bank of the river Main. It borders Frankfurt and is part of the Frankfurt urban area and the larger Frankfurt Rhein-Main urban area. It has a population of 138,335 (December 2018).

In the 20th century, the city's economy was built on machine-building, leather-making, typography and design, and the automobile and pharmaceutical industries.

== History ==
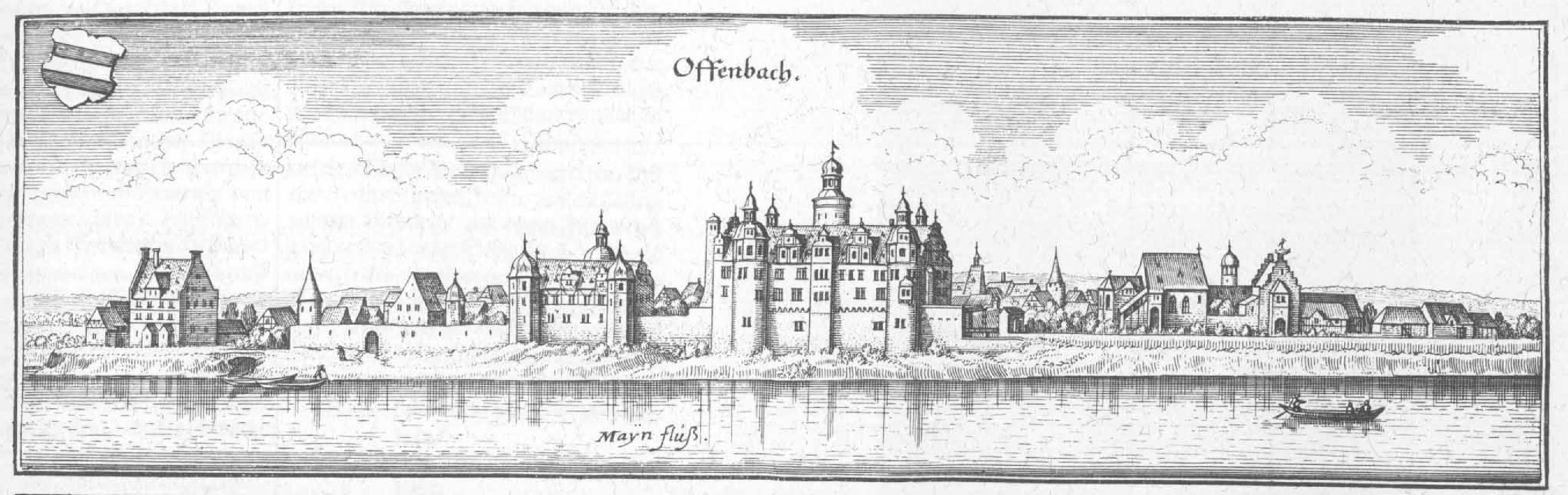
Offenbach in 1655

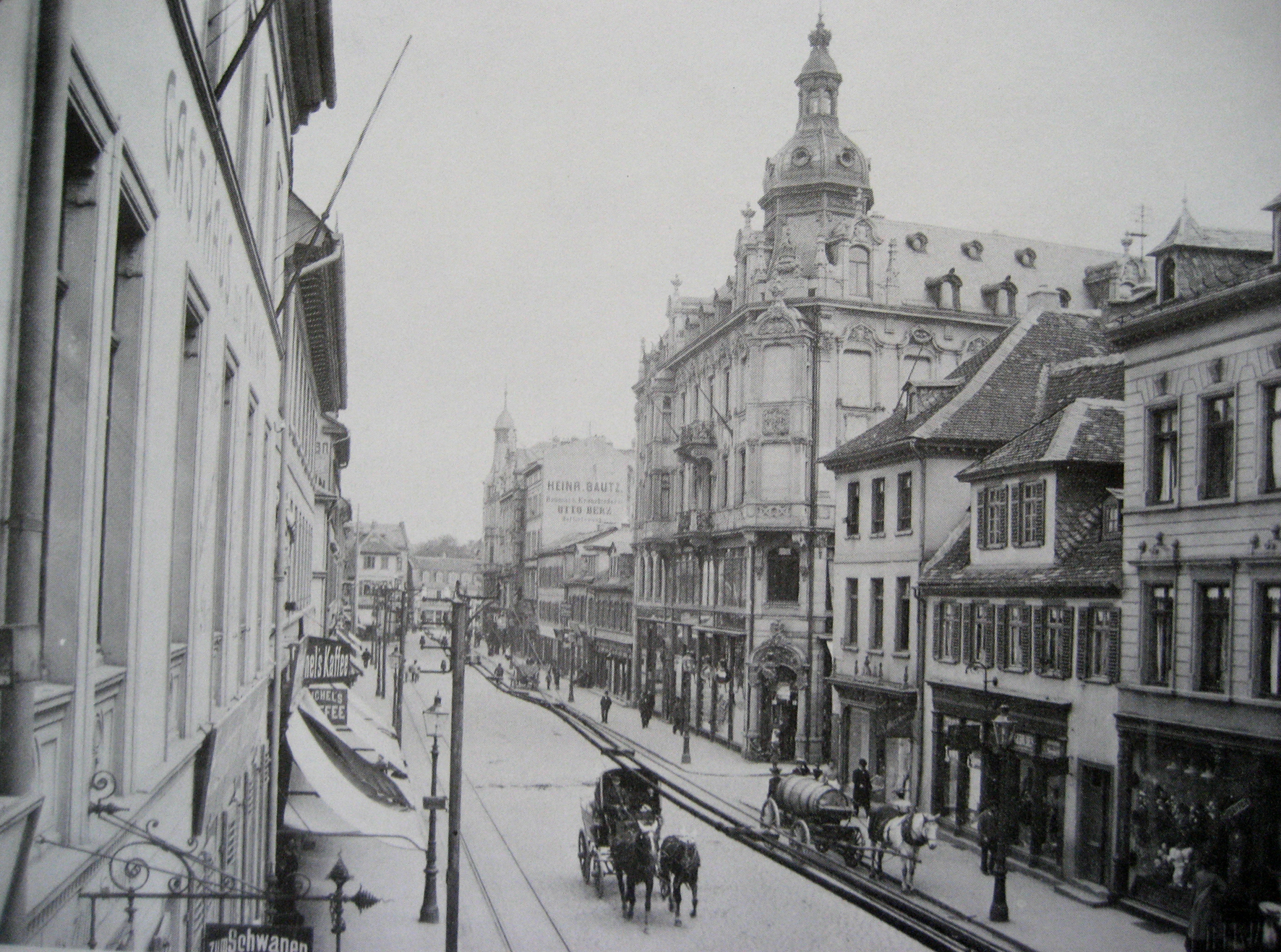
The main street Frankfurter Straße around 1900

The first documented reference to a suburb of Offenbach appears in 770. In a document of the Holy Roman Emperor Otto II dating to 977 exists the first mention of the place of Offenbach. During the Middle Ages Offenbach passed through many hands. Only in 1486 could the Count Ludwig of Isenburg finally take control of city for his family, and 1556 Count Reinhard of Isenburg relocated his Residence to Offenbach, building a palace, the Isenburger Schloß (Isenburg Palace), which was completed in 1559. It was destroyed by fire in 1564 and rebuilt in 1578.

In 1635, Offenbach was given to the Landgraves of Hesse-Darmstadt, but it was returned to the Isenburg-Birstein Count (later Prince) in 1642. It remained in that principality until 1815, when the Congress of Vienna gave the city to the Austrian Emperor, Francis I. A year later it was given to the Grand Duchy of Hesse-Darmstadt.

Always very close to the city centre of Frankfurt, Offenbach was a popular location for business. The town has its own trade fair, and many companies have opened facilities here because there are fewer restrictions and no closed businesses. French Protestants (Huguenots) came in the 17th century and settled in Offenbach and contributed to making Offenbach a prosperous city, e.g., bringing knowledge of tobacco with them and turning Offenbach into a centre for rolling cigars. The town was more cosmopolitan than Frankfurt; famous people such as Goethe and Mozart visited it several times.

The Rumpenheim Palace and its park were a popular destination for monarchs in the 19th century. The city was thereafter ruled by Grand Dukes of Hesse and by Rhine until the monarchy was abolished in 1918. Offenbach became the center of the traditional design with figures such as the architect Hugo Eberhardt, the typographer Rudolf Koch, the bookbinder and designer Ignatz Wiemeler and Ernst Engel and the painter Karl Friedrich Lippmann.

During the Second World War, a third of the city was destroyed by Allied bombing, which claimed 467 lives. With the new district Lauterborn the city was expanded to the south in the 1960s. On the border with Frankfurt, the office district Kaiserlei was built. Offenbach is a so-called "Sozialer Brennpunkt" (deprived area) because of unemployment, poverty, gang related crime and migration.

Before its eradication in the Holocaust, the city had a Jewish population. Jews settled in the city as late as the late 16th century, and it is believed that out of the 871 residents of the town as of 1829, the 40 Jewish families accounted for nearly a quarter of the town's population. They also established their own cemetery.

== Geography ==
=== Subdivision ===
The inner city area of Offenbach is quite large and consists of the historic center of the city and its expansions of the 1800s. Three formerly independent suburbs were incorporated in the first half of the 20th century: Bürgel being the first in 1908, then Bieber and Rumpenheim in 1938 and 1942.

South of the inner city area are the suburbs Lauterborn, Rosenhöhe and Tempelsee. Kaiserlei is a commercial district in the far west of the city bordering Frankfurt. In the west Waldheim is a residential neighborhood on the city limits with Mühlheim am Main. In 2010 the eastern part of the city center was officially named Mathildenviertel, as the area was already unofficially called by the locals.

Unlike most larger cities in Germany, Offenbach was not completely divided into districts. Only the nine neighborhoods mentioned above were officially districts, leaving the largest parts of the city officially unnamed. Although specific names for neighborhoods and areas were already in use among the locals and residents.

In June 2019, the city council approved a new act that subdivides the city's area entirely into 21 districts. The nine existing districts largely remained the same, most of them were even expanded. The new districts were laid out after the already by locals commonly known neighborhoods, such as the Westend, the Nordend or Buchhügel. A completely new name was only needed to be found for one neighborhood south of the city center, which never had commonly used name before: Lindenfeld. The name derived from an old name of a land lot in this area, when it was still fields in agricultural use prior to the 1800s.

As of July 2019, there are the following 21 districts:

- Bieber
- Bieberer Berg
- Buchhügel
- Buchrain
- Bürgel
- Carl-Ulrich-Siedlung
- Hafen
- Kaiserlei
- Lauterborn
- Lindenfeld
- Mathildenviertel
- Musikerviertel
- Nordend
- Offenbach-Ost
- Rosenhöhe
- Rumpenheim
- Senefelderquartier
- Tempelsee
- Waldheim
- Westend
- Zentrum

=== Climate ===
Offenbach experiences a temperate oceanic climate (Köppen climate classification Cfb). Due to its location in the Upper Rhine Plain, the whole Rhein-Main Metropolitan Region generally experiences one of the warmest climates in Germany, making it possible to grow plants such as vineyards, palm trees and olive trees.

== Governance ==
=== Mayor ===
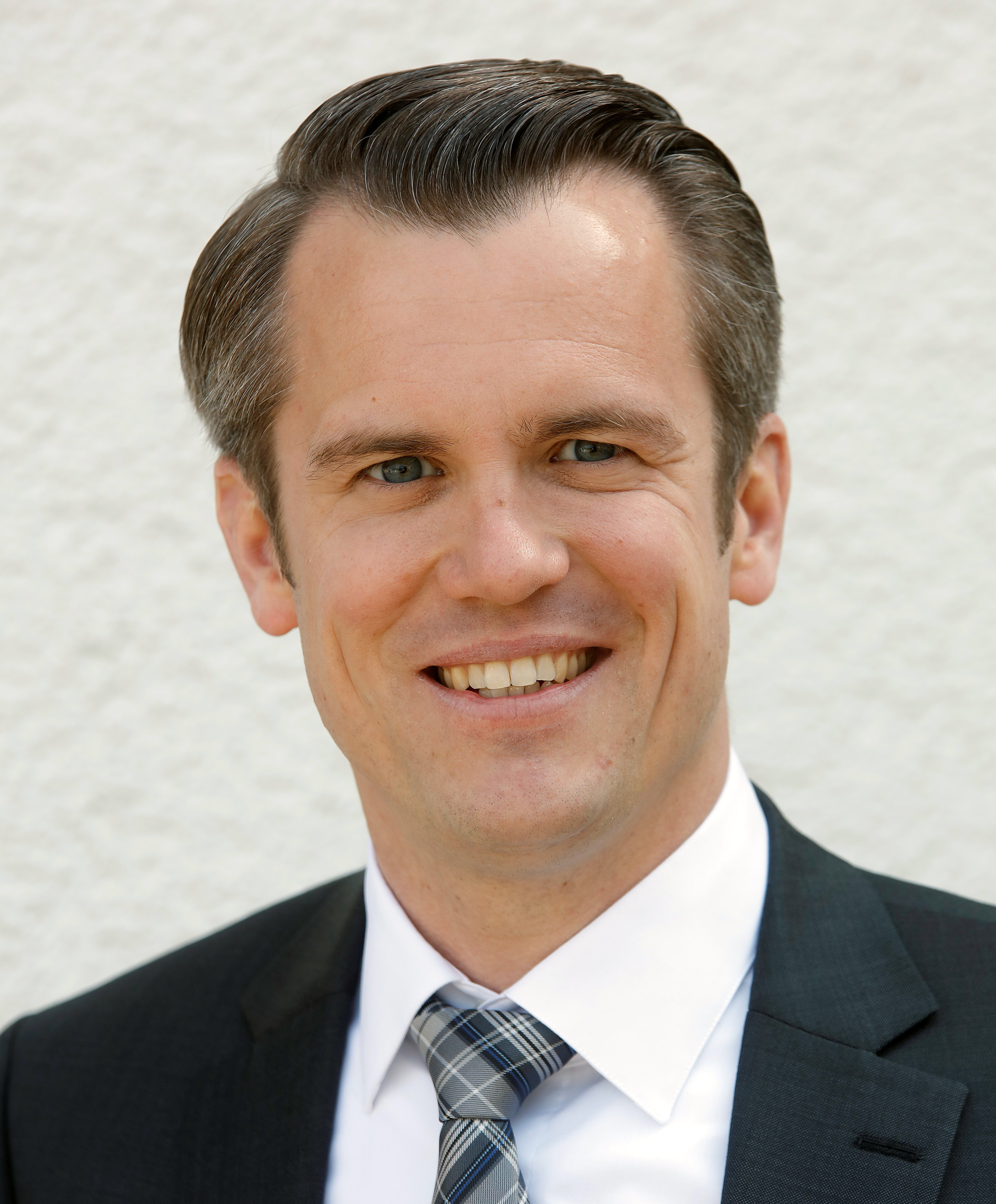
Mayor Felix Schwenke

The current mayor of Offenbach is Felix Schwenke of the Social Democratic Party (SPD). He was first elected in 2017, and was re-elected for a second term in 2023.

The following is a list of mayors since 1824:

- 1824–1826: Peter Georg d'Orville
- 1826–1834: Heinrich Philipp Schwaner
- 1834–1837: Peter Georg d'Orville
- 1837–1849: Jonas Budden
- 1849–1859: Friedrich August Schäfer
- 1859–1867: Johann Heinrich Dick
- 1867–1874: Johann Martin Hirschmann
- 1874–1882: Hermann Stölting
- 1883–1907: Wilhelm Brink
- 1907–1919: Andreas Dullo
- 1919–1933: Max Granzin
- 1947–1949: Johannes Rebholz
- 1950–1957: Hans Klüber
- 1957–1974: Georg Dietrich
- 1974–1980: Walter Buckpesch
- 1980–1986: Walter Suermann
- 1986–1994: Wolfgang Reuter
- 1994–2006: Gerhard Grandtke
- 2006–2018: Horst Schneider
- 2018–: Felix Schwenke

=== City council ===
The Offenbach city council (Stadtverordnetenversammlung) governs the city alongside the mayor. The most recent city council election was held on 15 March 2026, and the results were as follows:

Party	Lead candidate	Votes	%	+/-	Seats	+/-
Social Democratic Party (SPD)	Helena Wolf	721,116	35.0	▲6.6	25	▲5
Christian Democratic Union (CDU)	Andreas Bruszynski	384,360	18.7	▲0.6	13	±0
Alliance 90/The Greens (Grüne)	Sabrina Engelmann	268,672	13.0	▼5.1	9	▼4
The Left (Die Linke)	Gizem Erinç-Çiftçi	248,143	12.1	▲3.5	9	▲3
Free Democratic Party (FDP)	Anja Schwalbach	114,398	5.6	▼0.7	4	±0
Free Voters (FW)	Dennis Lehmann	70,979	3.4	▼0.8	3	±0
Alternative for Germany (AfD)	Olaf Schwaier	69,843	3.4	▼3.9	2	▼3
Human Environment Animal Protection Party (Tierschutzpartei)	Miriam Schönauer	45,830	2.2	New	2	New
Sahra Wagenknecht Alliance (BSW)	Jassin Khatem	39,484	1.9	New	1	New
Alliance for Innovation and Justice (BIG)	Burhan Denizli	38,421	1.9	▲0.6	1	±0
Offenbach für alle (Ofa)	Annette Schaper-Herget	36,753	1.8	New	1	New
Volt Germany (Volt)	Christian Bello	20,984	1.0	New	1	New
Valid votes		32,939	95.9			
Invalid votes		1,409	4.1			
Total		34,348	100.0		71	±0
Electorate/voter turnout		94,312	36.4	▲0.8		
Sources: Votemanager; City of Offenbach final result notice

== Twin towns – sister cities ==
Offenbach am Main is twinned with:

- Puteaux, France (1955)
- Esch-sur-Alzette, Luxembourg (1956)
- Mödling, Austria (1956)
- Saint-Gilles, Belgium (1956)
- Tower Hamlets, England, United Kingdom (1956)
- Zemun (Belgrade), Serbia (1956)
- Velletri, Italy (1957)
- Rivas, Nicaragua (1986)
- Kawagoe, Japan (1983)
- Oryol, Russia (1988)
- Yangzhou, China (1997)

== Demographics ==
Offenbach has a large non-German population. In 2016, foreign nationals made up 37% of the population. The largest communities are, in that order, from Turkey, Greece, Romania, Poland and Italy.

As of 2019, residents with a migration background enumerated 88,608, or 63.4% of the population, while Germans without a migration background enumerated 51,241 residents. Only one-in-three, 29.5%, of foreign residents originated from Europe, particularly from countries like Romania, Greece, Bulgaria, Poland, Croatia and Italy.

According to census data, Offenbach and Duisburg had the highest share of Muslim migrants of all German districts in 2011. Muslims were between 14% and 17% of the city's population as of 2011. Turks made up 11% of the city's population in 2019.

== Population history ==
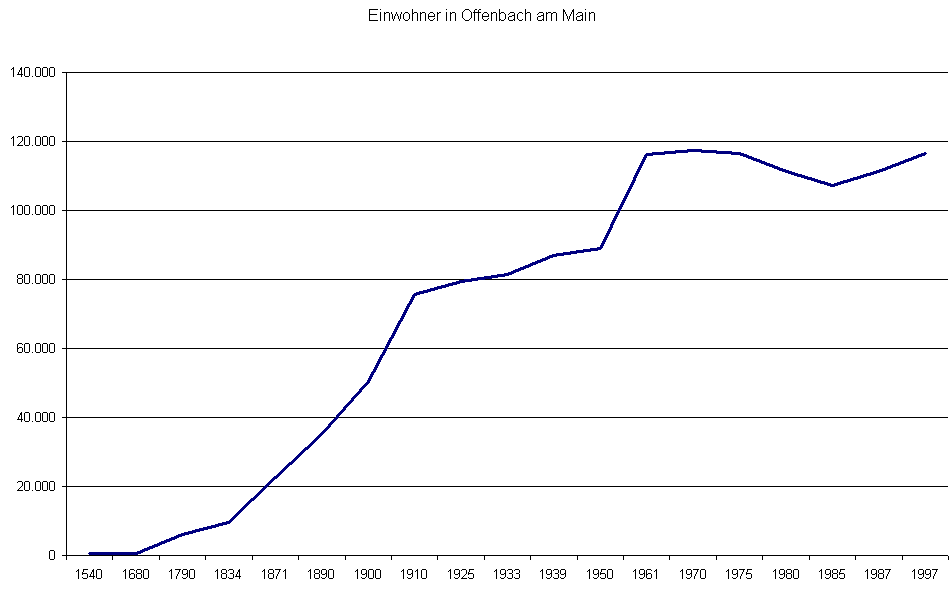
The development of the population in Offenbach between 1540 and 1997

Until the end of the 17th century, Offenbach remained a small town with less than a thousand inhabitants. With the coming into power of the count Johann Philipp in 1685, the city began to develop and the population rose steadily. In the 19th century the city became industrialized and the population increased even tenfold. Offenbach is one of the German cities where Germans without migrant background make up a minority of the population. As of 31 December 2012, approx. 44.3% of residents or 55,047 people had no foreign background. In contrast to that, there were 55.7% or 69,214 people with at least one non-German grandparent. The largest of those groups are:

Largest groups of foreign residents by 2022
Country	Population
Turkey	6,179
Romania	5,631
Syria	5,416
Greece	5,180
Bulgaria	4,984
Poland	4,112
Croatia	4,052
Italy	3,919
Ukraine	3,469
Serbia	3,127
Afghanistan	2,715
Bosnia and Herzegovina	2,380
Iraq	1,807
Morocco	1,386
Spain	1,234

Year	Population
1540	480
1685	600
1718	1,500
1800	5,000
1816	6,210
1825	7,147
1828	7,466
1830	7,498
1 December 1834	9,433
1 December 1840	9,597
3 December 1843	9,883
3 December 1846	11,565
3 December 1852	11,087
3 December 1855	13,724
3 December 1861	16,708
3 December 1864	19,390

Year	Population
3 December 1867	20,322
1 December 1871	22,689
1 December 1875	26,012
1 December 1880	28,597
1 December 1885	31,704
1 December 1890	35,064
2 December 1895	39,388
1 December 1900	50,468
1 December 1905	59,765
1 December 1910	75,583
1 December 1916	67,197
5 December 1917	67,483
8 October 1919	75,380
16 June 1925	79,362
16 June 1933	81,329
17 May 1939	85,140

Year	Population
31 December 1945	70,600
29 October 1946	75,479
13 September 1950	89,030
25 September 1956	104,283
6 June 1961	116,195
31 December 1965	117,893
27 May 1970	117,306
31 December 1975	115,251
31 December 1980	110,993
31 December 1985	107,090
25 May 1987	111,386
31 December 1990	114,992
31 December 1995	116,533
31 December 2000	117,535
30 September 2005	119,833
31 March 2007	117,224

Year	Population
31 December 2008	118,103
31 December 2009	117,718
31 December 2010	119,734
31 December 2011	121,970
31 December 2012	116,945
31 December 2013	126,934
31 December 2014	129,974
31 December 2015	132,068
31 December 2016	133,827
31 December 2017	135,692
31 December 2018	137,477
31 December 2019	139,849
31 December 2020	140,496
31 December 2021	140,857
31 December 2022	143,578
31 December 2023	144,962
31 December 2024	145,666

== Economy ==
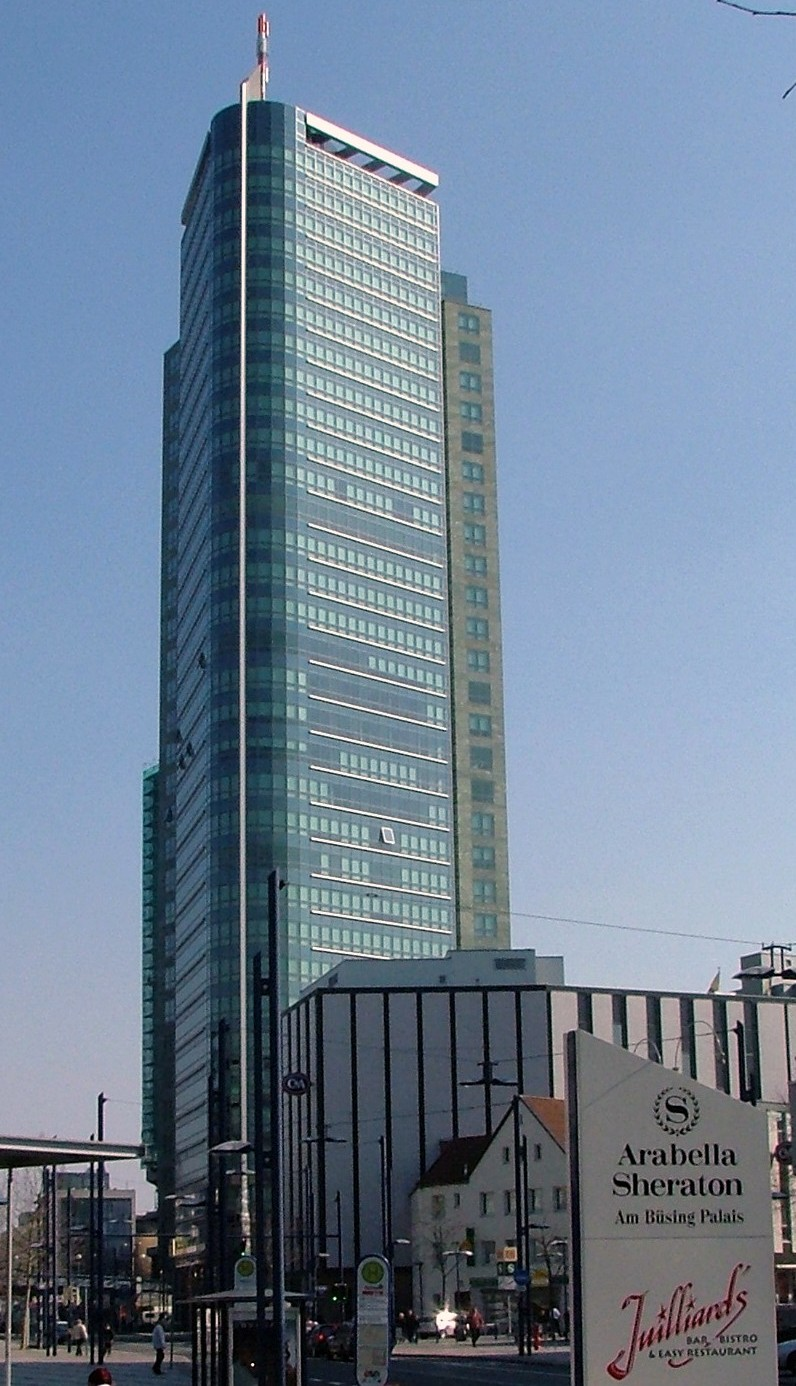
The 120-meter high "City-Tower" is mainly used as the German headquarters of Capgemini.

Until the early 1970s, Offenbach was dominated by the machine-building and leather industries. The city hosts the German Association for Electrical, Electronic and Information Technologies to this day. The Deutscher Wetterdienst, commonly abbreviated as DWD, (translated from German as German Meteorological Service), residing in the Westend district.

Offenbach was also the European center of typography, with Gebr. Klingspor and Linotype (inventors of Optima or Palatino typeface) moving to nearby Eschborn in the 1970s and MAN Roland printing machines still a major employer today. Typography and design still remain important with a cluster of graphic design and industrial design companies, as well as the university level Hochschule für Gestaltung Offenbach am Main (HfG) design school and the Klingspor Museum.

In recent years Offenbach has become a popular location for a wide array of services, especially from the transport sectors. Offenbach is the host to the European headquarters of Honda, Hyundai Motors and Kumho Tires.

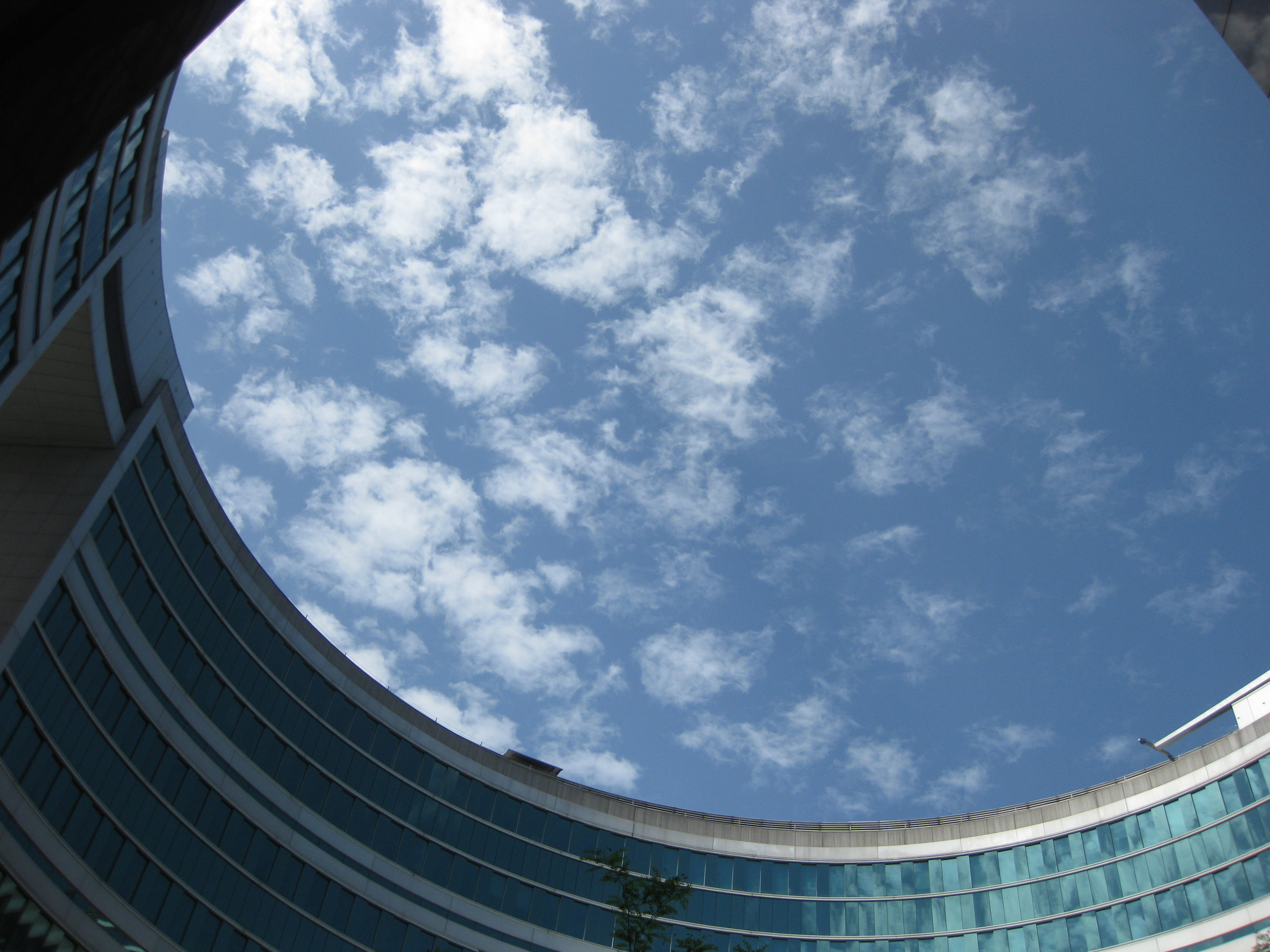
An office building in Offenbach-Kaiserlei

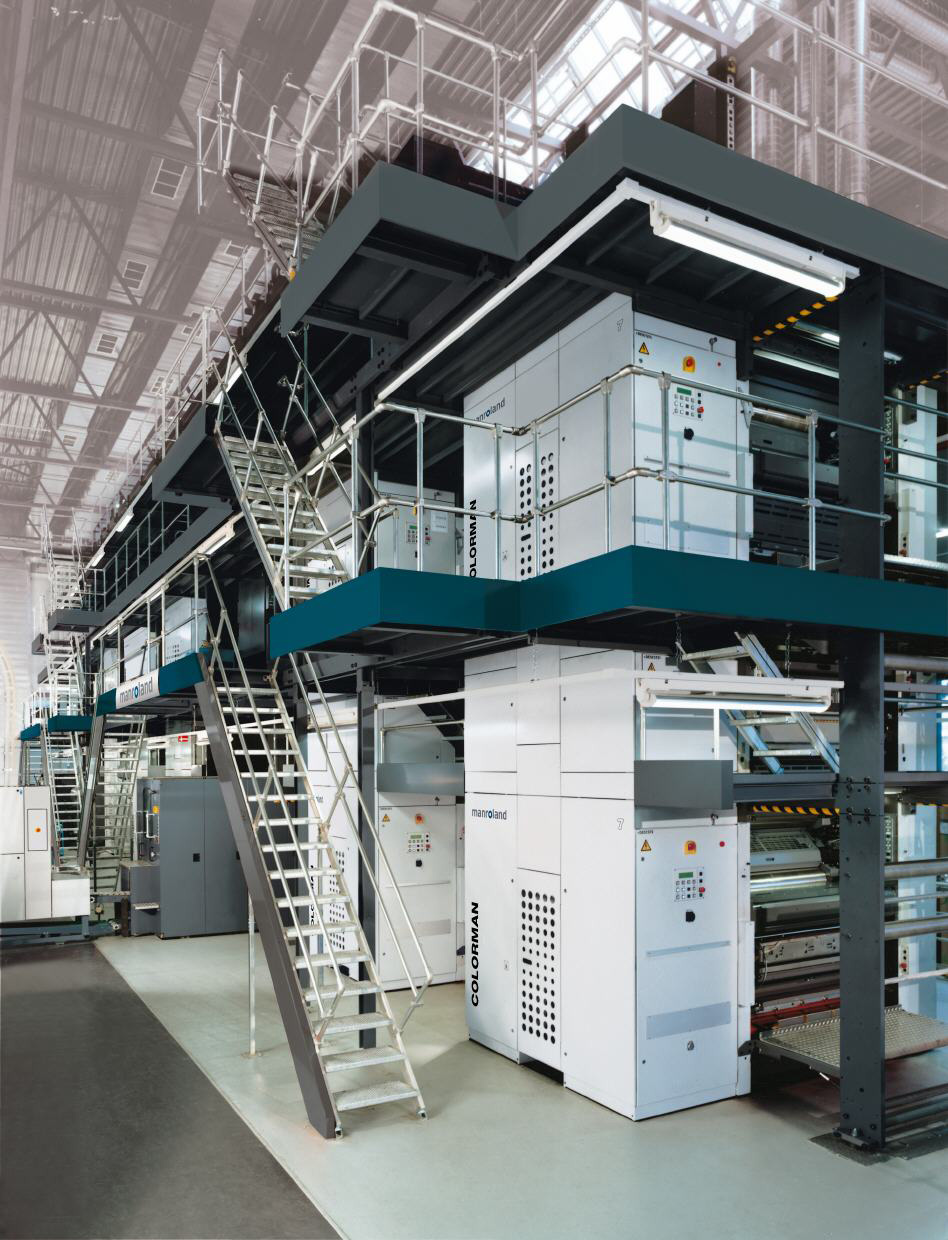
A printing machine produced by Manroland

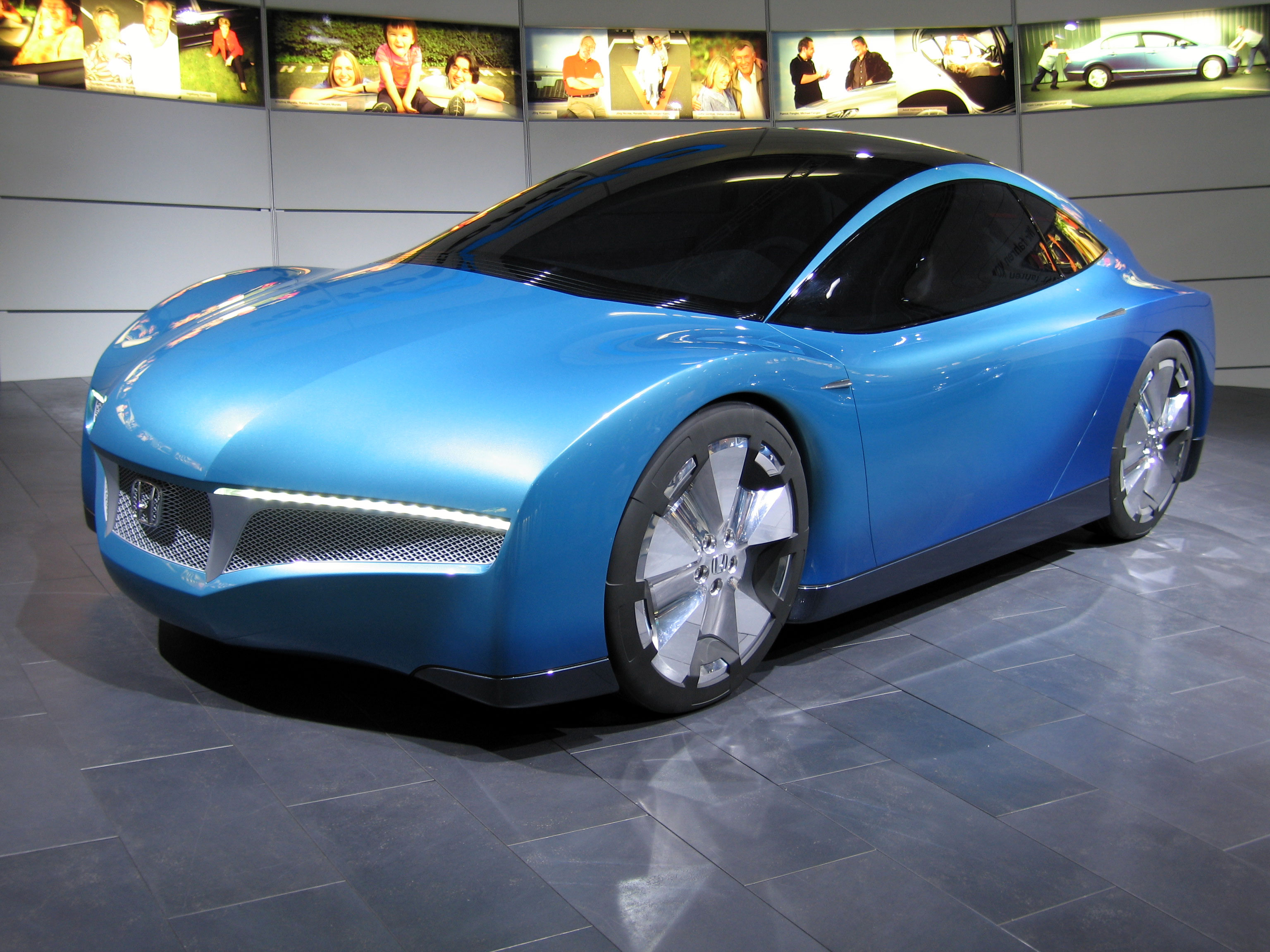
Honda Small Hybrid Sports Concept developed in Offenbach

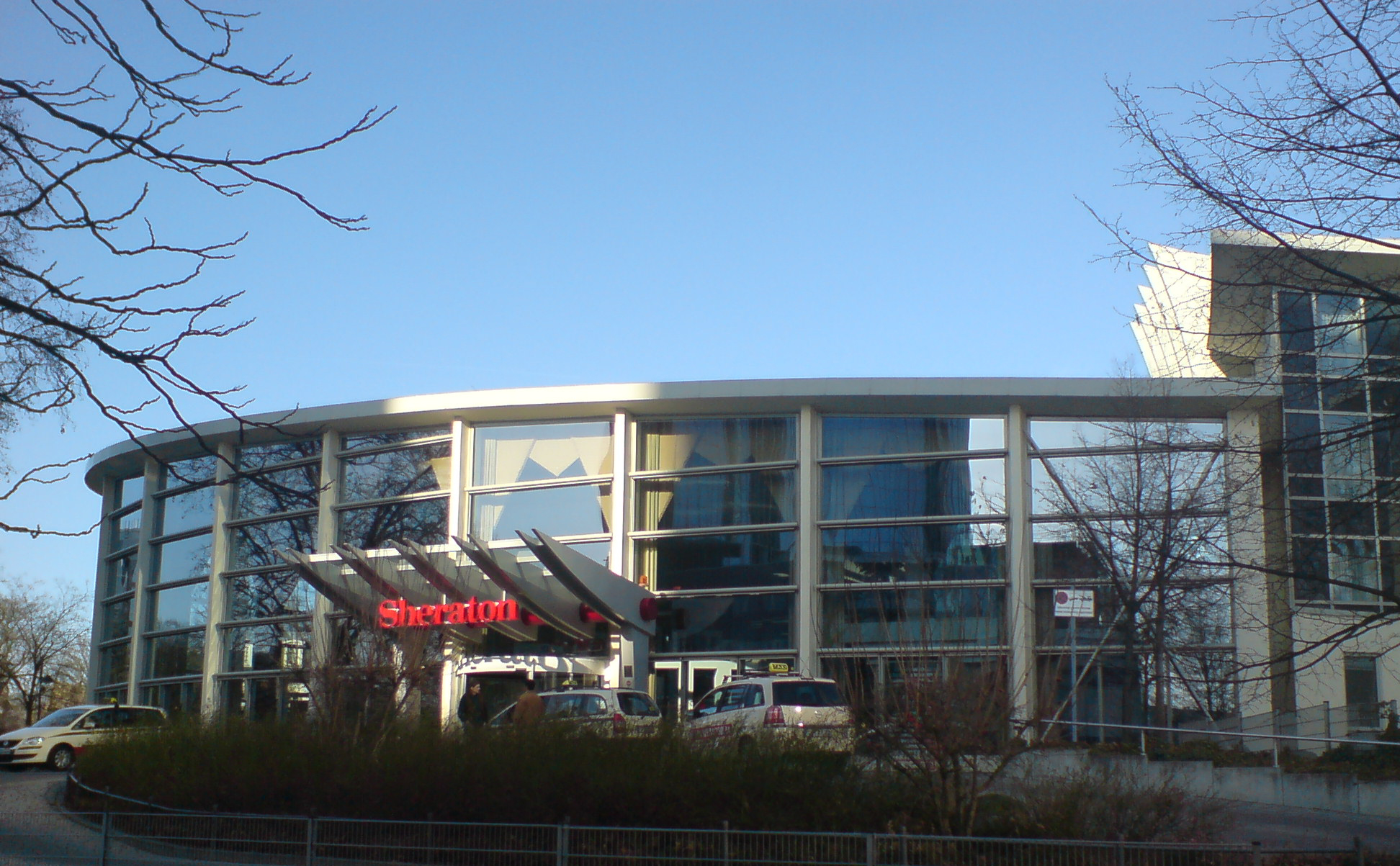
The Sheraton Offenbach

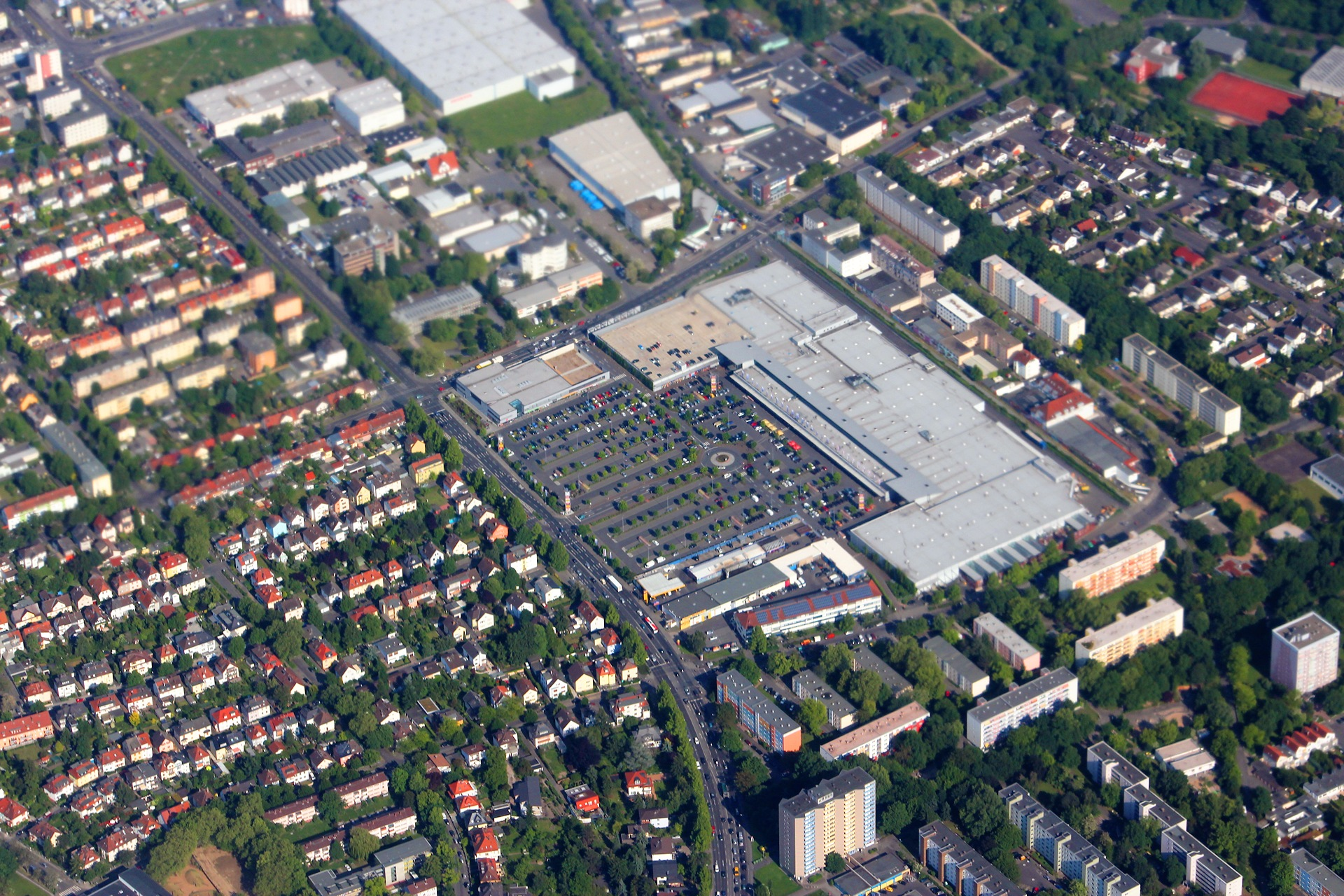
Einkaufszentrum Ring Center

== Arts and culture ==
=== Attractions ===
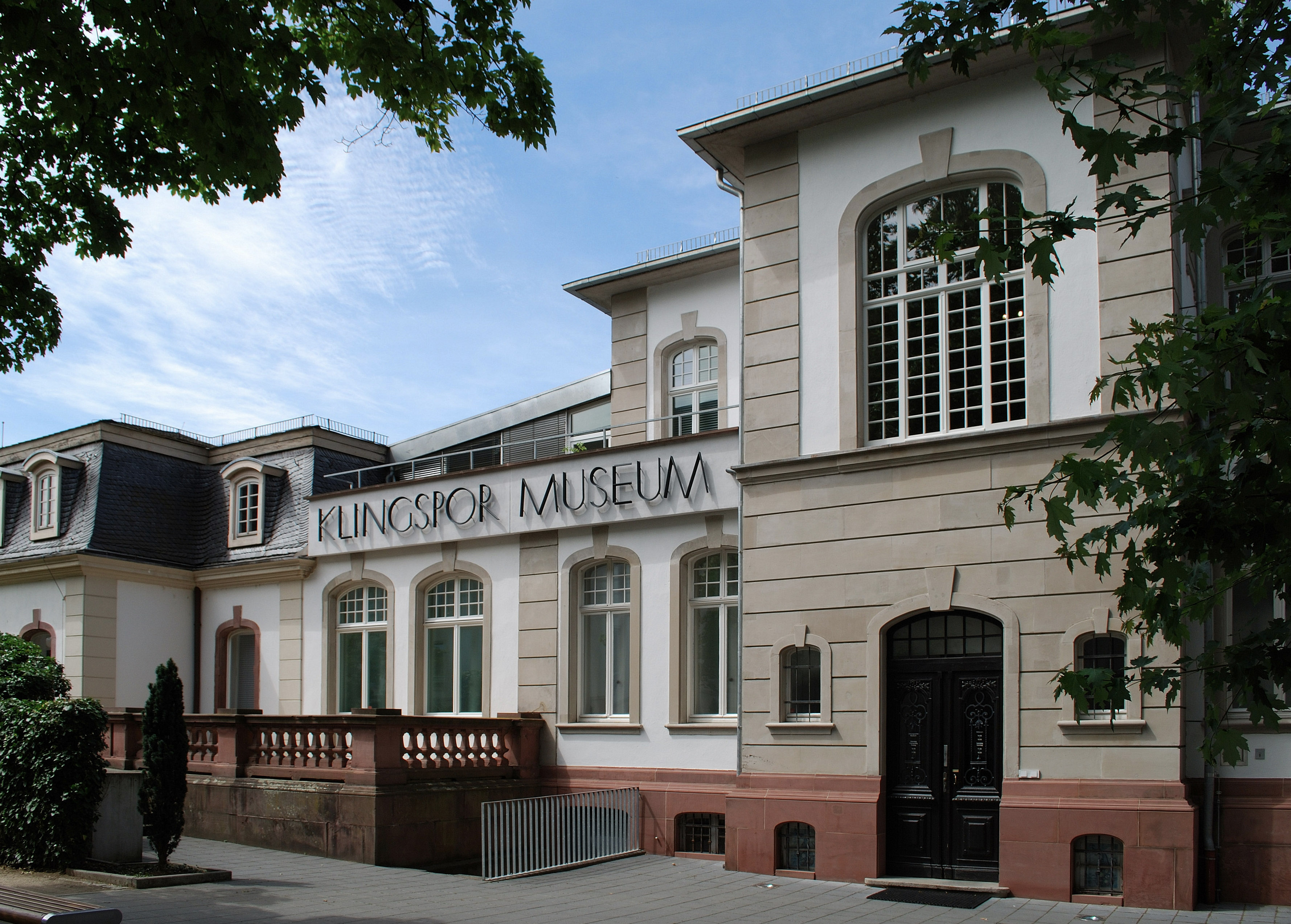
Klingspor Museum

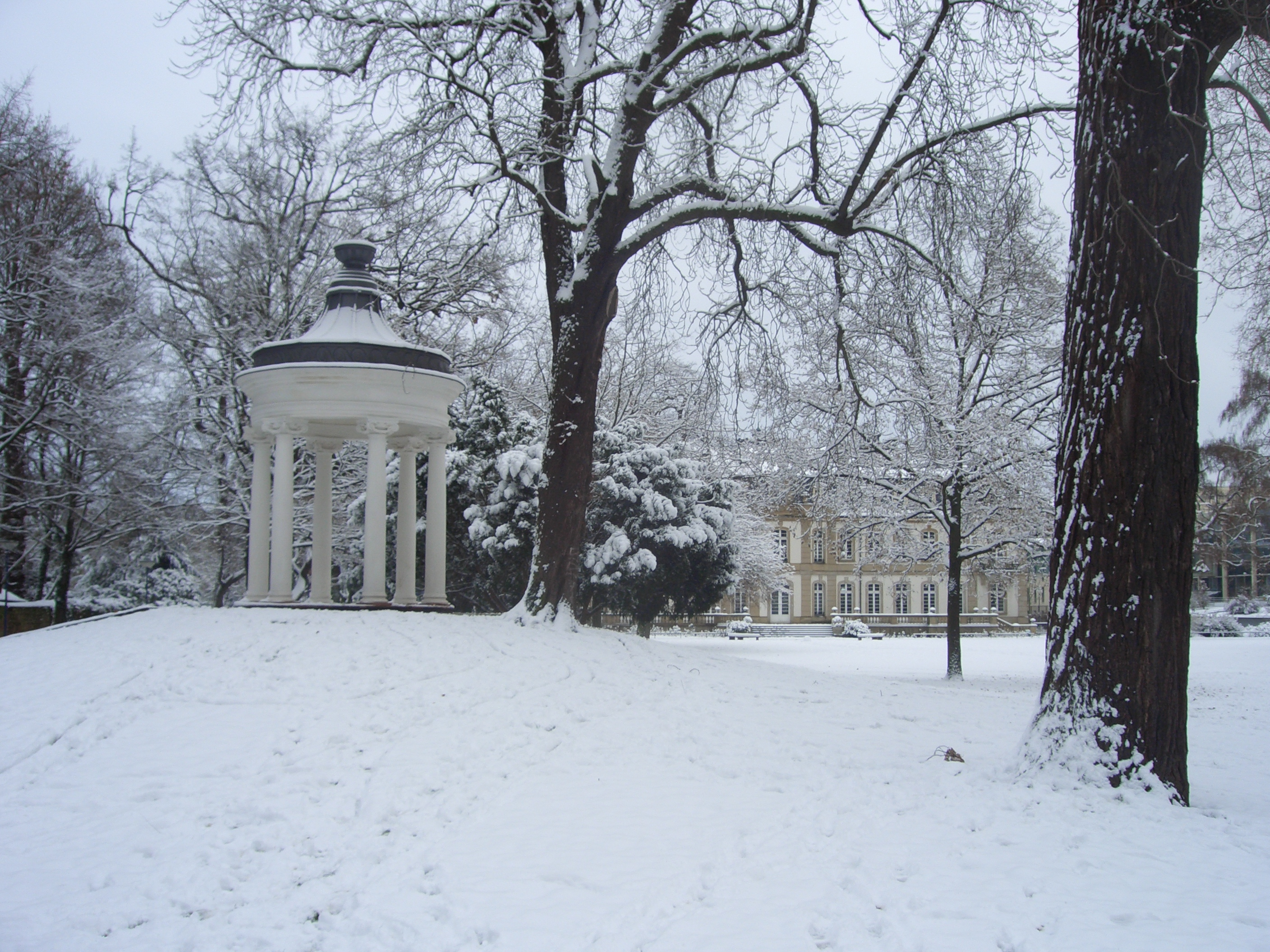
The Büsing-Park in winter

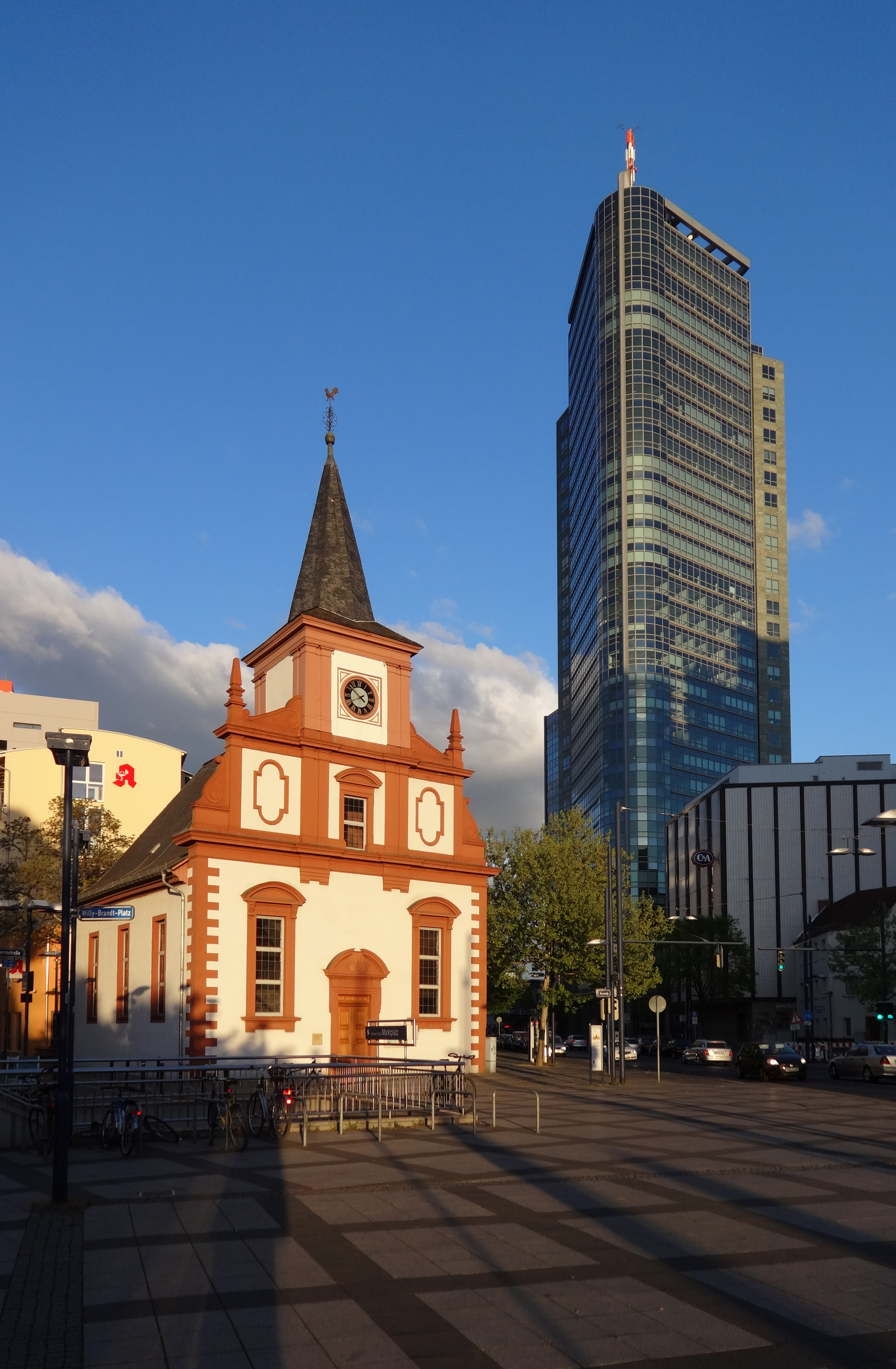
French Protestant church and City Tower

In Offenbach there is no specific Old Town, but there are several buildings which survived bombing during the war and have been restored. One of them is the Neo-baroque palace Büsingpalais with the Büsingpark, reconstructed in the 1980s. Today it is used as a congress center close to the Sheraton hotel. Between the shopping area and the Main, is the Lilipark and the Lilitemple, named after Johann Wolfgang von Goethe's fiancée Lili Schönemann. The most important building is the Isenburger Schloss (Isenburg Palace), a renaissance palace from 1576. It is today used by the Offenbach Design University which is next to it. There is also a neoclassic palace in the borough Rumpenheim, the Rumpenheimer Schloss it now serves exclusively as domestic dwellings but the park is public.

- Isenburger Schloss, a Renaissance building, now used by the Offenbach Design University
- Büsingpalais with Büsingpark
- Wilhelmsplatz a square with coffee houses and three times a week a market.
- Buildings of the French Protestant Church and the French Protestant Community.
- Rumpenheim Palace.
- Former Synagogue "Capitol" (now a concert hall next to the new Synagogue).
- The Westend Quarter (19th century).
- Several art deco apartment houses.
- Buildings by early 20th century architect Hugo Eberhardt: "Heyne" Factory, main building of the Design University, AOK Insurance building.
- Prefabricated houses by Egon Eiermann in Lauterborn

=== Events ===
There are several festivals in Offenbach, some of these are:

- Lichterfest im Büsing-Park (festival of lights in the park of the Büsing palais)
- Nacht der Museen (with Frankfurt)
- Mainuferfest
- Cross Media Night

=== Museums ===
- German Leather Museum
- Klingspor Museum, museum of typography and calligraphy
- Haus der Stadtgeschichte, municipal historical museum
- Rosenheim-Museum for the painter Bernd Rosenheim

== Sports ==
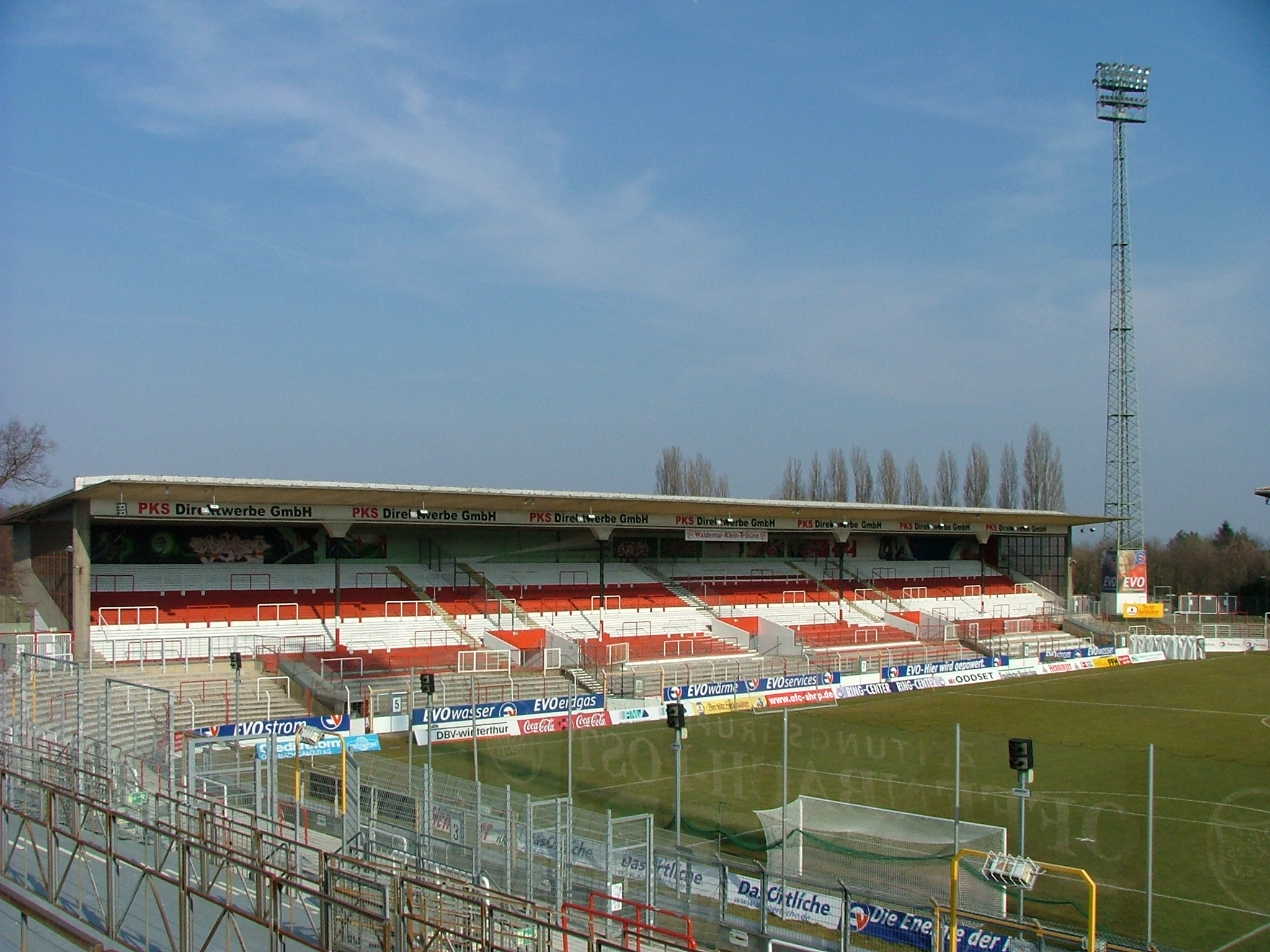
Home to the football club Kickers Offenbach stadium "Bieberer Berg"

Kickers Offenbach football club was founded in 1901.

== Transport ==
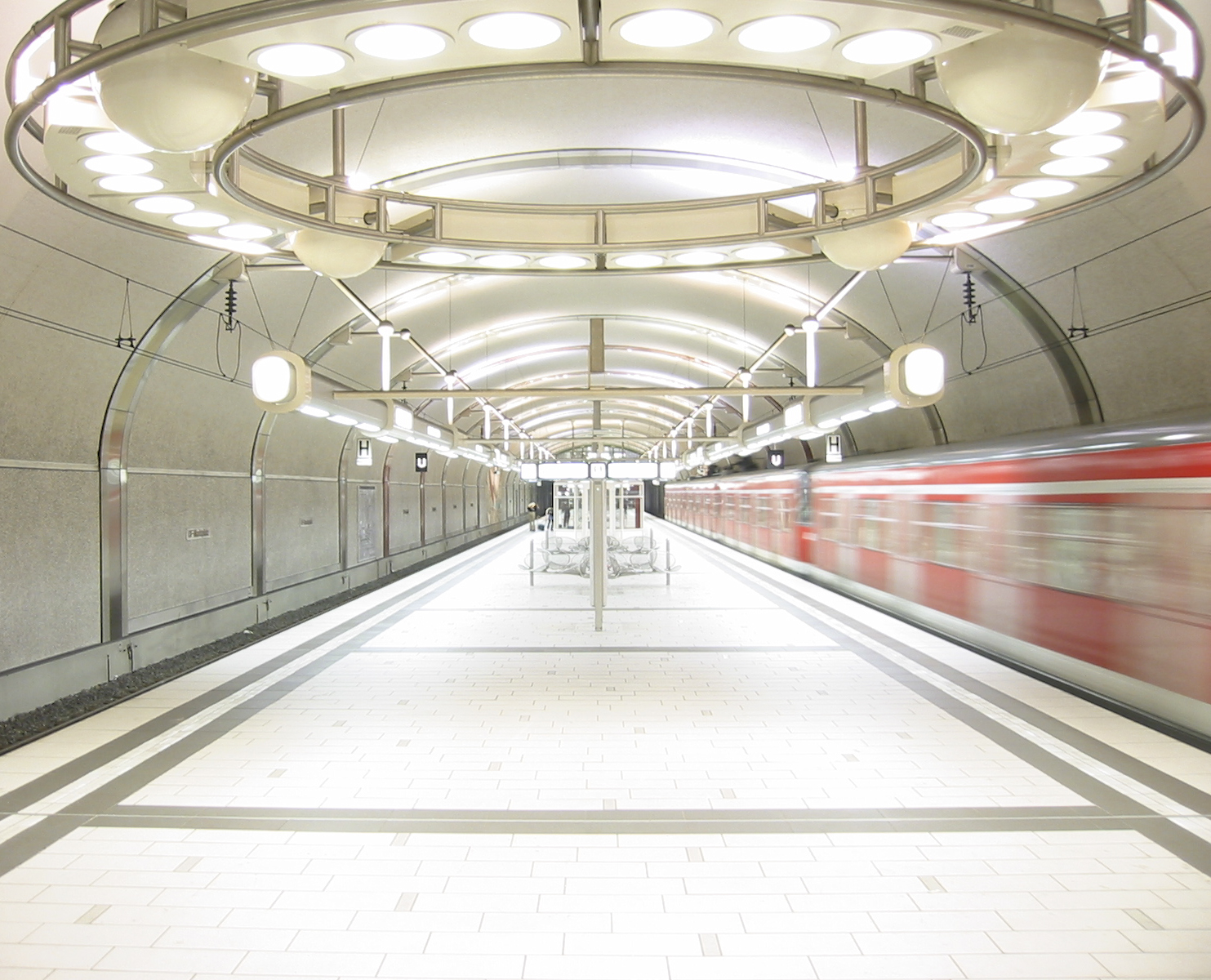
S-Bahn station: Marktplatz

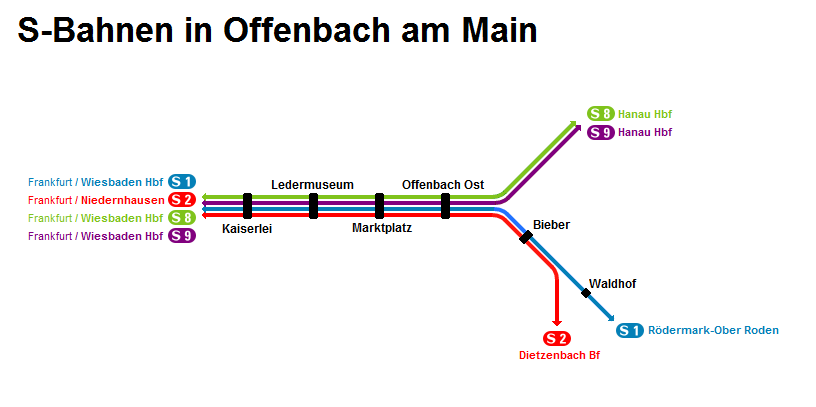
S-Bahn network in Offenbach

Rhein-Main-Verkehrsverbund (RMV)

=== Roads ===
The streets of central Offenbach are usually congested with cars during the rush hour. Some areas, especially around the shopping streets, are pedestrian-only streets. There are numerous car parks located throughout the city. The Offenbacher Kreuz is an Autobahn interchange where the Autobahnen A 3 (Cologne-Würzburg) and A 661 meet. The A661 crosses the A 3 (Cologne-Würzburg) and A 5 (Basel-Hannover).

=== Public transport ===
The city is connected by a major line of the S-Bahn railway system to Frankfurt. The station in the city center is Marktplatz. In general, six stations are located in Offenbach: Offenbach-Kaiserlei, Offenbach-Ledermuseum, Offenbach-Marktplatz, Offenbach-Ost, Offenbach-Bieber, Offenbach-Waldhof. Trains run every 5–10 minutes between Offenbach and Frankfurt. A 24 hours Service between both cities was introduced in 2013. The journey from Offenbach Marktplatz to Frankfurt Main Station takes 15 minutes, Frankfurt Airport can be reached within 26 minutes. Suburban trains run underground in downtown Offenbach. The city tunnel was opened in 1996. Services split up at Offenbach-Ost Station to Hanau (S8 and S9 trains), Rödermark (S1) and Dietzenbach (S2). An often-addressed problem is that there is no direct interchange between regional and suburban trains in Offenbach, since the lines were separated when the tunnel was built. Therefore, residents and city officials have proposed several times that platforms for regional trains should be added to the Offenbach-Ost Station.

The city's municipal public transportation services are operated by the "Offenbacher Verkehrsbetriebe" (OVB) and its subcontractors. Nine routes (numbered 101–108 and 120) connect all boroughs with the major train stations at Marktplatz, Offenbach-Ost and Kaiserlei as well as the Central Station. The bus network has very good coverage and frequency of service. All routes except for number 102 and number 107 busses stop at Marktplatz station, making it the most important transit hub in the city. Buses usually run with a 15-minute headway on working days and a 30-minute headway on Sundays, public holidays and after 8:00 pm. Exemptions are routes 103, 107 and 120 which run every 30 minutes. Number 103 and 120 buses share most of their route, creating a 15-minute headway on the shared section in downtown Offenbach. Those two routes also connect the city of Offenbach with its surrounding towns, Frankfurt am Main, Mühlheim am Main and Obertshausen. Out of all municipal bus services the number 101 bus is the most frequented route. It runs every 7 or 8 minutes Mondays through Fridays. Service on the other most frequented routes (104 and 105) is also increased to a 7/8-minute headway during rush hours. In addition to the municipal bus services there are regional buses that serve the city. Two express bus routes connect Offenbach to the city of Langen (route X83) and Bad Vilbel (X97). Other services are the number OF-30 bus to Heusenstamm, the 41 bus to Fechenheim as well as the 551 to Gravenbruch, Enkheim and Bad Vilbel.

Regional trains stop at the Offenbach Central Station in the city's center. The station is on the Frankfurt-Hanau main line which is one of railway with the most traffic in Germany. Mostly hourly service for Wächsersbach, Fulda, Würzburg and Erbach call at the Offenbach Central Station. There is no long-distance train service at central station, although many high-speed trains pass through on their way from Frankfurt to Munich, Berlin or Hamburg. The station lost most of its importance when the suburban trains were re-routed through the newly build tunnel beneath Berliner Straße. Nonetheless a train ride from Offenbach Central Station to Frankfurt Central Station takes only ten minutes.

=== Frankfurt Airport ===
The city is accessed from around the world via the Frankfurt Airport, (Flughafen Frankfurt am Main) which is located 12 kilometres (7.5 miles) from Offenbach. The airport can be reached by car or bus and has two train stations, one for regional and one for long-distance traffic. The S-Bahn lines S8 and S9 (direction "Offenbach Ost or "Hanau"), departing from the regional traffic station, take 25 minutes from the airport to get to Offenbach.

== Notable people ==
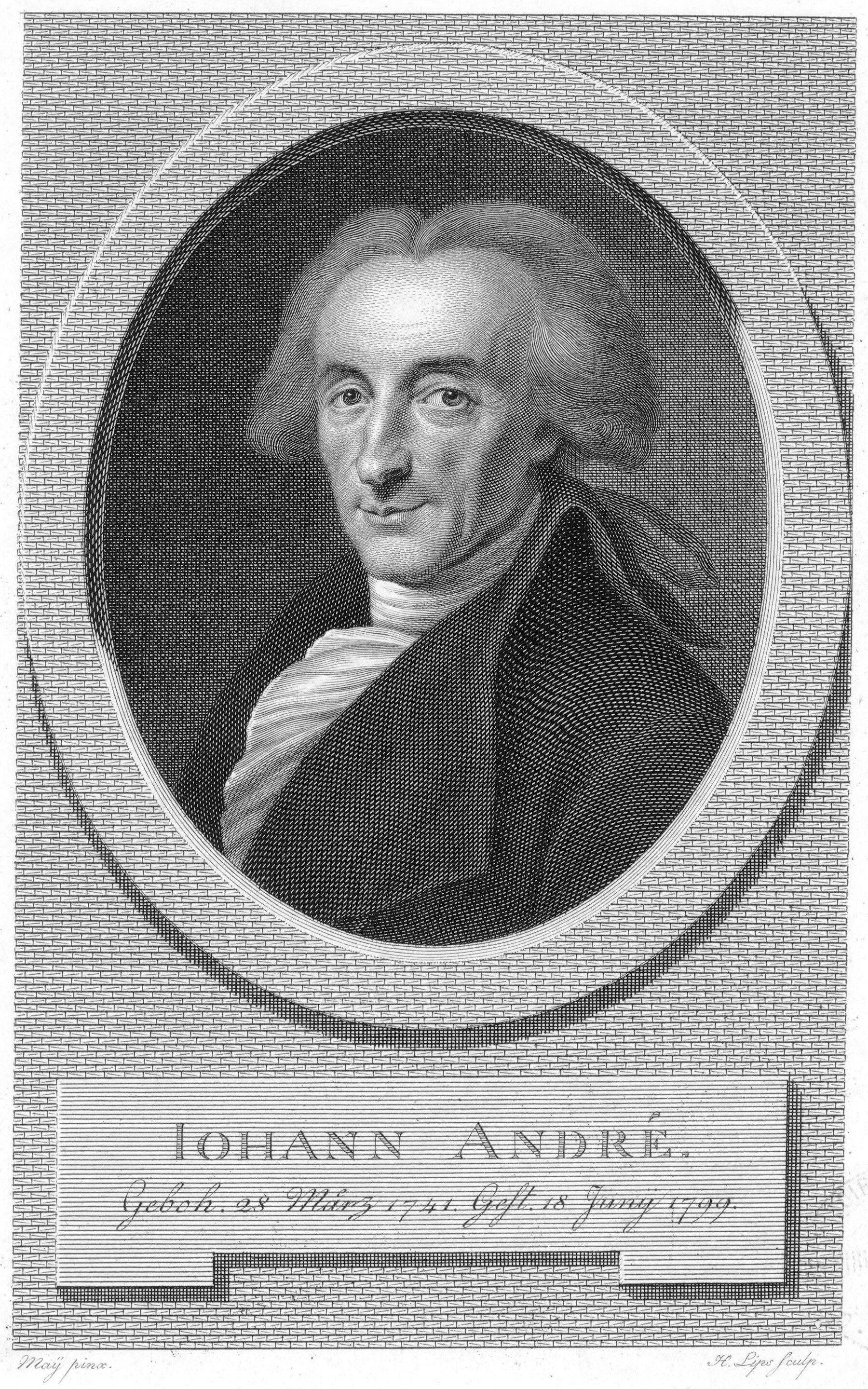
Johann André

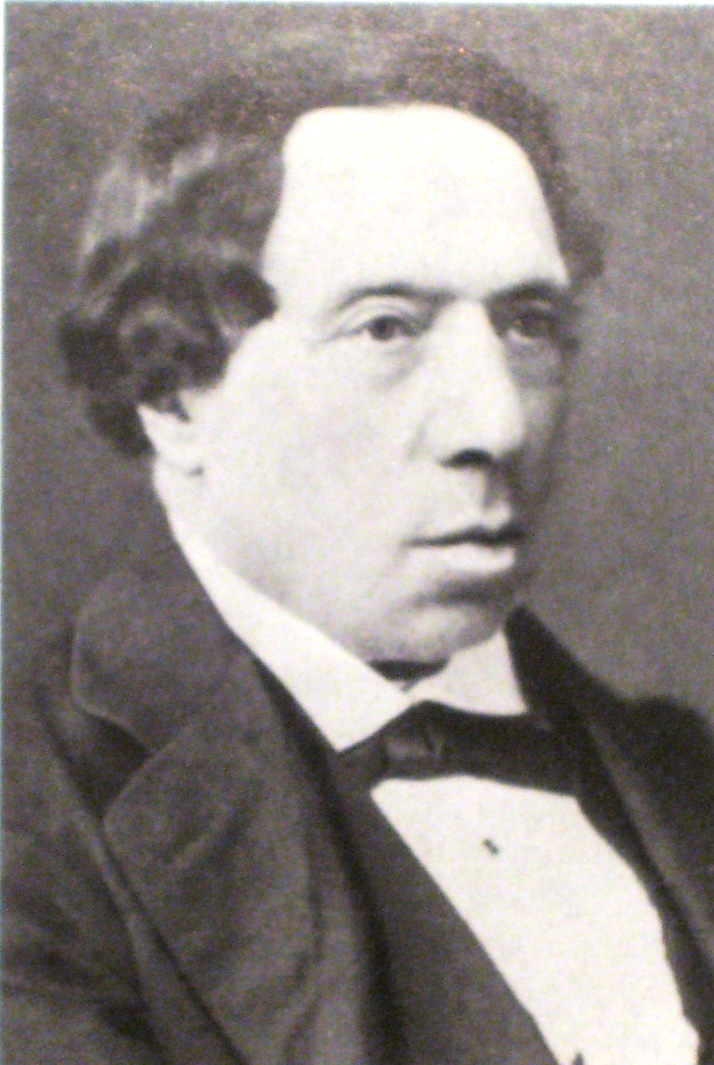
Salomon Formstecher

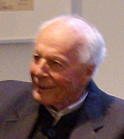
Gottfried Böhm

- Johann André (1741–1799), founder of the music publishing firm named after him
- Moritz Wilhelm August Breidenbach (1796–1857), jurist
- Salomon Formstecher (1808–1889), rabbi and philosopher
- Philipp Mainländer (1841–1876), poet and philosopher
- Siegfried Guggenheim (1873–1961), lawyer, notary and art collector
- Richard Heyne (1882–1961), member of Landtag and producer
- Christian Dell (1882–1974), industrial designer, factory designer on Bauhaus
- Hans Halberstadt (1885–1966), American fencer
- Prince Philipp of Hesse (1896–1980), prince and governor
- Bernard von Brentano (1901–1964), writer, essayist and journalist
- Heinrich von Brentano (1904–1964), conservative politician
- Berthold Wolpe (1905–1989), typographer and type designer
- Hans Hotter (1909–2003), opera singer
- Helene Mayer (1910–1953), fencer, Olympic champion
- Edith Schloss (1919–2011), artist, writer
- Gottfried Böhm (1920–2021), architect who won the Pritzker Architecture Prize in 1986
- Hermann Nuber (1935–2022), footballer
- Daniela Ziegler (born 1948), actress
- Ray Bumatai (1952–2005), musician, actor and singer
- Jimmy Hartwig (born 1954), football player, manager and actor
- Olli Dittrich (born 1956), actor and comedian
- René Rock (born 1967), German politician
- Smudo (born 1968), musician and rapper
- Sven Beckert (born 1969), history professor at Harvard, winner of 2015 Bancroft Prize for Empire of Cotton
- Helma Wennemers (born 1969), German organic chemist and professor
- Christian Lammert (born 1969), political scientist
- Christian Sievers (born 1969), journalist
- Tarek Al-Wazir (born 1971), politician, Deputy of the Hessian Minister-President
- Christoph Degen (born 1980), politician
- Aykut Anhan (born 1985), musician and rapper
- Jochen K. Roos (born 1990), politician

=== Notable residents ===
- Jacob Frank (1726–1791), Jewish religious leader
- Abraham Bing (1752–1841), rabbi
- Rudolf Koch (1876–1934), typeface designer, calligrapher and university professor
- Friedrich Kellner (1885–1970), official and justice inspector, attended Goethschule here
- Heinrich Kaminski (1886–1946), composer, worked here
- Ignatz Wiemeler (1895–1952), bookbinder and university professor
- Fritz Kredel (1900–1973), German-American artist and graphic designer, studied here
- Regina Jonas (1902–1944), first female Rabbi, ordained in Offenbach
- Karlgeorg Hoefer (1914–2000), calligrapher and typographer
- Cornelia Hanisch (born 1952), fencer, Olympic winner
- Dieter Müller (born 1954), footballer
- Rudi Völler (born 1960), football player and manager
- Götz Otto (born 1967), actor
- Anthony Rother (born 1972), electronic musician

== Gallery ==
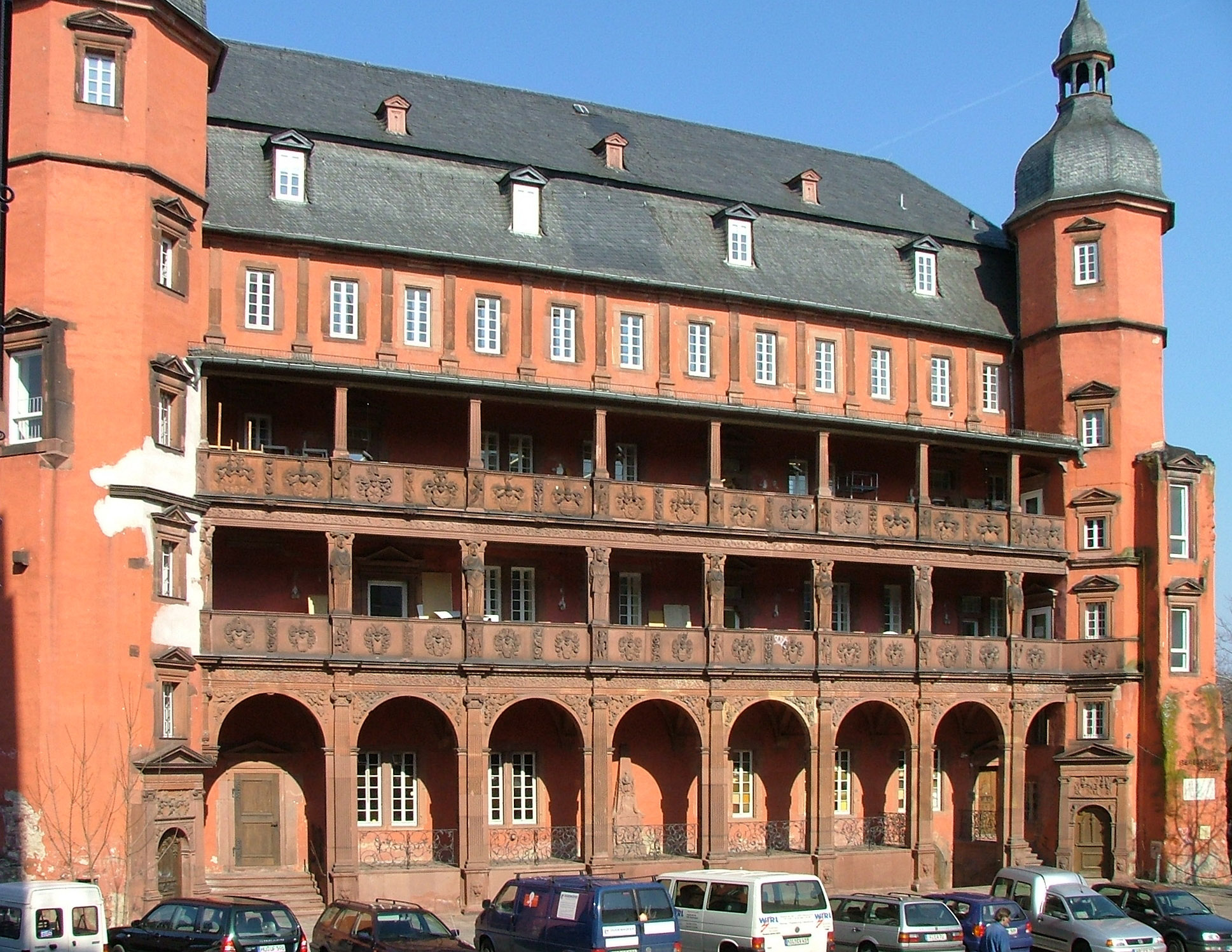
Isenburger Schloss

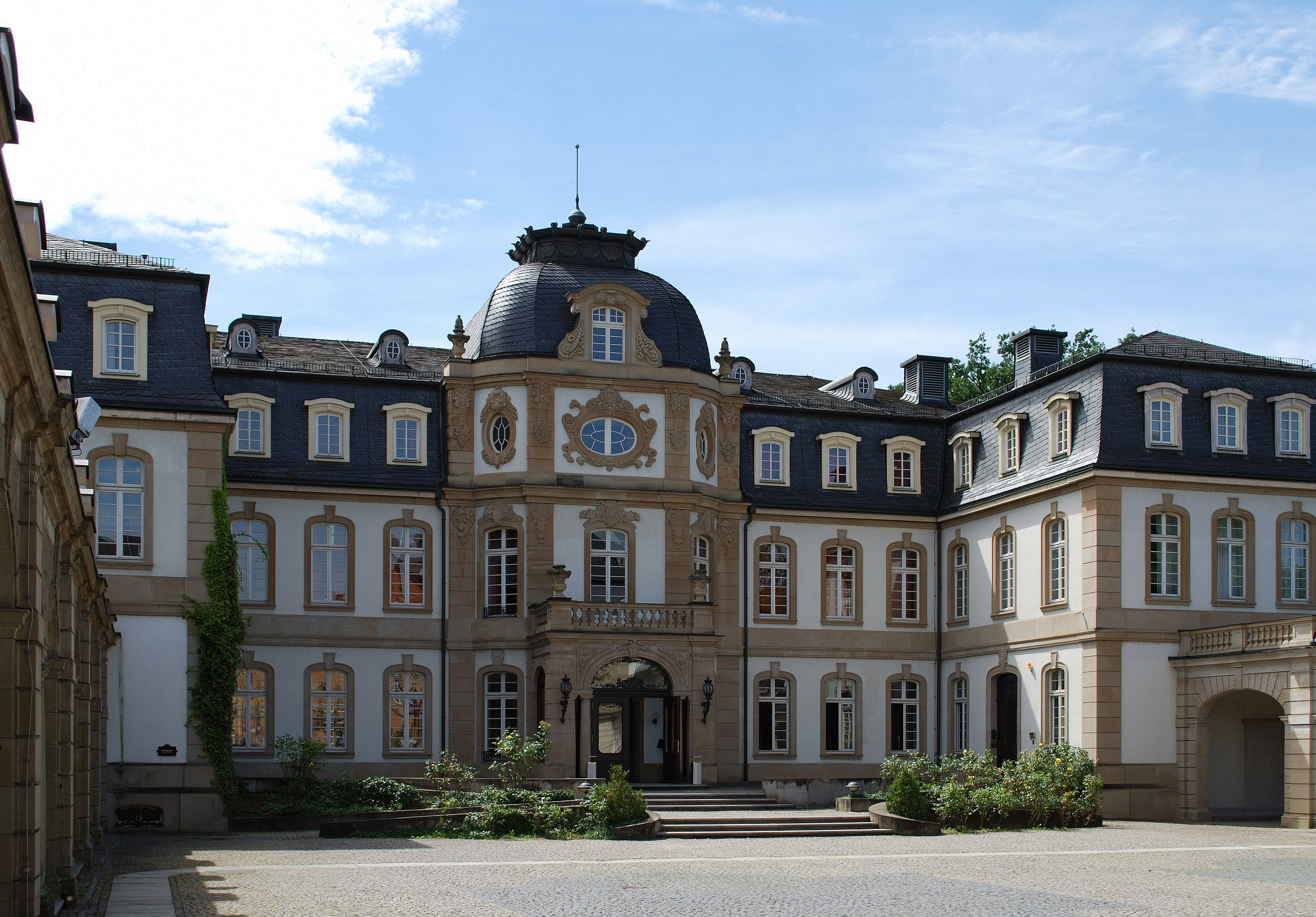
Büsingpalais

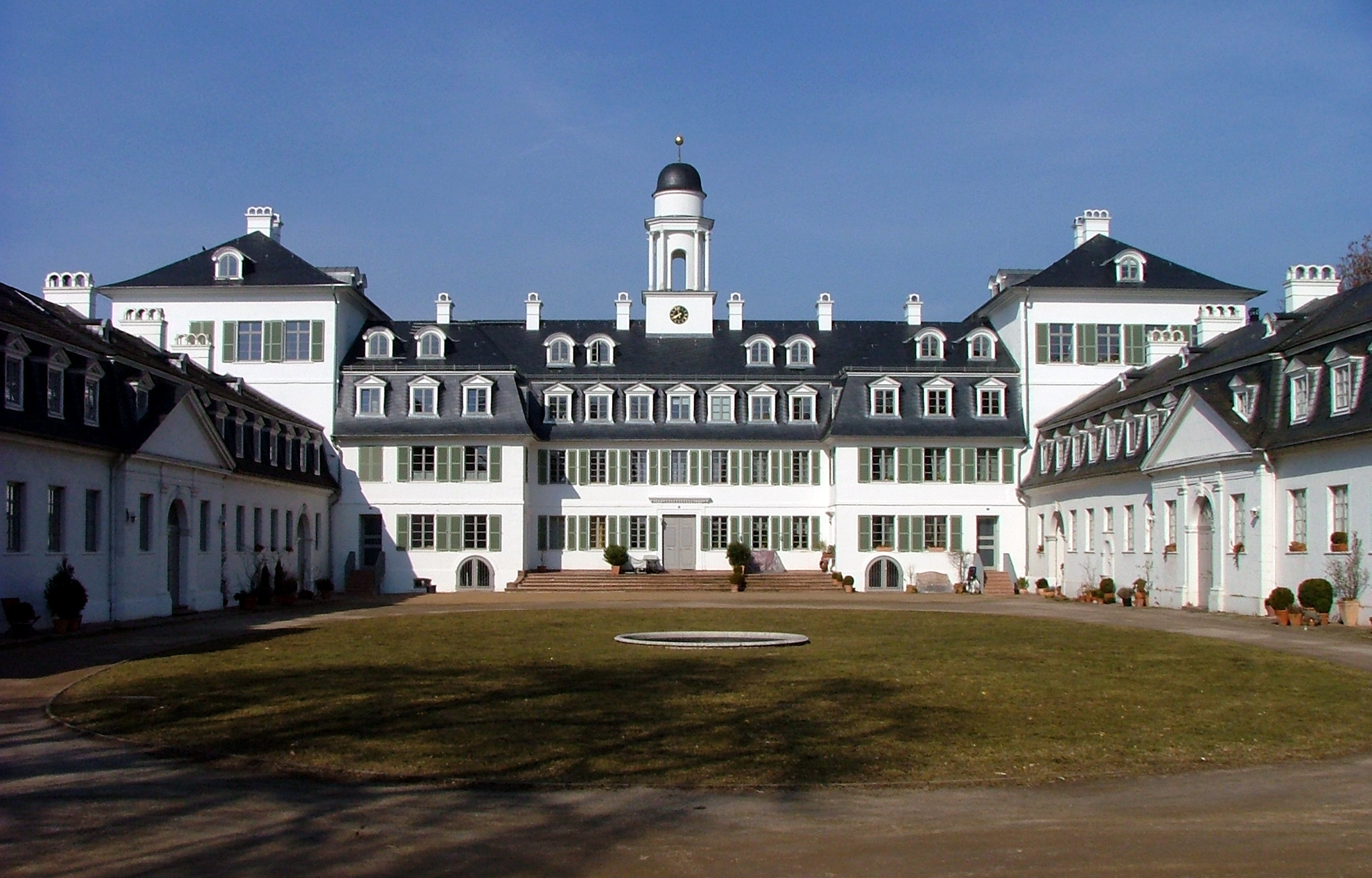
Rumpenheimer Schloss

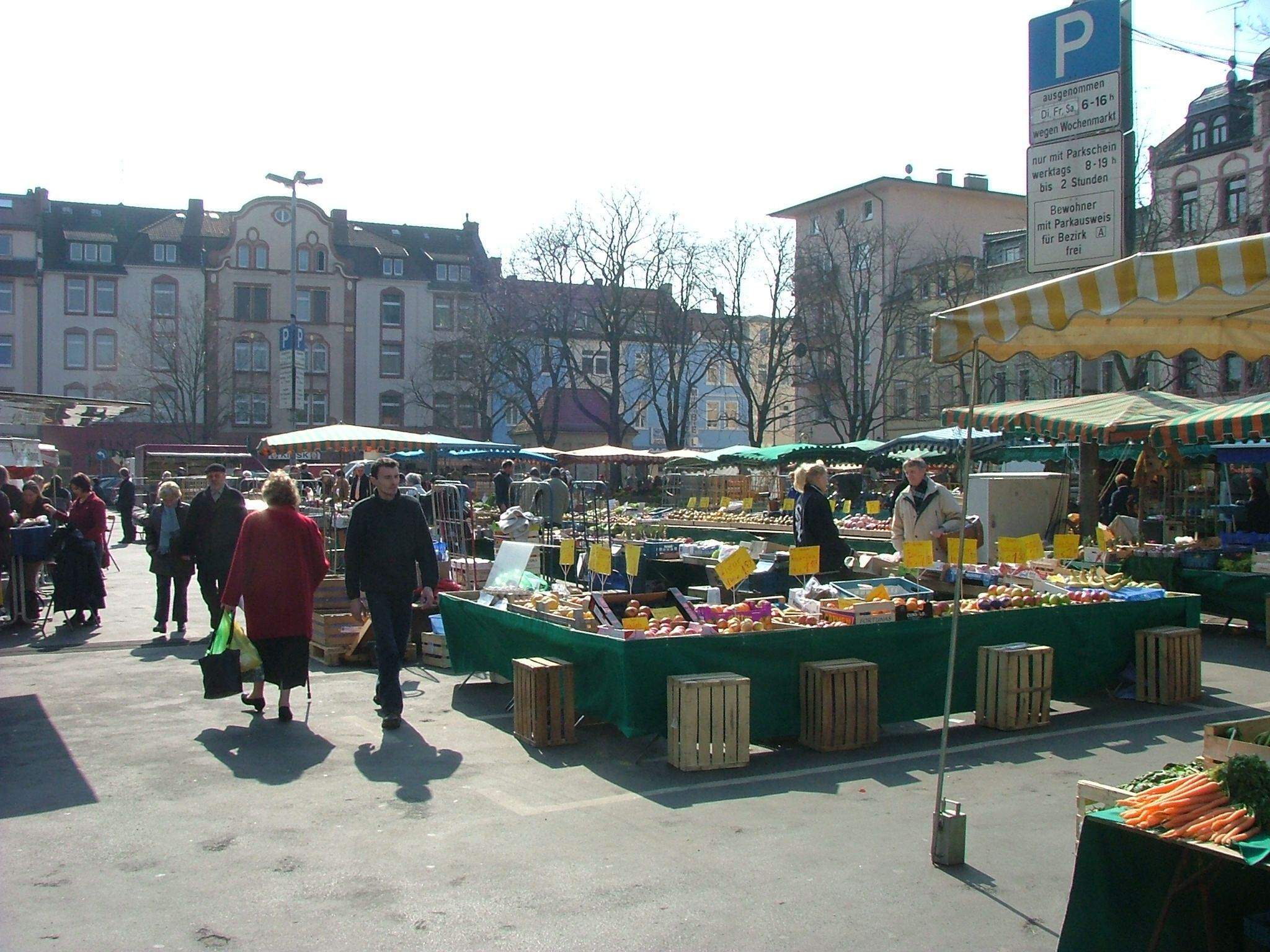
The market on Wilhelmsplatz

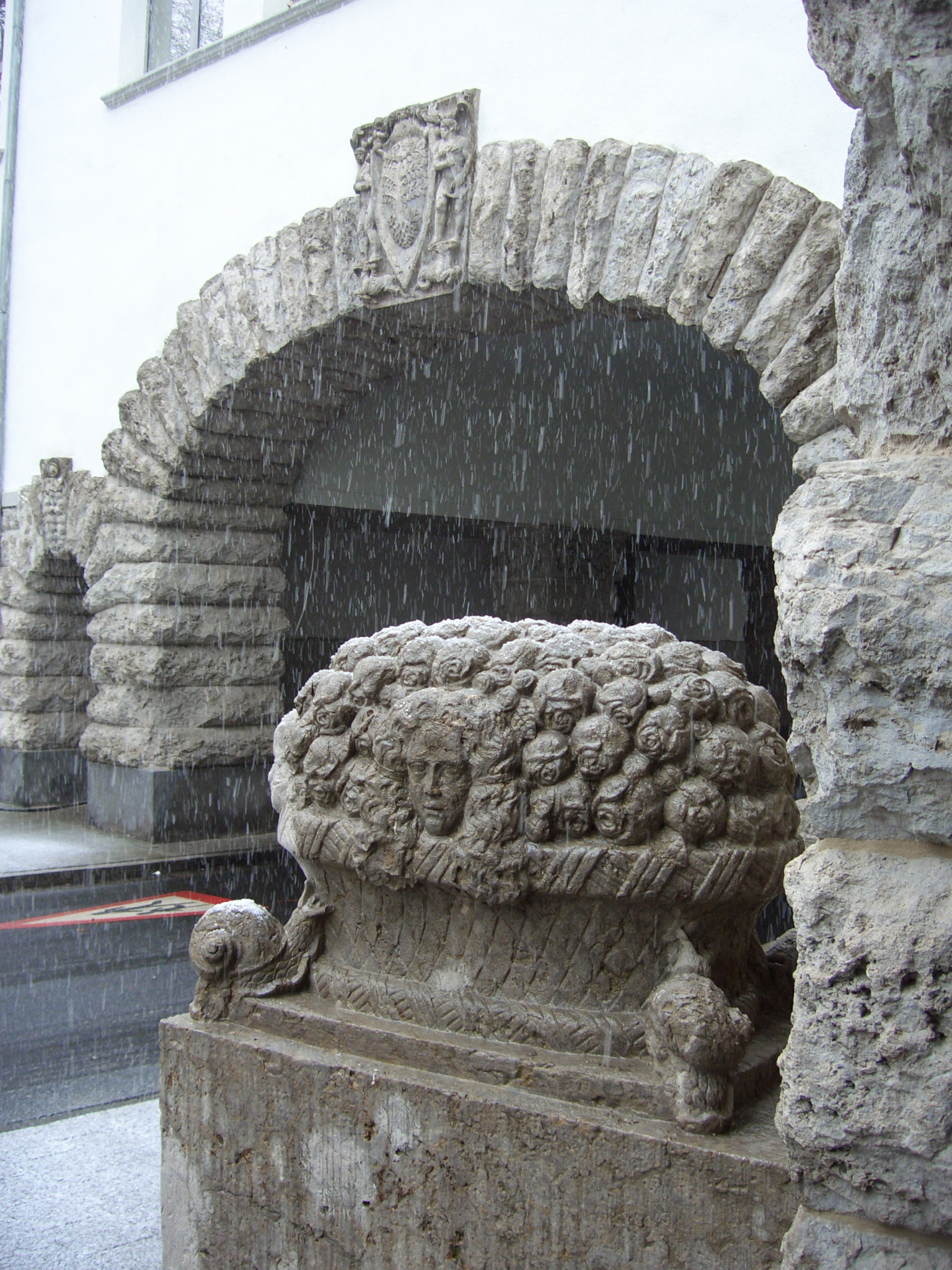
Detail at the building of the HfG, designed by Hugo Eberhardt

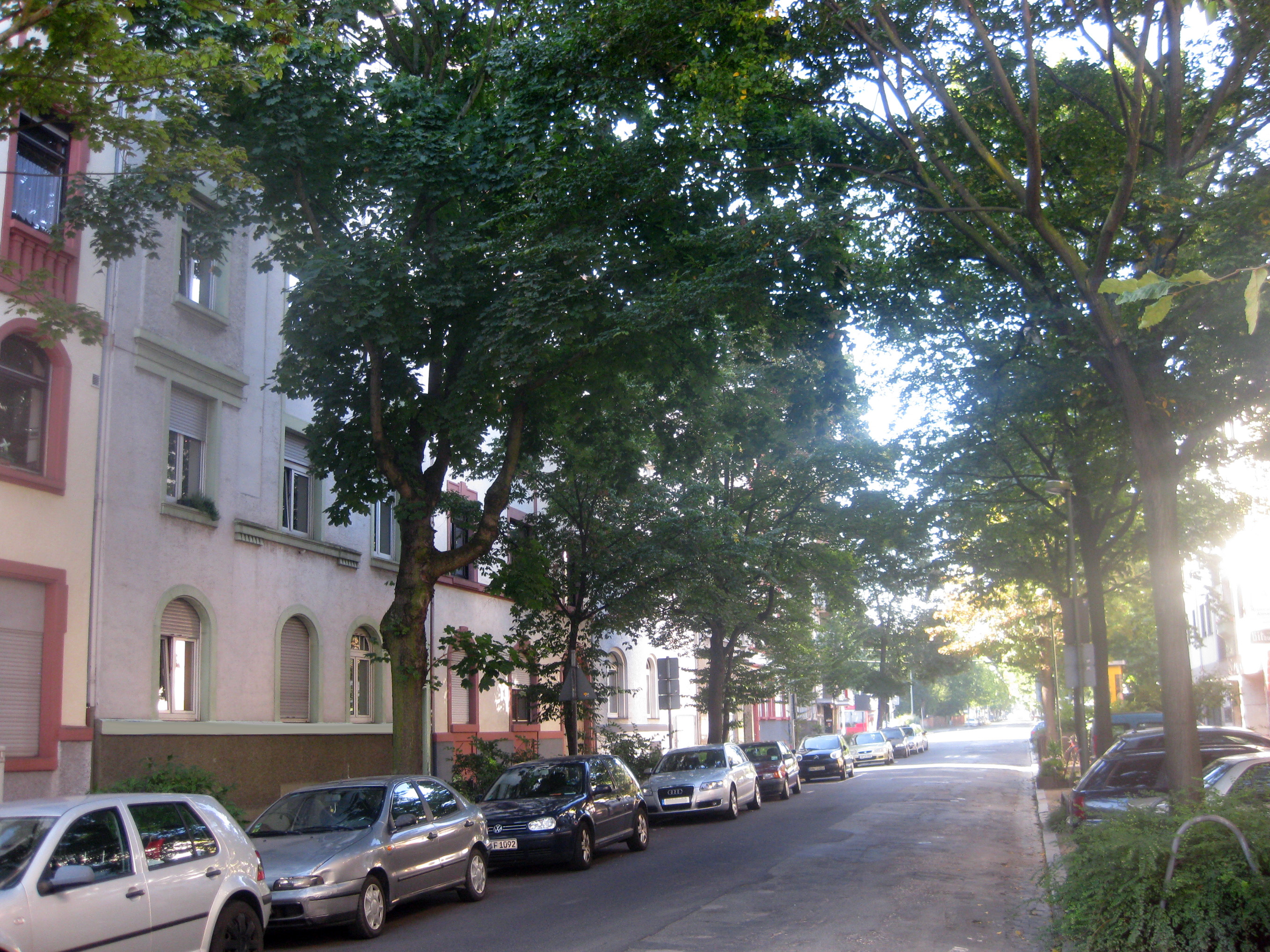
A typical street in Offenbach

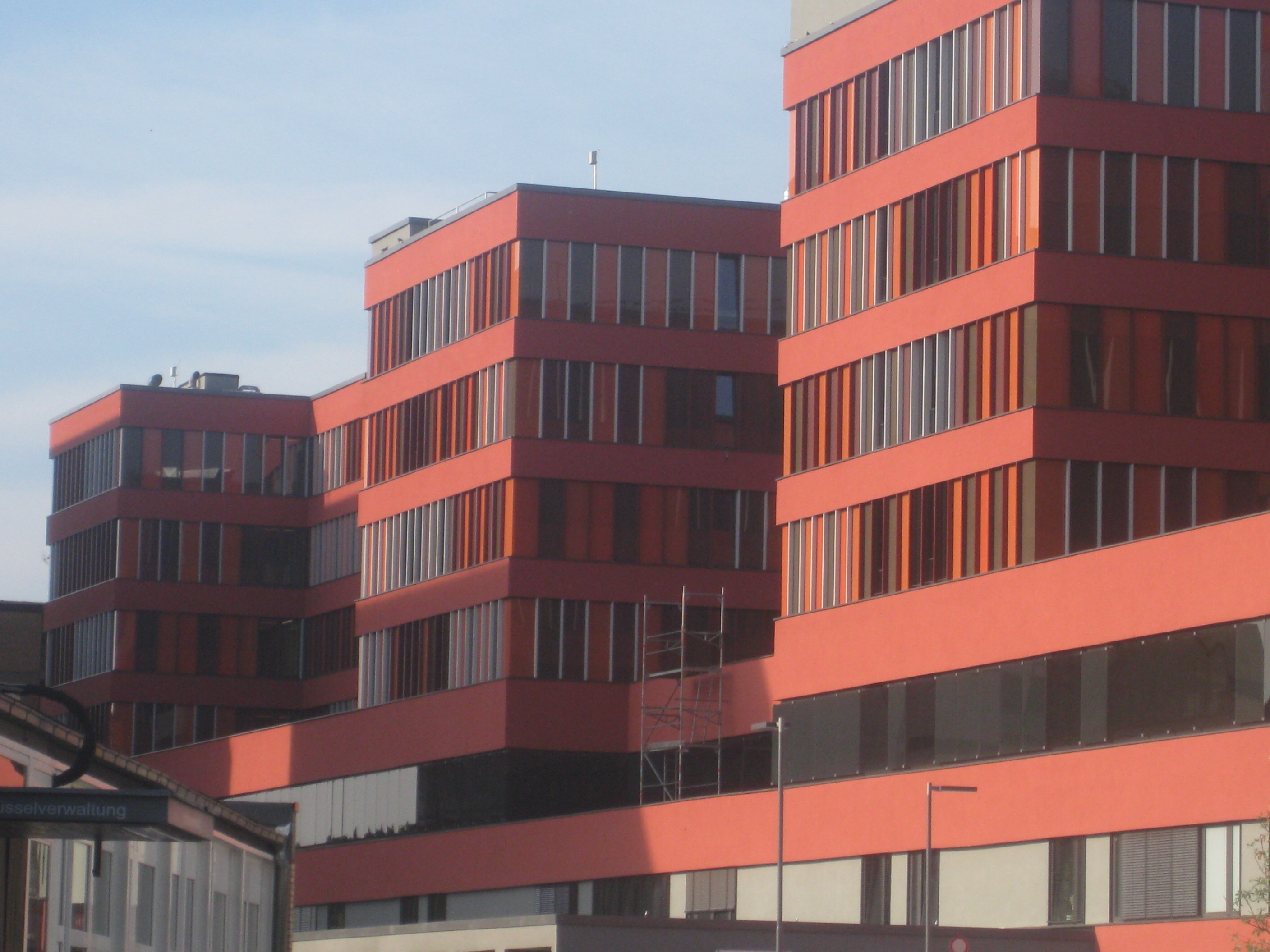
The municipal hospital

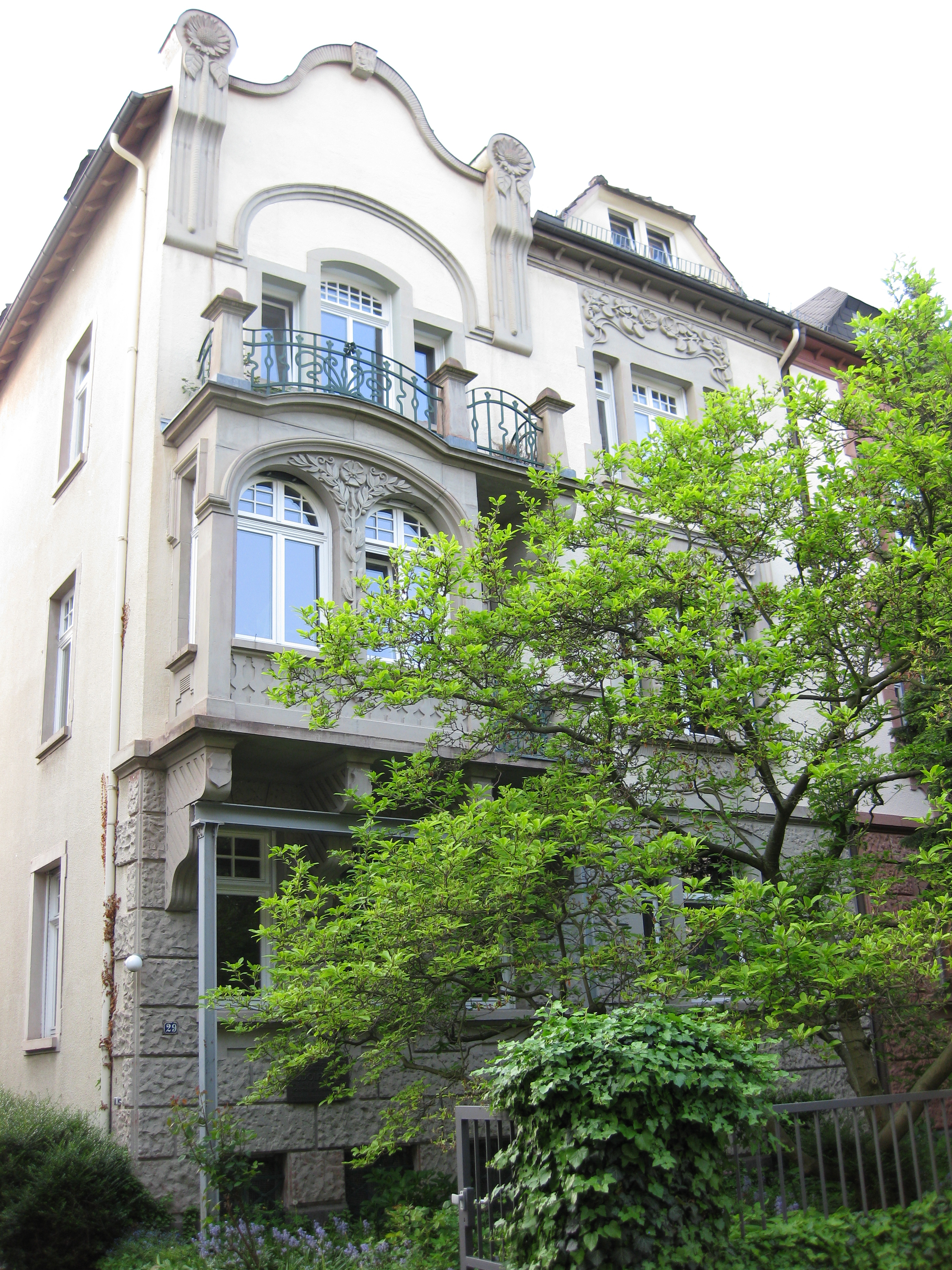
The house where Rudolf Koch lived, one of the art deco houses in the southwestern part of the town

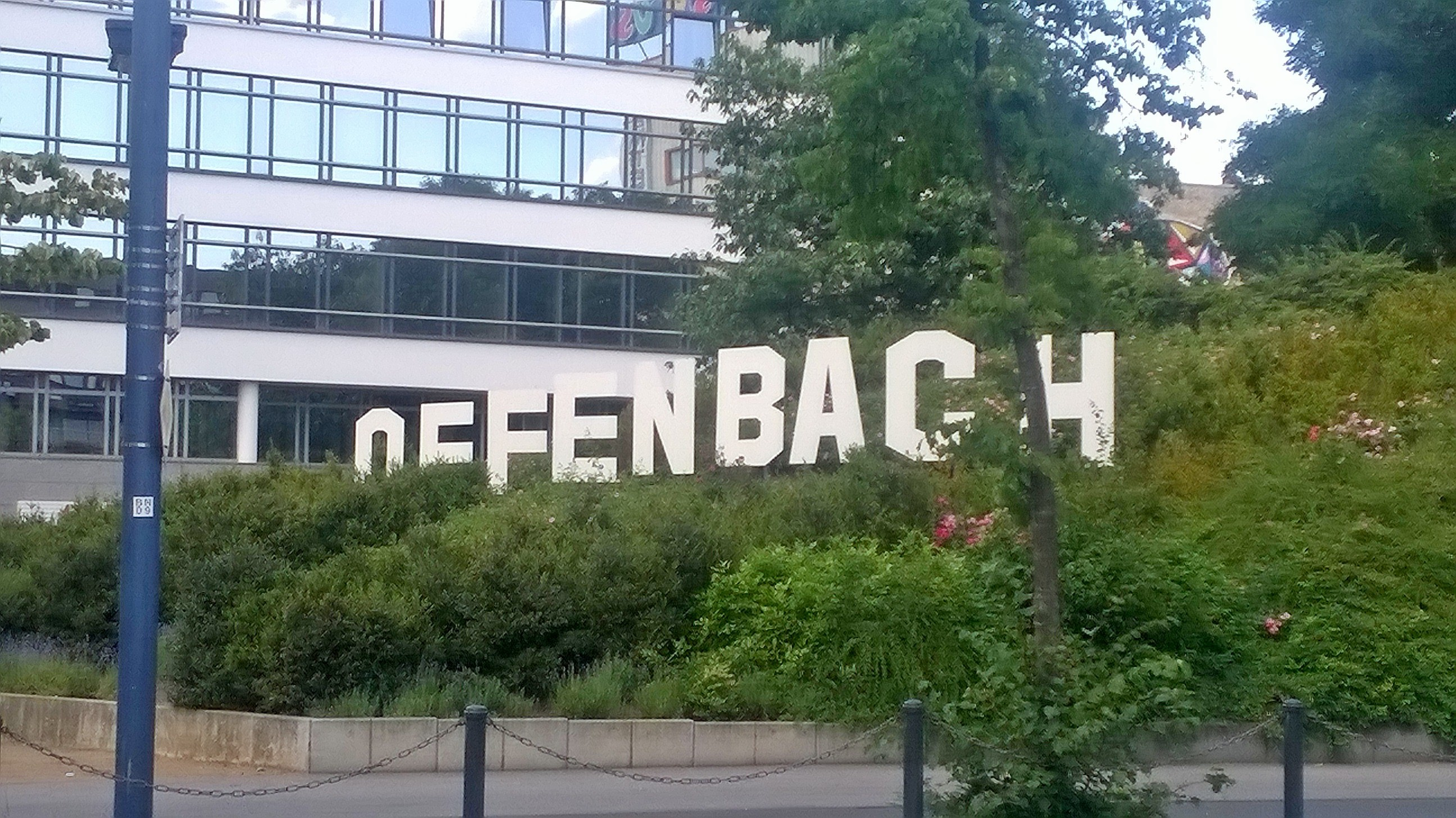
Offenbach hills
