= Jewish cemetery, Offenbach-Bürgel =

Jewish cemetery in Offenbach-Bürgel, Germany

Coordinates: 50.13022°N 8.77606°E

The Jewish cemetery Bürgel is an ancient Jewish cemetery in the suburb Bürgel of the German town Offenbach am Main. It is located at about 1.5 km north-east of the village centre of Bürgel, in the open field.

The Jewish community of Bürgel has used part of the area for burials since the 19th century. In 1821, the community bought the entire area of the current cemetery, but could only build a wall around it in 1842, due to financial constraints. The last known burial took place in 1938, before the Jewish community was erased during the Holocaust.

Today, Jews in Bürgel are members of the Jewish community of Offenbach and bury their dead in the Jewish sections of the cemetery in Bürgel or Offenbach's new or old cemeteries.
