= Siegfried Guggenheim =

German notary and lawyer (1873–1961)

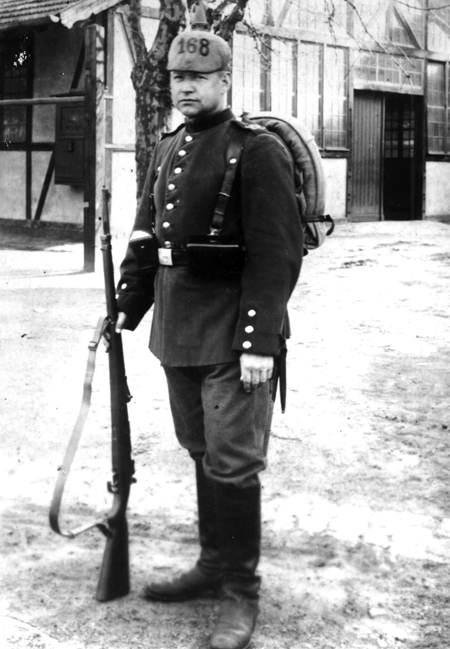
Siegfried Guggenheim, 1916

Siegfried Guggenheim (1873–1961) was a German lawyer, notary and art collector. He emigrated from Germany to the United States in 1938 due to fear of persecution due to his Jewish faith.

== Biography ==
Guggenheim was born to Jewish parents in 1873. His father was a merchant. In 1900, he became the jurist doctorate in Offenbach, working as a lawyer. In 1919, he became a notary public order. Guggenheim was heavily engaged in Offenbach's cultural and social life and was a member of many organizations. He enjoyed fine arts and Jewish culture. He was a patron to the artist Rudolf Koch. From Guggenheim's patronage emerged two great works: The Offender Haggadah tapestries, which can be found in the Klingspor Museum, and the so-called Offenbacher Haggadah, a tapestry by Fritz Kredel.

He also participated in the lively Jewish life. He was a member of the Central Association of German citizens of Jewish faith, and from 1933 to 1939 chairman of the Offenbach Jewish community. He initiated 1912 with Max Goldschmidt, the then chairman of the Jewish community, the construction of a synagogue in Offenbach.

With the seizure of power by the Nazis in 1933, his notary license was withdrawn. In November 1938, Guggenheim lost his license to practice law. He was deported to the Buchenwald concentration camp on November 9, 1938, making him a victim of Kristallnacht. After a few weeks he was released in December under the condition that he must leave Germany. Later that month, he emigrated with his wife, Eugenie (1878-1984) to Flushing, New York. Their German citizenship was officially withdrawn in 1941. The Guggenheim's correspondence with the Frankfurt journalist and social worker Martha Wertheimer during their stay in the United States survived the war.

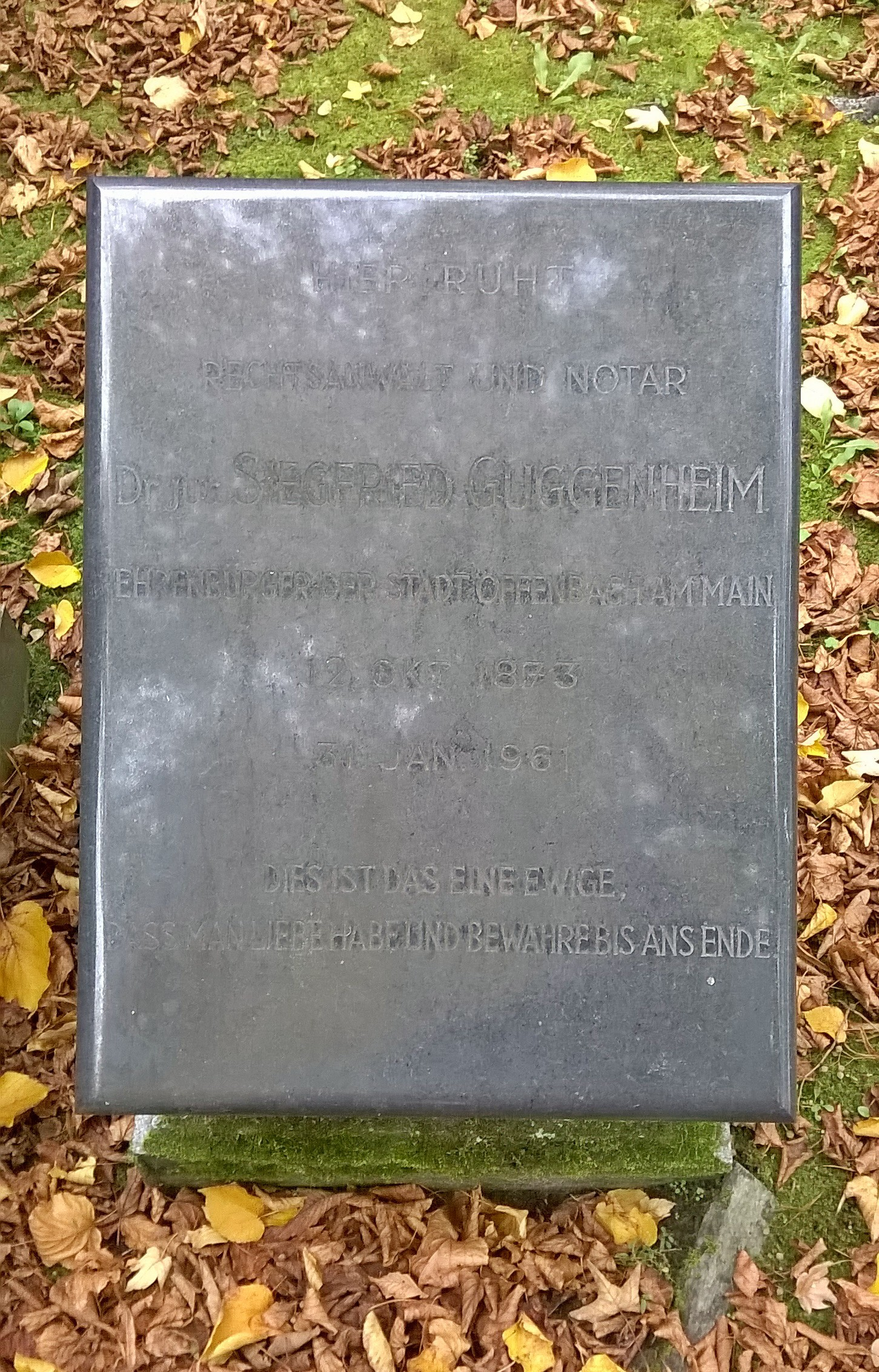
Grave of Siegfried Guggenheim

In 1948, the city of Offenbach appointed Siegfried Guggenheim an honorary citizen and named a street after him. Siegfried Guggenheim died in 1961, while his wife outlived him, dying in 1984. Both he and his wife were cremated after their deaths and their urns were buried in Offenbach.

== Notes ==
- Fritz Bauer Institute (ed.): Martha Wertheimer: "In me is the great dark silence came" Letters to Siegfried Guggenheim in New York. Written by 27.5.1939 - 2.9.1941, Frankfurt am Main, 1996
- Dr. Ed Guggenheim: Offenbacher Haggadah. Illustrations by Fritz Kredel, 1927 (2nd edition 1960).
