= Offenbach-Lauterborn =

Lauterborn
- Quarter of Offenbach am Main
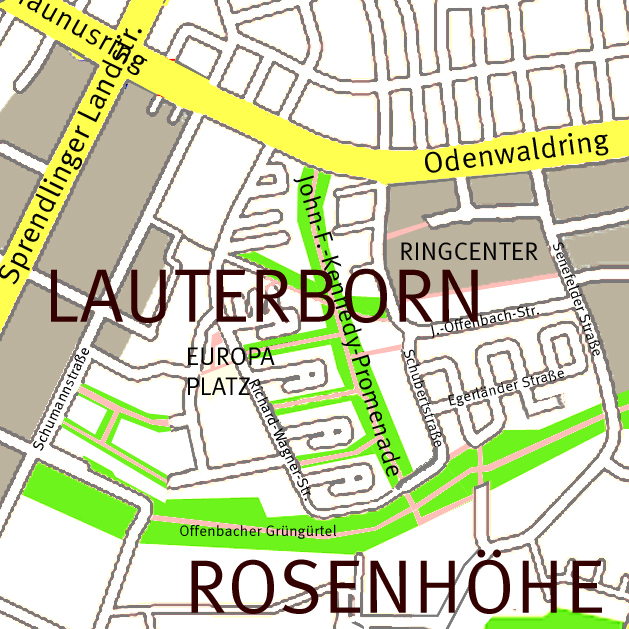
- Map of Lauterborn
- Interactive map of Lauterborn
- Location within Germany Location within Hesse
- Coordinates: 50°05′08″N 8°45′32″E
- Country: Germany
- State: Hesse
- Admin. region: Darmstadt
- District: Urban district
- Town: Offenbach am Main

Area
  - Total: 39.14 km^{2} (15.11 sq mi)

Population (2020-12-31)
  - Total: 9,507
  - Density: 242.9/km^{2} (629.1/sq mi)
- Time zone: UTC+01:00 (CET)
  - Summer (DST): UTC+02:00 (CEST)
- Postal codes: 63069
- Dialling codes: 069

Lauterborn is a quarter (Stadtteil) of Offenbach am Main, Germany, with approximately 9,500 inhabitants (2020). It is located in the south-east part of the town and borders Frankfurt and the municipal forest.

== History ==
Lauterborn was the historic name of a fountain. The district was built from the 1960s on with terraced houses and apartment blocks. A half dozen atrium houses were constructed by the famous architect Egon Eiermann. The central park is called "John-F.-Kennedy-Promenade".

Until the 1990s there were some smaller factories and a truck garage of the US Army next to Lauterborn. These facilities closed and offices and the distribution center Briefzentrum 63 of the Deutsche Post were built. Honda Europa (North) has its headquarters in Lauterborn. In 1999 opened the shopping mall "Ring-Center".

== Gallery ==
Impressions of Lauterborn
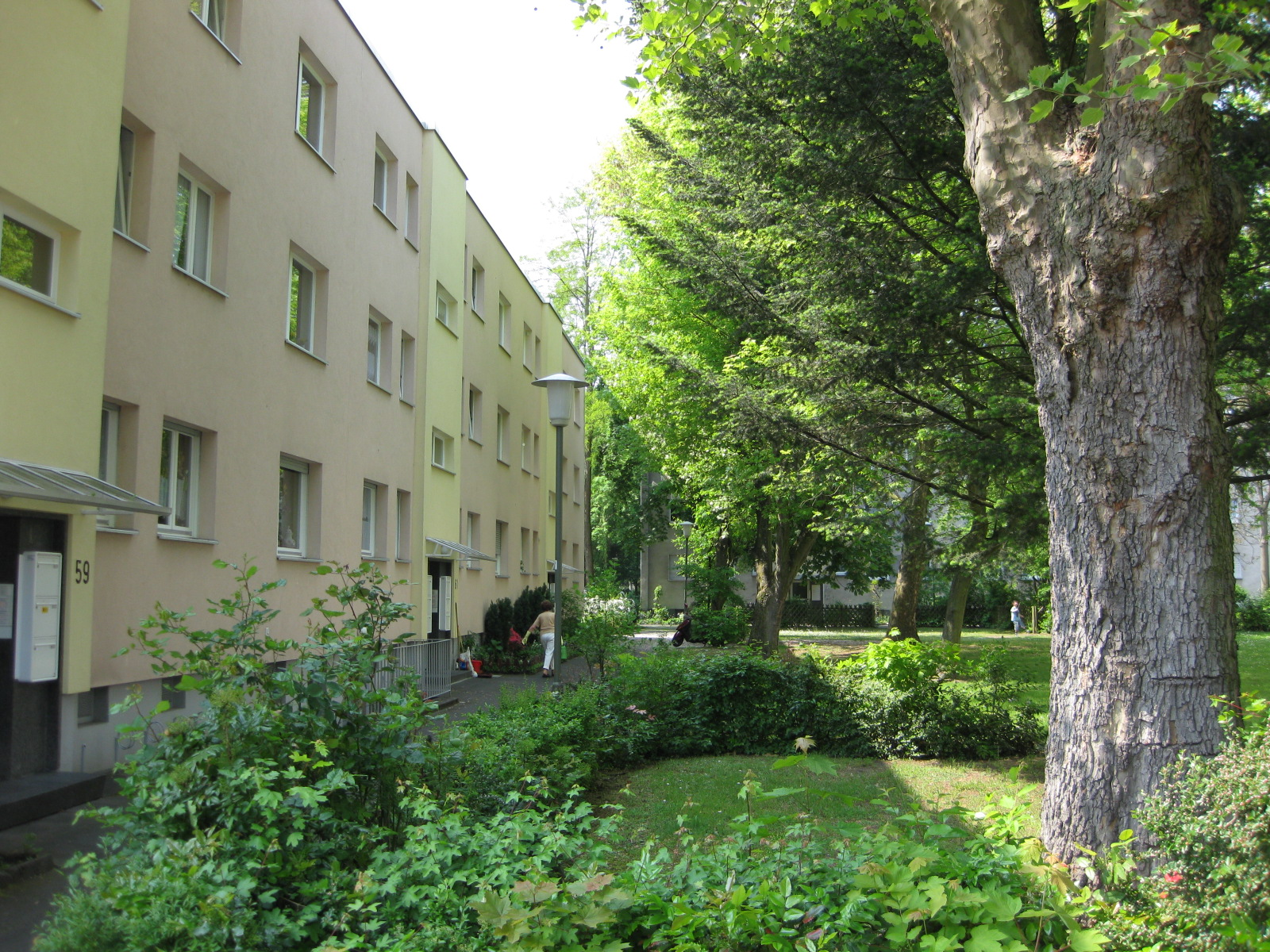
The typical houses in Lauterborn

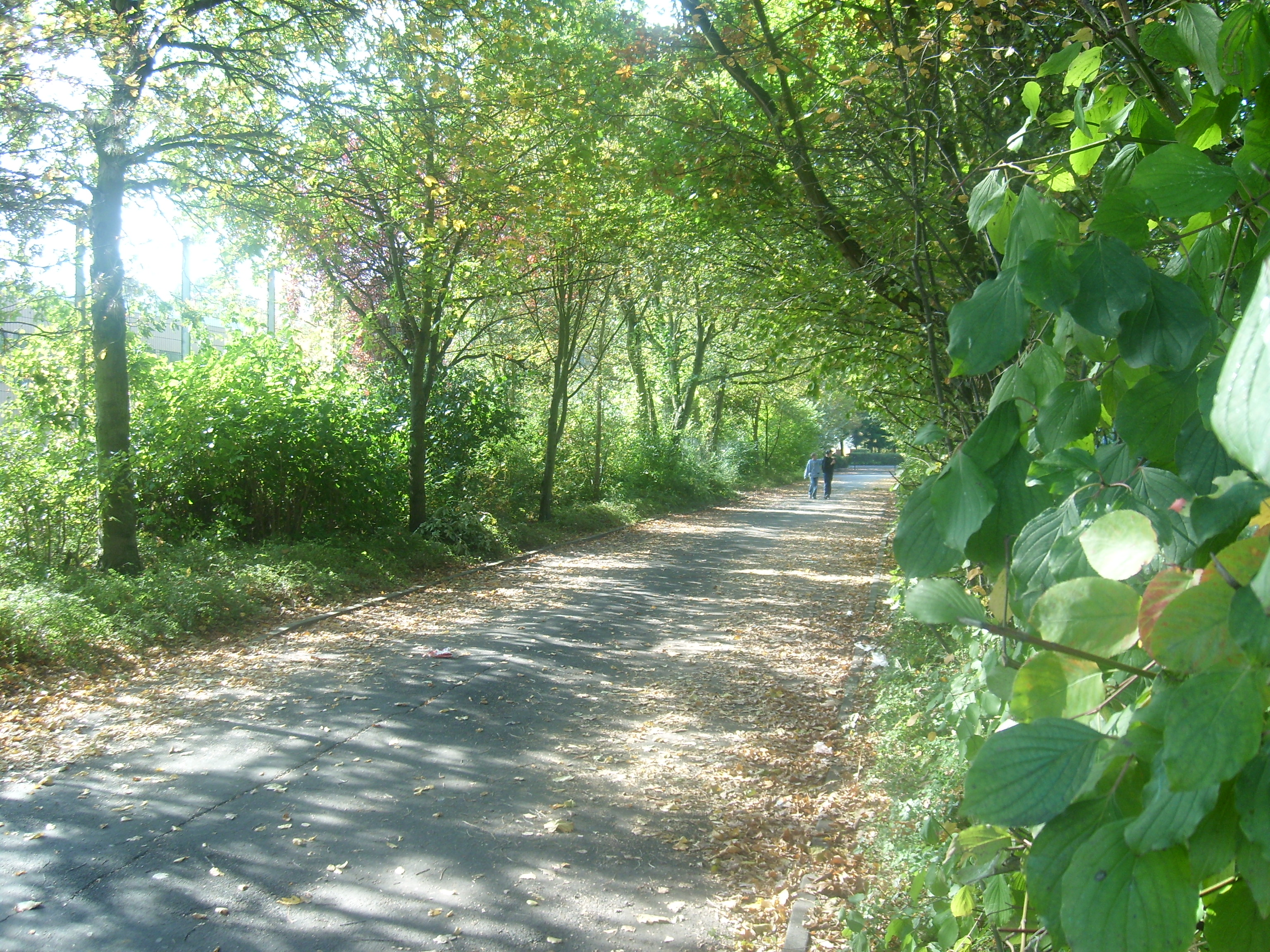
John-F.-Kennedy-Promenade

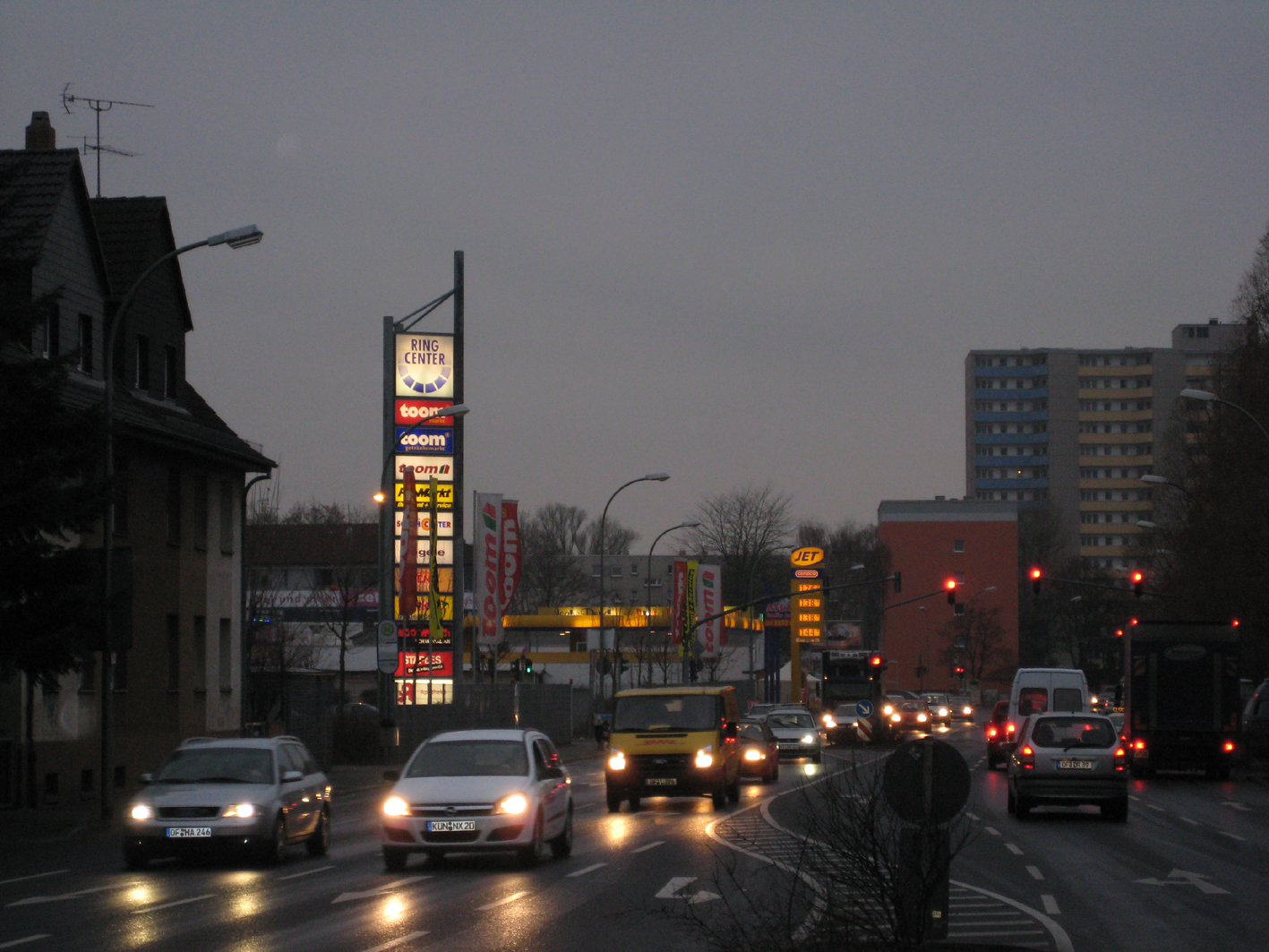
The Odenwaldring drive

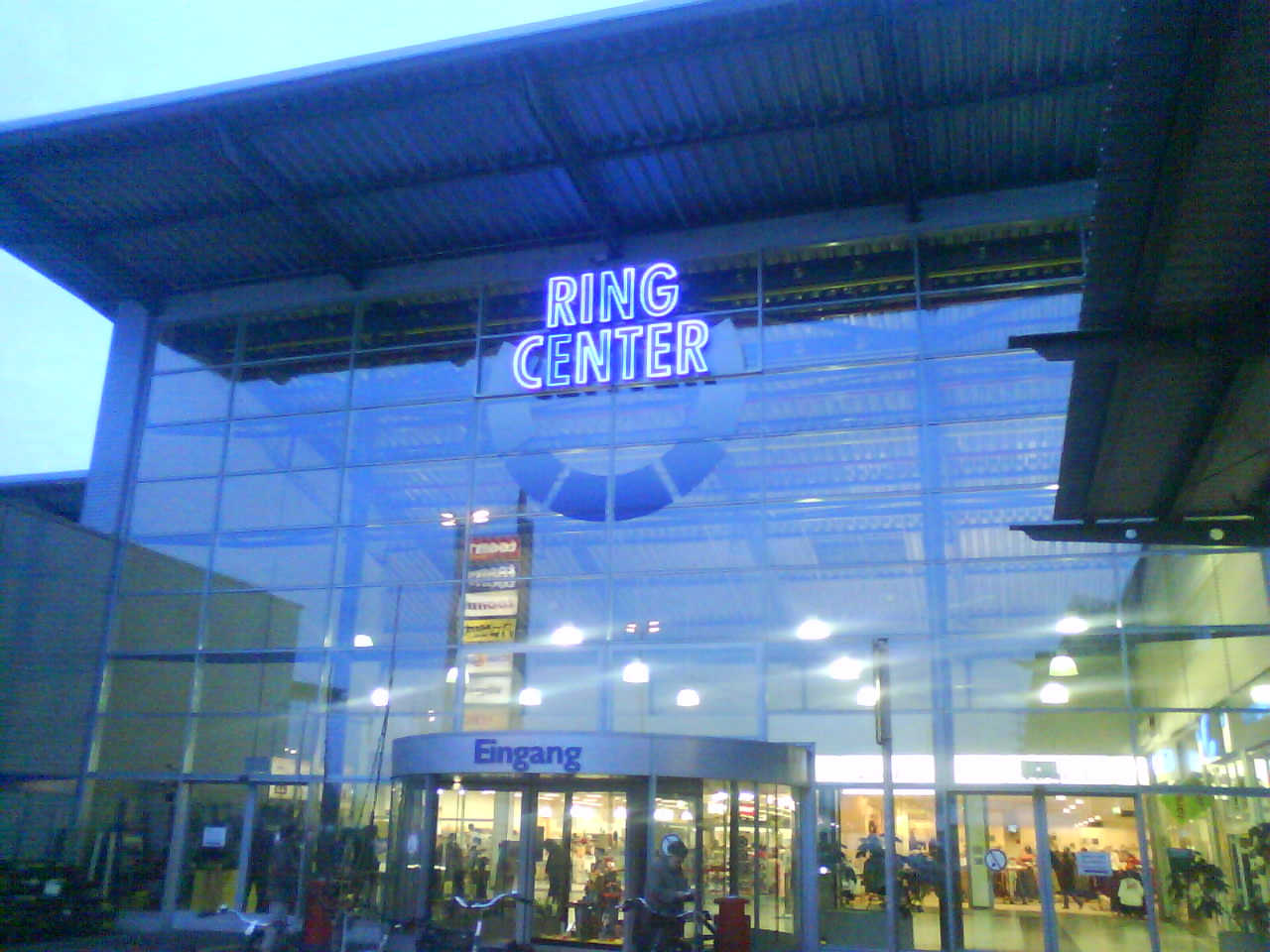
Shopping Mall Ring-Center
