= Offenbach-Rosenhöhe =

Borough of Offenbach am Main, Germany

Coordinates: 50.0789°N 8.7611°E

Rosenhöhe (or Rosenhoehe) is one of the 21 boroughs of Offenbach am Main, Germany. It is the city's southernmost borough and the second smallest by population with only 1,396 inhabitants. Until 2019 it was one of the nine officially recognized boroughs. When in July 2019 the city council approved a bill to fully divide the city's area into boroughs, Rosenhöhe became the second largest by area after Bieber. The total area is 7,08 km^{2} (2,73 sq mi).

The location of Rosenhöhe within the city of Offenbach

Rosenhöhe borders the boroughs of Carl-Ulrich-Siedlung and Lauterborn in the north, Buchrain in the west and Tempelsee in the east. The southern border of Rosenhöhe is shared with the Offenbach city limits, bordering the towns of Neu-Isenburg, Dreieich and Heusenstamm.

Most of its area is occupied by forests and is a landscape preservation area. Built-up area is only found in the northern tip of the borough.

== History ==
After World War II Rosenhöhe was built as a small residential area out in the Hinterwald what the forest in the south-west of Offenbach is commonly called. Before the city of Offenbach expanded southwards a tarpit was located in the area around Rosenhöhe. Several tumuli (or burial mounds) can be found in the area. Many date back to the Iron Age and trace the early human settlement in the region.

During World War II lights were ignited in the forest near Rosenhöhe to divert the allied air raid attacks away from the major manufacturing companies in the city. Many bomb craters still indicate this part of history today.

The origin of the name "Rosenhöhe" is not really known. It generally translates to "Rose Heights" or "Rose Hill".

== Sports and Recreation ==
Sport and recreation play a major role in the borough. The only remaining public swimming pool of the city is found in Rosenhöhe as well as one of the largest municipal sportsgrounds. After football (soccer), tennis is the predominant sport practiced in the neighborhood. A total of twenty tennis courts is in operation by different clubs including the headquarters of the Tennis Association of the State of Hesse. Other practiced sports are athletics, rugby and beach volleyball. Biking, hiking and outdoor sports in the nearby forests are also a very popular activities, especially in the summer month.

Several restaurants offer a broad selection of cuisines for day trippers and residents. The range lasts from steakhouses to traditional apple cider pubs which the Rhine-Main region is known for. The high density of restaurants is correlated to the number of sports clubs in the borough. Traditionally every club hosts at least some kind of restauration for its members. These restaurants or pubs are generally open to the public. Probably the most notable establishment is the Gasthaus Wildhof. A traditional inn along "Dietzenbacher Straße" that exists since the 1700s.

== Education ==
Edith-Stein-Schule is a "integrierte Gesamtschule" and offers all levels of secondary education from grade 5 to 12. In 2019 around 750 students attended the school educated by 30 teachers.

Marianne-Frostig-Schule is a private middle school that focuses on Montessori education. For recess, school children can make use of a 16,000 m^{2} (17,222 sq ft) large part of the Hinterwald forest as a part of their school yard.

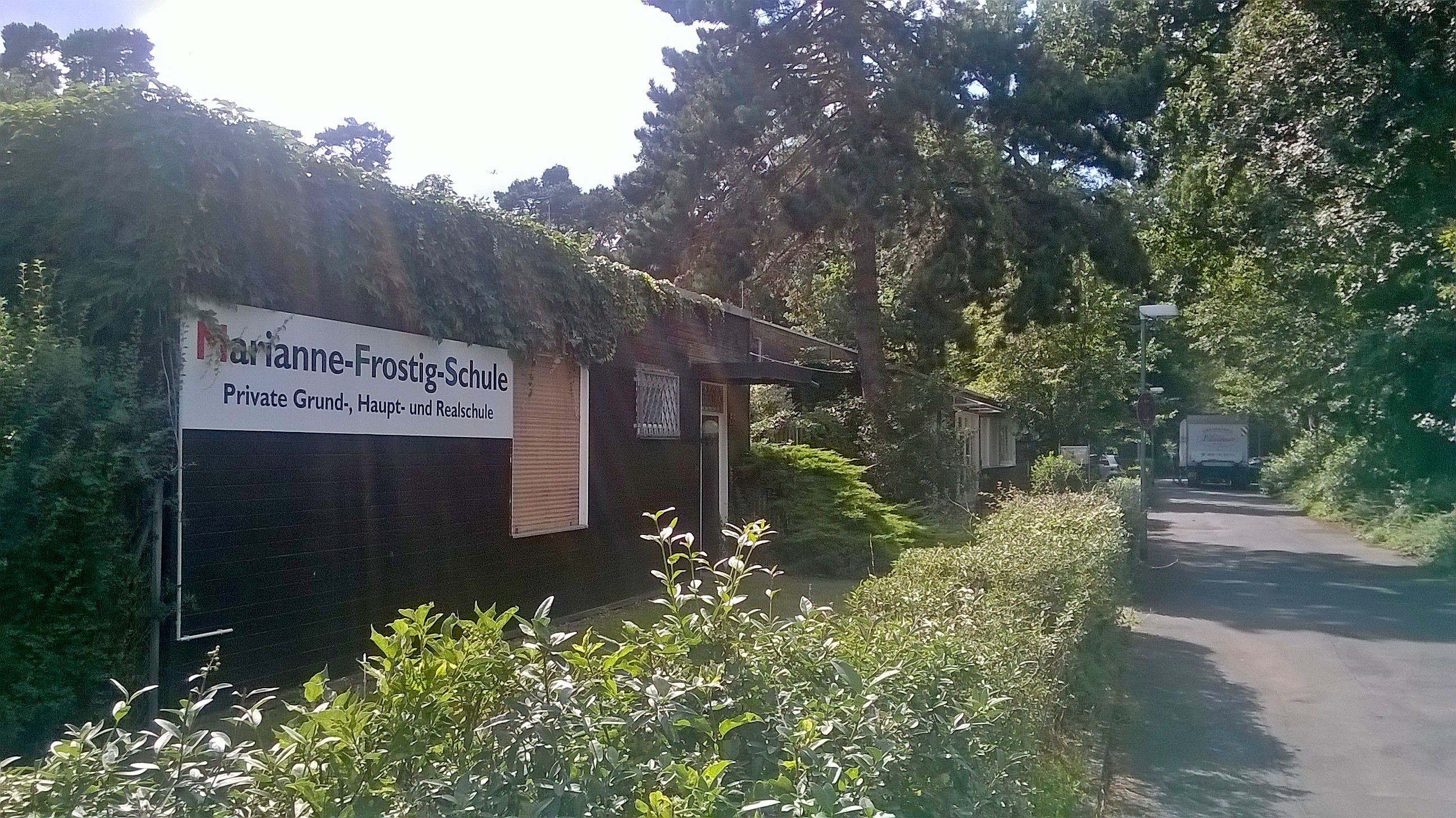
Marianne-Frostig-Schule

Oswald-von-Nell-Breuning-Schule is a private school for children with special needs. The school is an attachment of the Theresienheim orphanage.

Primary education is provided by the Anne-Frank-Schule which is not located in the borough itself, but in the neighboring borough of Carl-Ulrich-Siedlung. The city of Offenbach also operates a preschool and day care center in the borough.

== Infrastructure ==
Main roads are "Dietzenbacher Straße", also known Hessian State Route 3001 and "Gravenbruchweg". Both give access to downtown Offenbach and the surrounding towns and neighborhoods. Autobahn-route A3 traverses the Hinterwald forest in the south of the borough. The Autobahn A3 is one of the most important and most frequented highways in Germany. The exit number 52 "Offenbach-Süd" is within the boundaries of the borough but there is no direct access to Rosenhöhe. Instead exit number 52 feeds "Sprendlinger Landstraße", a major thoroughfare of Offenbach.

The Borough of Rosenhöhe is served by bus routes 104 and 105 of the city's municipal bus network (Offenbacher Verkehrsbetriebe). Both routes operate with a 15-minute headway during working days and a 30-minute headway after 8:00 p.m. and on Sundays.

The public utility works of the city of Offenbach operate an incineration plant in Rosenhöhe, south of the Autobahn overpass. With an annual input of 250,000 to 300,000 metric tons of waste, the plant generates about 200,000 MWh of district heat and 75,000 MWh of electricity per year.
