= Bertsch =

Bertsch is a surname. Notable people with the surname include:

- Georg-Christof Bertsch (born 1959), German corporate identity and organizational behavior consultant
- George F. Bertsch (born 1942), American nuclear physicist
- Marguerite Bertsch (1889–1967), American screenwriter and film director
- Matthias Bertsch (born 1966), German-born Austrian musicologist
- Mike Bertsch, American ice hockey player and coach
- Shane Bertsch (born 1970), American golfer
- Tim Bertsch (born 1971), American musical composer and performer

== See also ==
- Bertsch-Oceanview, California, a census-designated place in Del Norte County, California, United States
