= HFG =

HFG may refer to:

- Hana Financial Group, a South Korean holding company
- Harry Frank Guggenheim Foundation
- Hochschule für Gestaltung, (German: College for design)
  - Ulm School of Design (German: Hochschule für Gestaltung Ulm), defunct
  - Hochschule für Gestaltung Offenbach
  - Hochschule für Gestaltung Schwäbisch Gmünd
  - Karlsruhe University of Arts and Design (German: Staatliche Hochschule für Gestaltung Karlsruhe)
