= Peter Zizka =

German designer and conceptual artist

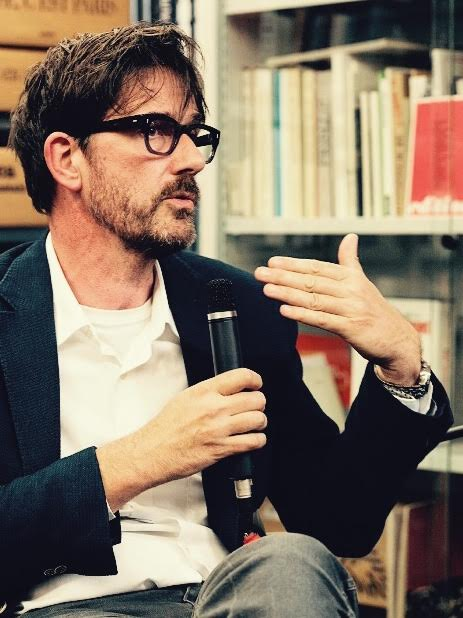
- Peter Zizka giving a design talk in Berlin
- Born: 16 December 1961 (age 64)
- Education: Hochschule für Gestaltung Offenbach; Städelschule; Bruce McLean
- Known for: conceptual art
- Notable work: The Virtual Minefield; MEMORY 1–24
- Movement: MEMORY
- Elected: German Designers Club

Peter Zizka (born 16 December 1961) is a German designer and conceptual artist.

== Life ==
Zizka is the younger son of politician Walburga Zizka (Christian Democratic Union of Germany) and Cyril Zizka, of Czech descendant. Initially trained as an art restorer, Zizka studied graphics, design and visual communication at the Hochschule für Gestaltung Offenbach in 1983. He also attended the Städelschule in Frankfurt and studied under Bruce McLean, among others.

In 1989, together with Achim Heine and Michael Lenz, Zizka founded the design company Heine/Lenz/Zizka. In the early 1990s, Zizka and Olaf Rahlwes explored the interface between art and design with their MEMORY conceptual art exhibitions.

He then created The Virtual Minefield, a floor-based installation spanning art and design. Zizka won the gold award from the European Art Directors Club for The Virtual Minefield. It was shown at the Kunsthal Rotterdam, the Foreign Office in Berlin and the Hygiene Museum Dresden among others.

In 2008, Zizka won the design competition for the Kiel Week corporate design, following the likes of Wim Crouwel (1998), Fons Hickmann (2002), and Klaus Hesse (2006).

In 2010 he started an art project in Burundi about the weapons of the Hutu Tutsi conflict. In 2011, he received the fellowship of the Deutsche Akademie Rom Villa Massimo.

Zizka writes about design for the Swiss Bilanz magazine and is a freelance curator for the Museum für angewandte Kunst Frankfurt.

Zizka works and lives in Frankfurt am Main und Berlin.

== Curated exhibitions ==
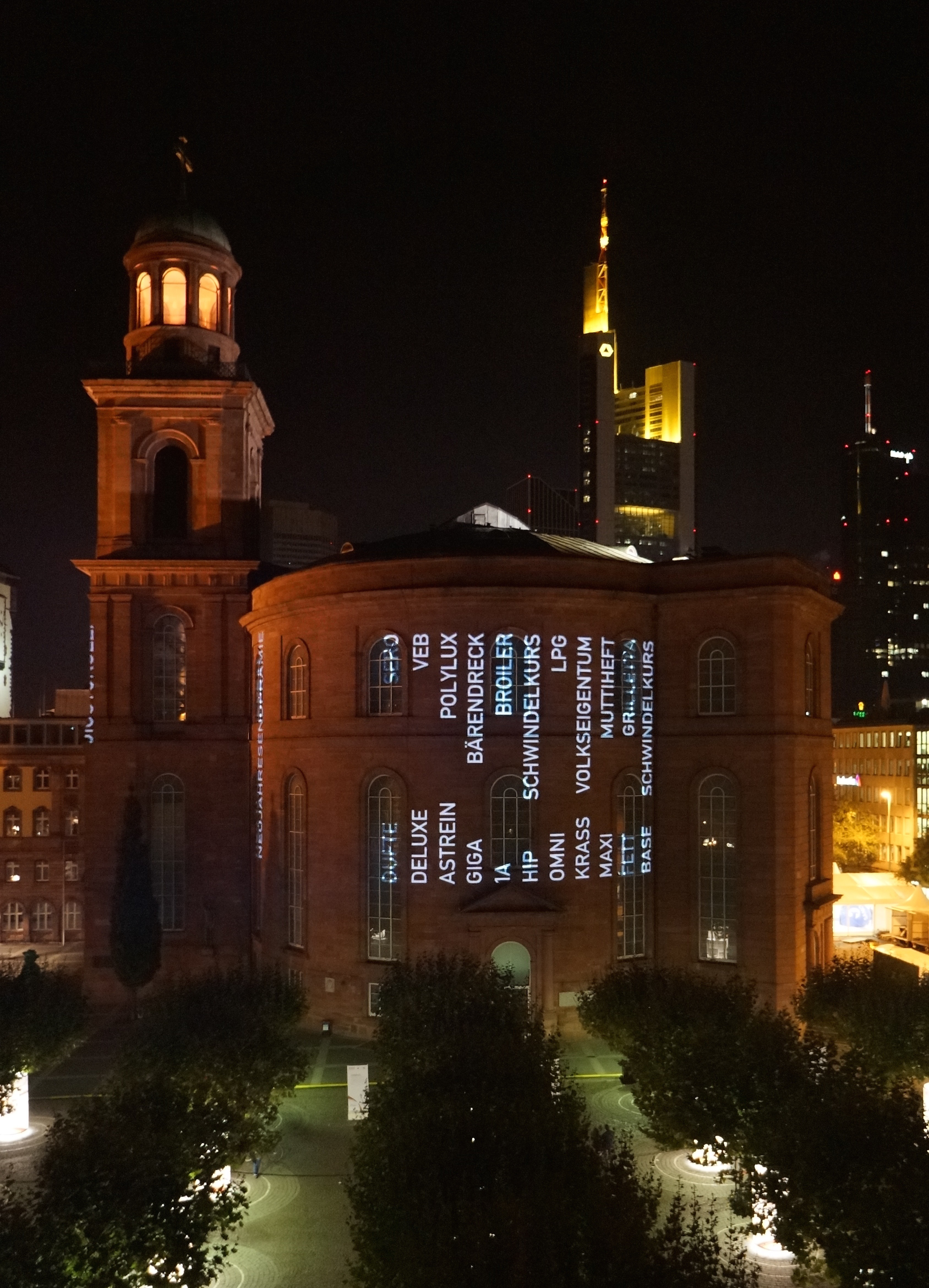
celebrations of 25 years German reunification, typographic Installation of Peter Zizka on the St. Paul's Church, Frankfurt

2016

- »Stefan Sagmeister: The Happy Show«, Museum für angewandte Kunst Frankfurt, Frankfurt. This exhibition was originally organized by the Institute of Contemporary Art, Philadelphia and curated by Claudia Gould.
- »New Everything! A Century of New Typography and New Graphic Design in Frankfurt am Main«, together with Prof. Dr. Klaus Klemp, Prof. em. Friedrich Friedl and Matthias Wagner K, Museum für angewandte Kunst Frankfurt, Frankfurt.

== Selected solo and group exhibitions ==
1997

- Memory with Olaf Rahlwes, Kunst Halle St. Gallen, St. Gallen.
  (Further exhibitions of the Memory-Group from 1985-1994 include Fisherman's Studios, London, Kunstraum Konstantin Adamopulos, Frankfurt, Galerie AK, Hans Sworowski, Frankfurt, Galerie Lukas & Hoffmann, Berlin, Galerie Single 74, Amsterdam, Galerie Vorsetzen, Hamburg und Galerie Schneider, Konstanz.)

2004

- The virtual Minefield, Auswärtiges Amt, Lichthof, Berlin

2005

- Lew Kopelew Forum, Cologne
- De soldaat die nooit slaapt, Kunsthal, Rotterdam
- The virtual Minefield, Stadthalle (Freiburg im Breisgau), Freiburg
- The virtual Minefield, Schauspiel Frankfurt, Frankfurt

2009

- War and Medicine, German Hygiene Museum, Dresden

2011

- Festa del‘ estate, German Academy Rome Villa Massimo, Rome
- Symbiosis – 1.5 Tons of Global Entanglement, ZKM Center for Art and Media Karlsruhe, Karlsruhe

2012

- Abwehr. Überlebensstrategien in Natur, Wirtschaft, Politik und Alltag, Stiftung Charles und Agnes Vögele, Zürich-Pfäffikon
- Night of the Villa Massimo, Martin-Gropius-Bau, Berlin

2013

- For a mine-free world, United Nations, Main Gallery, New York
- Open View, Nassauischer Kunstverein, Wiesbaden
- Symbiosis - 1,5 Tonnen globale Verwicklung, Kunsthalle E-werk, Freiburg

2015

- Favourites. Favourite pieces from the private collections of Beckers and Landau, Galerie Braubachstrasse9, Frankfurt
- Secret Compartments, Museum für angewandte Kunst Frankfurt, Frankfurt

2016

- Under Arms. Fire & Forget 2, curated by Ellen Blumstein, Dr. Daniel Tyradellis und Matthias Wagner K, Museum für angewandte Kunst Frankfurt, Frankfurt

== Works ==
- MEMORY 1-24
- Der Frankfurter Bankstuhlgang (performance)
- Bois de Boulogne (fotoinstallation)
- The Virtual Minefield (installation)
- IPRAY (2006)
- Outliner (2008, installation)
- Symbiosis/Burundi (2010/11, installation) constructed from weapons which have been rendered unusable

== Bibliography ==
- Memory 30 – a book, Walther König: Frankfurt
- ROGUE, Konstantin Adamopoulos: MEMORY, a sign of intelligence
- Page Designmagazin 10/95 a perfect triangle, Page Verlag
- FrancoForte, Verlag: Schaden u. Schaden ISBN 3-932187-31-8
- Horizont 18/2002 colors of taste
- Horizont 23/2002 Das Werkzeug als Auge sensibler Stars
- Welt am Sonntag, 24. November 2002 Objektive Schönheit
- TAZ, 2. Dezember 2004 Der falsche Tritt kann tödlich sein
- Gestalte / Create – Design Medien Kunst, Hrsg. v. Bernd Kracke 2007, HFG of–main, Wir die Kommunikationannimateure ISBN 3-89986-092-6
- Hundert t-Variationen, editor Jan Teunen, Verlag Hermann Schmidt Mainz, ISBN 3-87439-544-8
- form 213, Hasta la Vista Baby!, Verlag Form ISBN 3-936560-50-1
- Padamm, Verlag otto Lembeck, die Zweiweltenoper, ISBN 978-3-87476-520-6
- Design Walk, Psyrri, Greek Graphic Designers Association
- Page Designmagzine 06/07 Wertvolles Dazwischen, Page Verlag
- Form 219/2008 "Peter Zizkas Graphic blows" ISBN 3-7643-8615-0
- Beef 03/2008 (interview) Designer geben den Takt vor ISSN 1866-1890
- Lookbook 2.0 2009 Simple, Multiple
- Designing the Brand Experience, ISBN 981-245-732-1
- Revision 1/2009 "Design-lotto easy going"
- Egokollektiv. Peter Zizka«, edited by Anna Duque y González and Matthias Wagner K, Verlag der Buchhandlung Walther König, Köln 2018, ISBN 978-3-96098-364-4.
