= Bavier =

Bavier is a surname. Notable people with the surname include:

- Frances Bavier (1902-1989), American actress
- Johann Baptista Bavier (1795-1856), Swiss politician
- Simeon Bavier (1825-1896), Swiss politician

== See also ==
- Baviera
