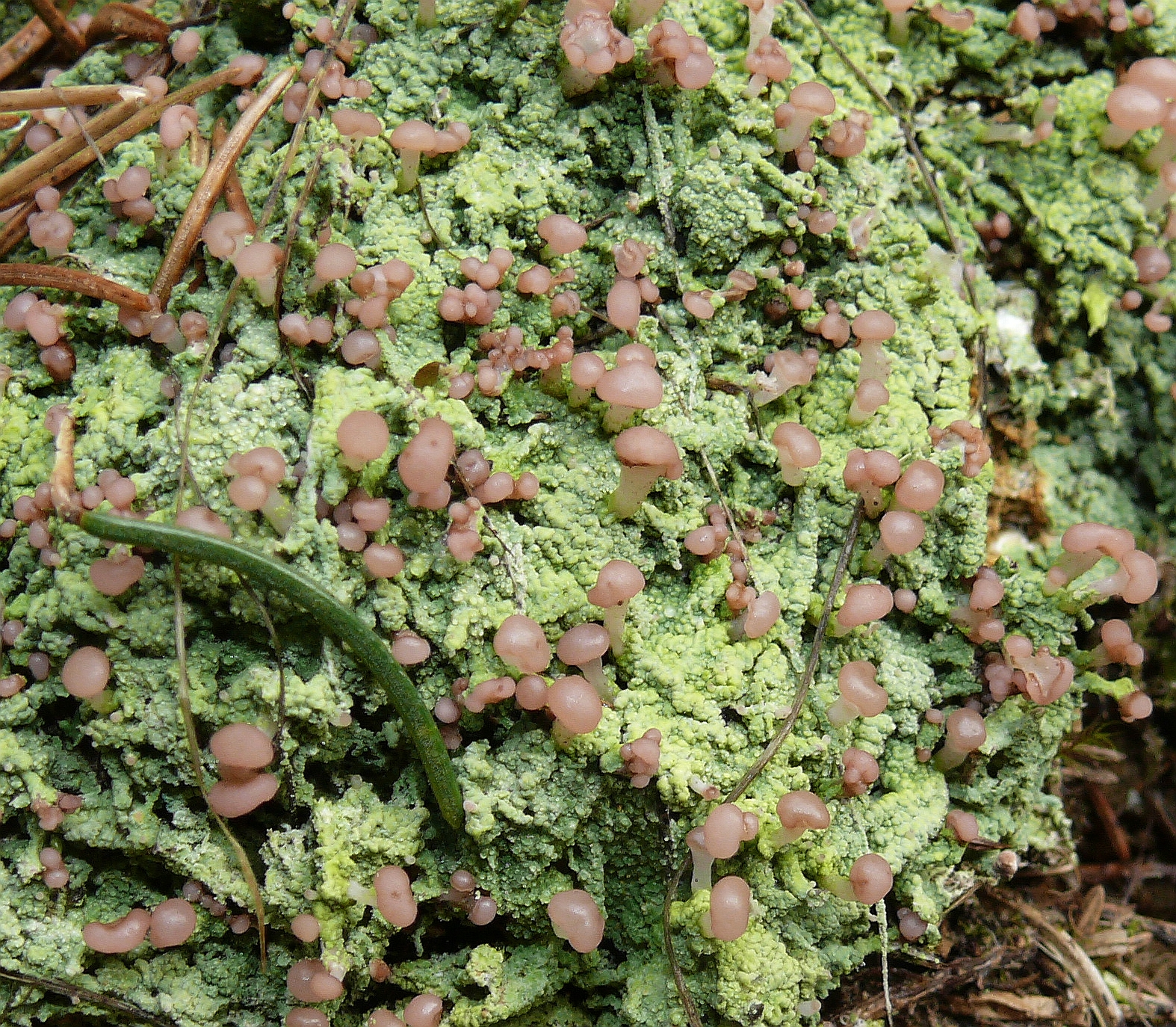

Conservation status
- Secure (NatureServe)

Scientific classification
- Kingdom: Fungi
- Division: Ascomycota
- Class: Lecanoromycetes
- Order: Baeomycetales
- Family: Baeomycetaceae
- Genus: Baeomyces
- Species: B. rufus

Binomial name
- Baeomyces rufus (Huds.) Rebent. (1804)

Synonyms
- Lichen rufus Huds. (1762); Sphyridium byssoides

= Baeomyces rufus =

Species of lichen

Baeomyces rufus, commonly known as the brown beret lichen, is a fruticose lichen belonging to the cap lichen family, Baeomycetaceae. The species was first described by J.F Rebentisch in 1804. Like other lichens, it is a symbiosis between a fungus and an alga.

== Taxonomy ==
William Hudson described this species as Lichen rufus in 1762.

The similar-appearing lichen D. baeomyces was formerly identified as Baeomyces roseus; it was not until 1997 that a study by Soili Stenroos and Paula DePriest used DNA sequencing to establish that the species now called Dibaeis baeomyces did not belong to the genus Baeomyces. B. rufus was the lichen representing genus Baeomyces whose DNA was sequenced for comparison with B. roseus/D. baeomyces.

== Description ==
B. rufus is characterized by bulbous apothecia which may vary from reddish brown to orange to pink, and which become translucent when wet; they may reach a maximum diameter of 2 mm, atop stalks no taller than 6 mm. The thallus may be green, grey or greenish-grey, and may have a brownish tinge. Unlike other Baeomyces species, B. rufus's margins are unlobed.

=== Similar species ===
B. rufus can be confused with Dibaeis baeomyces, particularly when the former's fruiting bodies are more pink than brown, but the two can be distinguished by morphological differences such as D. baeomyces's larger bulbs or the translucent appearance of B. rufus's apothecia when wet, and by differences in habit, as D. baeomyces thrives in full sun whereas B. rufus avoids it. With a light microscope, B. rufus can easily be distinguished by its apothecial stalks, as D. baeomyces has apothecia directly on the thallus, without a stalk.

== Distribution and habitat ==
This is the most common of the beret or cap lichens. It is found in circumpolar North America, Asia, and Europe; it occurs as far south as Turkey. Its southern ranges are limited to mountainous areas. Typical habitats of B. rufus are temperate pine forests, with moist sites and disturbed ground being particularly preferred. Specimens may grow directly on soil or leaf litter, or on tree bark or stones. Shaded locations are preferred to those that receive direct sunlight.

== Varieties ==
Named varieties of B. rufus include:

- B. r. var. callianthus (meaning: having beautiful flowers)
- B. r. var. carneofulvescens
- B. r. var. chilensis (meaning: from the country Chile)
- B. r. var. monstrosus (meaning: abnormal, enormous, malformed)
- B. r. var. piceicola
- B. r. var. prostii
