= Anton Peter Müeller =

German-Brazilian economist and author (1948–2026)

Prof.Dr. Antony Peter Müeller
- Anton Peter Müeller
- Born: 22 February 1948 (age 78); Baviera,Germany
- Citizenship: German
- Children: Ana Paula Campillo Müller; Peter Campillo Müeller

Academic background
- Education: University of Erlangen–Nuremberg B.A in Economics, University of Erlangen–Nuremberg M.A. in Economics; University of Erlangen–Nuremberg PhD in Economics
- Doctoral advisor: Prof Dr.Helmut Winterstein
- Scientific career
- Thesis: Sozialpolitik und Wirtschaftsordnung zur Rolle d. sozialen Komponente in d. oeffentlichen Finanzwirtschaft im Lichte alternativer ordnungspolitischer Konzeptionen
- Website: Information at IDEAS / RePEc

Antony Peter Mueller (22 February 1948 – 24 May 2026) was a German-born economist, university professor, and writer associated with the Austrian School of Economics and libertarianism .

== Early life and education ==
Mueller was born in Bavaria, West Germany, on 22 February 1948. He studied economics, law, political science, and philosophy at the University of Erlangen-Nuremberg (FAU), where he earned his doctorate (*summa cum laude*) in economics and later obtained his habilitation (*venia legendi*). In 1978, he worked as a researcher at the Center for the Study of Public Choice in Virginia, studying under Nobel laureate James M. Buchanan. During 1989–1990, he served as a Fulbright Scholar in the United States and as a visiting professor at Radford University.

== Academic and professional career ==
Mueller pursued an international academic career, holding teaching and research positions in Europe, the United States, and Latin America. He served as a professor of economics at the Federal University of Sergipe (UFS) in Brazil from 2008 until his death. He was an adjunct scholar at the Ludwig von Mises Institute in the United States and a senior fellow/founding member of the Mises Institute Brazil, where he taught at the Mises Academy. Additionally, he worked as a Senior Fellow for the American Institute for Economic Research (AIER) and founded *The Continental Economics Institute* (CEI).

== Economic thought ==
Mueller's academic work focused on monetary economics, international finance, business cycle theory, and the critique of state interventionism. Over time, his intellectual stance evolved from classical liberalism toward anarcho-capitalism and an uncompromising defense of private property, free markets, and individual liberty. He frequently wrote essays and commentaries criticizing central banking, fiat currency systems, and modern technocratic global governance models.

== Selected publications ==
- Mueller, Antony P. (2019). A Primer on Austrian Macroeconomics. Palgrave Studies in Austrian Economics. Palgrave Macmillan.
- Mueller, Antony P. (2021). Capitalismo, Socialismo e Anarquia: Rumo a uma Ordem Social além do Estado e da Política.

== Death ==
Mueller died in Aracaju, Brazil, on 24 May 2026, at the age of 78. His passing was widely mourned by international libertarian and Austrian School academic circles.
