= Virtual minefield =

The Virtual Minefield is an art installation by conceptual artist Peter Zizka in collaboration with relief organisation Medico International, one of the participants in the International Campaign to Ban Landmines, to draw attention to the threat of land mines and unexploded ordnance in many countries.

Zizka created a floor-based art installation to show photographic images of land mines. Segments of the installation were available to purchase to raise money for Medico International's landmine victim fund. Proceeds went towards financing work to clear minefields, psychological and physical rehabilitation measures for land mine victims and education programmes Medico's project regions in Angola, Afghanistan, Cambodia and El Salvador.

The Virtual Minefield received the Gold Award from the jury of ADC Deutschland and ADC Europe.

== Notable exhibitions ==
- Kunsthal Rotterdam
- Schauspiel Frankfurt
- Kulturgeschichtliches Museum Osnabrück
- Deutsches Hygiene-Museum Dresden/Welcome Collection
