= Wolfgang Schivelbusch =

German historian (1941–2023)

- Born: 26 November 1941; Berlin, German Reich
- Died: 26 March 2023 (aged 81); Berlin, Federal Republic of Germany
- Occupations: Independent scholar, historian, writer
- Employer: Wiesbadener Kurier
- Spouse: Helma von Kieseritzky
- Awards: Deutscher Sachbuchpreis; Heinrich Mann Prize

Academic background
- Education: Goethe University Frankfurt
- Alma mater: Free University of Berlin
- Thesis: (1972)
- Doctoral advisor: Hans Mayer
- Influences: Norbert Elias

Academic work
- Discipline: Cultural studies

Wolfgang Schivelbusch (26 November 1941 – 26 March 2023) was a German scholar of cultural studies, historian, and author.

== Early life ==
Wolfgang Schivelbusch was born on 26 November 1941 in Berlin. He studied literature, sociology, and philosophy. He lived in New York from 1973 to 2014, before relocating to Berlin.

== Career ==
Schivelbusch was an independent scholar, not affiliated with any academic institution. He studied the history of mentalities, perception and cultural history more broadly. In 2003, he was awarded the Heinrich Mann Prize of the Academy of Arts in Berlin. He has cited Norbert Elias as one of his main influences and inspirations.

== The Railway Journey ==
Schivelbusch's 1977 book, Geschichte der Eisenbahnreise: Zur Industrialisierung von Raum und Zeit im 19. Jahrhundert, was published in English as The Railway Journey: The Industrialization of Time and Space in the Nineteenth Century in 1986 and updated with a new preface in 2014. Per the publisher, "Schivelbusch discusses the ways in which our perceptions of distance, time, autonomy, speed, and risk were altered by railway travel." In other words, Schivelbusch describes how the railroad not only transformed the natural landscape but also our very perceptual experience of nature itself.

Schivelbusch notes that the “annihilation of space and time” was the early nineteenth-century characterization of the effect of railroad travel, due to the speed the new means of transportation was able to achieve. The diminished time it took to cross the distance between two spatial locations (such as two cities) by railway meant that these locations no longer seemed so distant, even though the distance between them remained unaltered. Additionally, as the railroad network expanded and its reach lengthened, ever more distant places became newly and widely accessible. Thus, Schivelbusch describes two contradictory sides of the same process:

[O]n the one hand, the railroad opened up new spaces that were not as easily accessible before; on the other, it did so by destroying space, namely the space between points. That in-between, or travel space, which it was possible to 'savor' while using the slow, work-intensive eotechnical form of transport, disappeared on the railroads. The railroad knows only points of departure and destination.

The denizens of the nineteenth century, who were used to traveling by stagecoach or horseback (and consequently had time to "savor" their journey and contemplate the surrounding landscape), suddenly found themselves remarkably dissociated from their surroundings while sitting in a railcar. The speed of the train precluded the ability to focus on aspects of the landscape around them for any great length of time, and many early passengers often became physically distressed or even ill as a result of their exposure to the rapid change of impressions while looking out the railcar window. What Schivelbusch terms the “panoramic gaze”—the ability to look out into the distance and enjoy the passing landscape—had at first to be gradually developed. The modes of perception formed by traditional travel were thus thrown into crisis by the need for an entirely new perceptual posture, one that could enable enjoyment or at least tolerance of the new landscape created by the railroad. Such a shift in perception had subtle ramifications in many sectors: for instance, book publishers enjoyed an increased demand for reading material by train travelers, as something they could easily and at length give their attention to and focus their eyes on.

== Works ==
- Rückzug. Geschichten eines Tabus. (Retreat. Histories of a taboo). Carl Hanser Verlag, München (2019)
- Das verzehrende Leben der Dinge. Versuch über die Konsumtion. (The Consuming Life of Things). Carl Hanser Verlag, München (2015)
- Three New Deals: Reflections on Roosevelt's America, Mussolini's Italy, and Hitler's Germany, 1933–1939 (2006)
- Entfernte Verwandtschaft: Faschismus, Nationalsozialismus, New Deal 1933 – 1939 (Distant Relationship: Fascism, National Socialism, New Deal 1933–1939). Carl Hanser Verlag, München (2005)
- Die Kultur der Niederlage: Der amerikanische Süden 1865, Frankreich 1871, Deutschland 1918. (The Culture of Defeat: The American South 1865, France 1871, Germany 1918) Fest, Berlin (2001)
- In a Cold Crater: Cultural and Intellectual Life in Berlin, 1945–1948. University of California Press, Berkeley (1998)
- Eine Ruine im Krieg der Geister. (A Ruin in the War of Ghosts) Fischer-Taschenbuch-Verl., Frankfurt (1993)
- Licht, Schein und Wahn: Auftritte der elektrischen Beleuchtung im 20. Jahrhundert. (Light, Shine and Delusion: Scenes of Electric Illumination in the 20th Century) Ernst, Berlin (1992)
- Die Bibliothek von Löwen. Eine Episode aus der Zeit der Weltkriege. (The Library of Leuven : an episode from the time of the World Wars) München 1988
- Eine wilhelminische Oper. (A Wilhelmine Opera) Insel, Frankfurt (1985)
- Lichtblicke: Zur Geschichte der künstlichen Helligkeit im 19. Jahrhundert. (English translation published as Disenchanted Night: The Industrialization of Light in the Nineteenth Century by University of California Press 1995) Hanser, München/Wien (1983)
- Das Paradies, der Geschmack und die Vernunft: Eine Geschichte der Genussmittel. (English translation published as Tastes of Paradise by Pantheon 1992) Hanser, München/Wien (1980)
- Geschichte der Eisenbahnreise: Zur Industrialisierung von Raum und Zeit im 19. Jahrhundert. (English translation published as The Railway Journey by Urizen 1979 and University of California Press 1986) Hanser
- "The Industrialized Traveller". Telos 21 (Fall 1974). New York: Telos Press.

== Awards ==
- 2003 Heinrich Mann Prize
- 2013 Lessing Prize of the Free and Hanseatic City of Hamburg
