= Hugo Eberhardt =

German architect

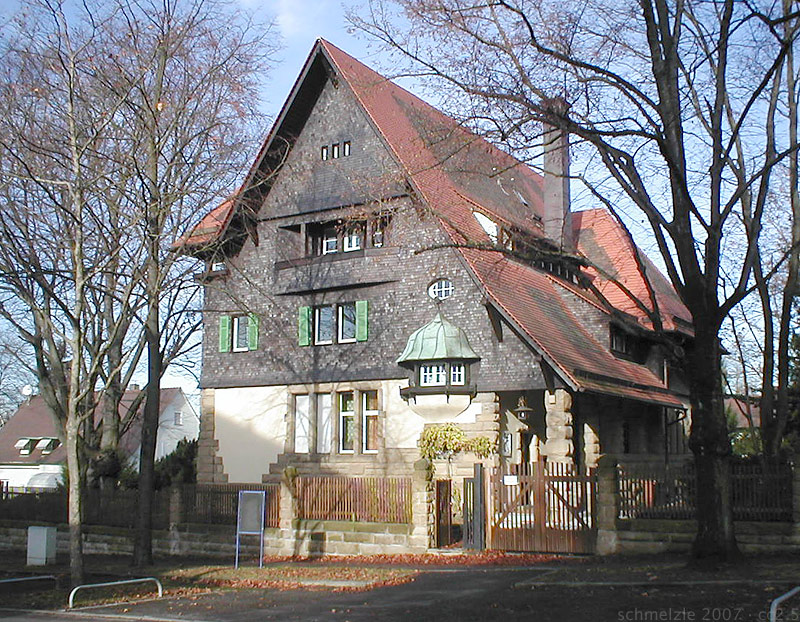
Pielenz Mansion in Heilbronn

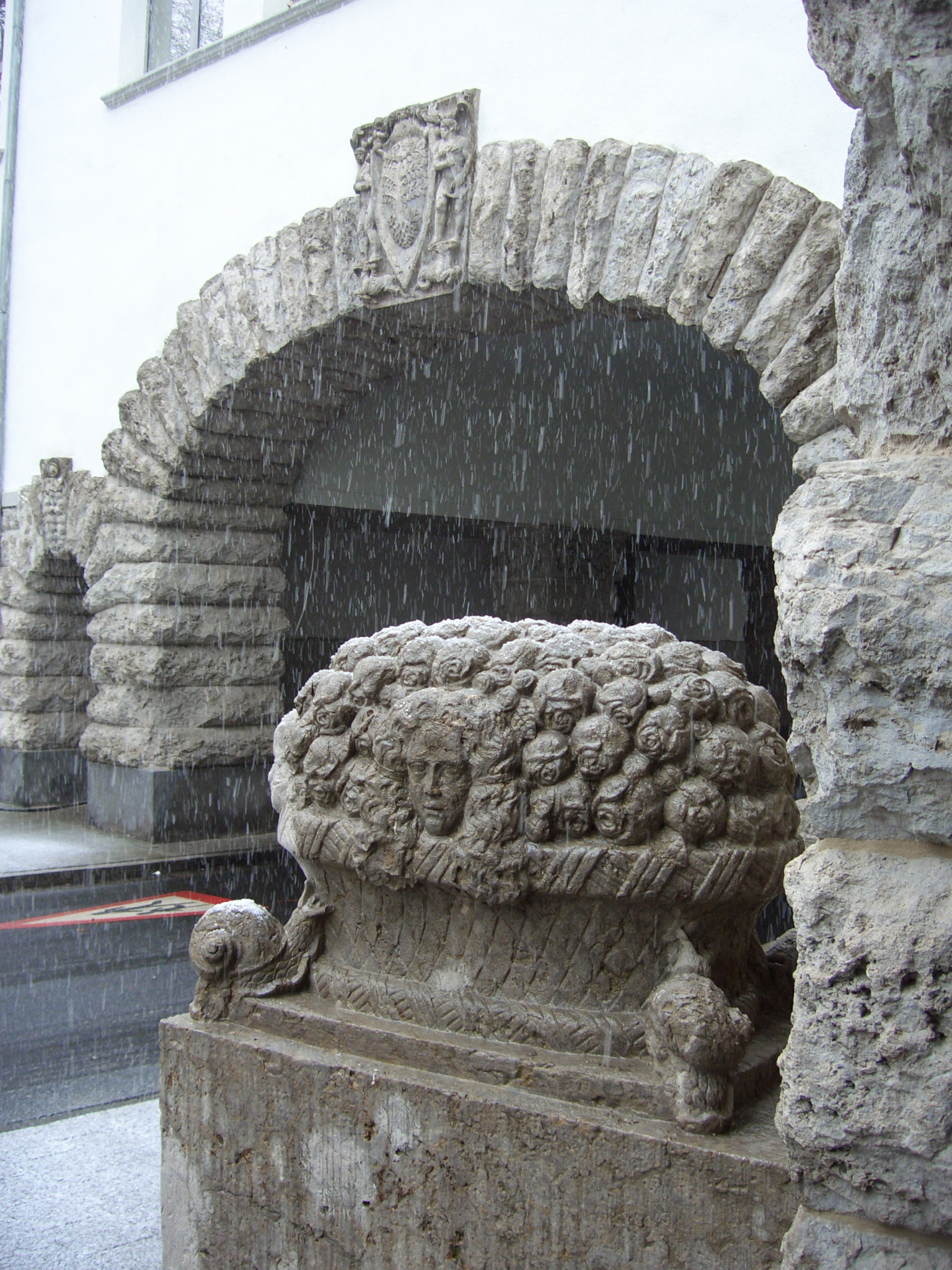
Detail on the building of HfG Offenbach

Hugo Eberhardt (2 May 1874, Furtwangen im Schwarzwald − 8 April 1959) was a German architect.

== Biography ==
Eberhardt started his career as a ship interior architect for Norddeutscher Lloyd, After working in Kos as an archeologist for a German ministry and as an inspector of construction in Frankfurt he became manager of the School of Technology and Design (today HfG Offenbach design school) in Offenbach in 1907. Ten years later he founded the German Leather Museum.

Most buildings Eberhardt designed were public buildings or luxurious mansions. In Offenbach survived three buildings: the office building of the Heyne factory, the AOK insurance and the main building of the HfG Offenbach.
