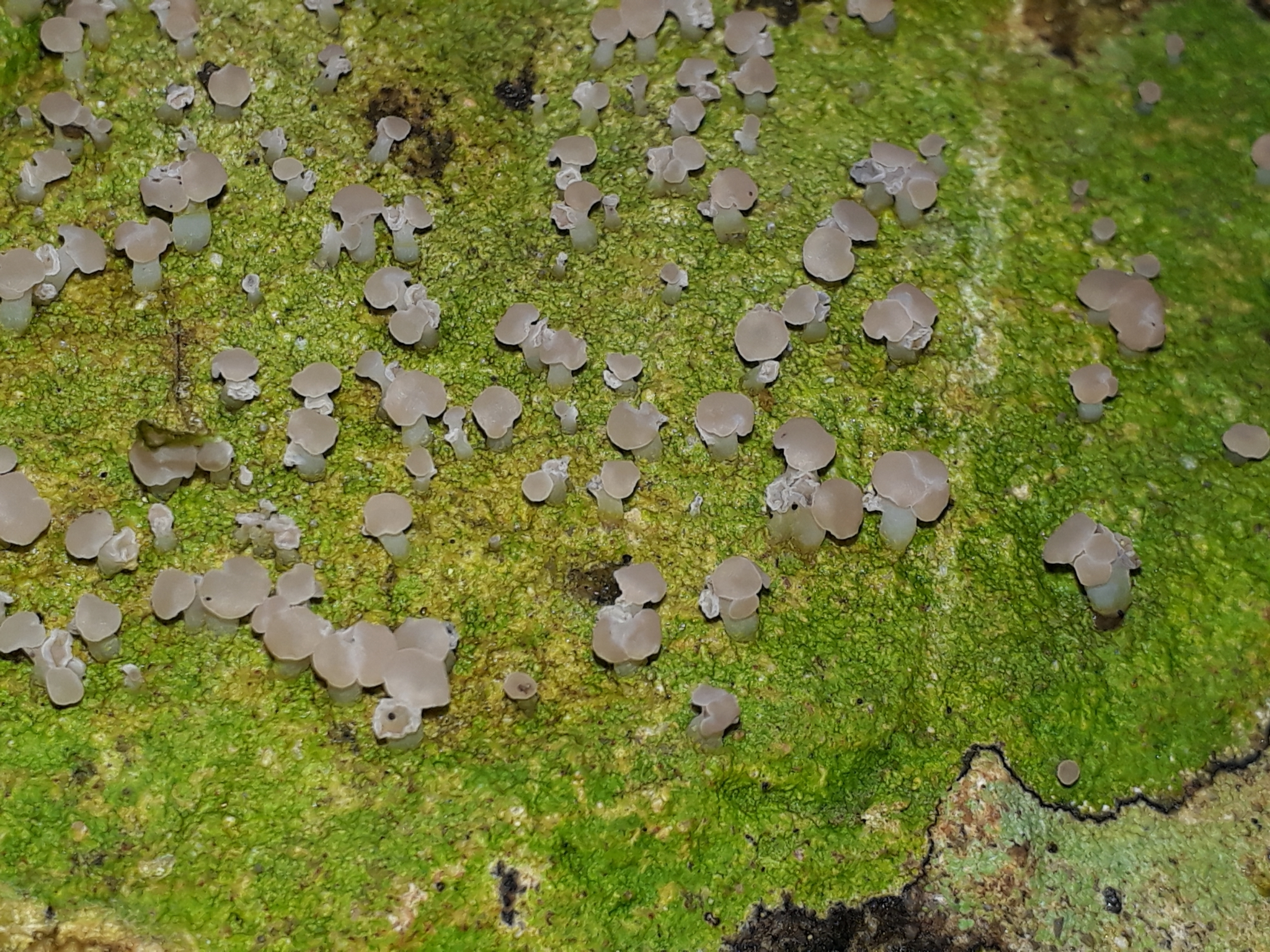

Scientific classification
- Kingdom: Fungi
- Division: Ascomycota
- Class: Lecanoromycetes
- Order: Baeomycetales
- Family: Baeomycetaceae
- Genus: Baeomyces
- Species: B. heteromorphus

Binomial name
- Baeomyces heteromorphus Nyl. ex C.Bab. & Mitt. (1859)

Synonyms
- Tubercularia heteromorpha (Nyl. ex C.Bab. & Mitt.) Kuntze (1891)

= Baeomyces heteromorphus =

Species of lichen

Baeomyces heteromorphus is a species of terricolous (ground-dwelling) lichen in the family Baeomycetaceae. It has an Australasian distribution. Characteristics of the lichen include its greenish-grey thallus, the pink to brownish discs of its apothecia (fruiting bodies), translucent spores lacking internal partitions (septa), and the presence of the secondary metabolites (lichen products) norstictic acid and connorstictic acid.

== Taxonomy ==
The lichen was first described by William Nylander. Churchill Babington and William Mitten published it validly in Joseph Dalton Hooker's 1860 work Flora Tasmaniae, a description of the plants and cryptogams discovered in Tasmania during the Ross expedition. In 1896, Hellbom proposed the form rubens, and in 1937, Veli Räsänen suggested the variety corymbosus.

== Description ==
Baeomyces heteromorphus is a species of lichen with a diverse and intricate structure, primarily found forming wide, expansive patches that can exceed 50 cm in width. The lichen is characterised by its crustose thallus, which is the main body of the lichen, with a smooth, verruculose (wart-like), to areolate-subsquamulose (cracked to slightly scaly) texture. Its colour ranges from pale greyish white to greenish grey, and it often turns pale pinkish grey when stored. The thallus is relatively thick, reaching up to approximately 700 μm, and spreads without a defined boundary, as it lacks a prothallus (the initial growth phase of lichens).

Baeomyces heteromorphus does not produce soredia or isidia, which are common structures for asexual reproduction in many lichens. Instead, it occasionally develops schizidia (fragmented pieces of the thallus), but these are typically observed only in damaged specimens.

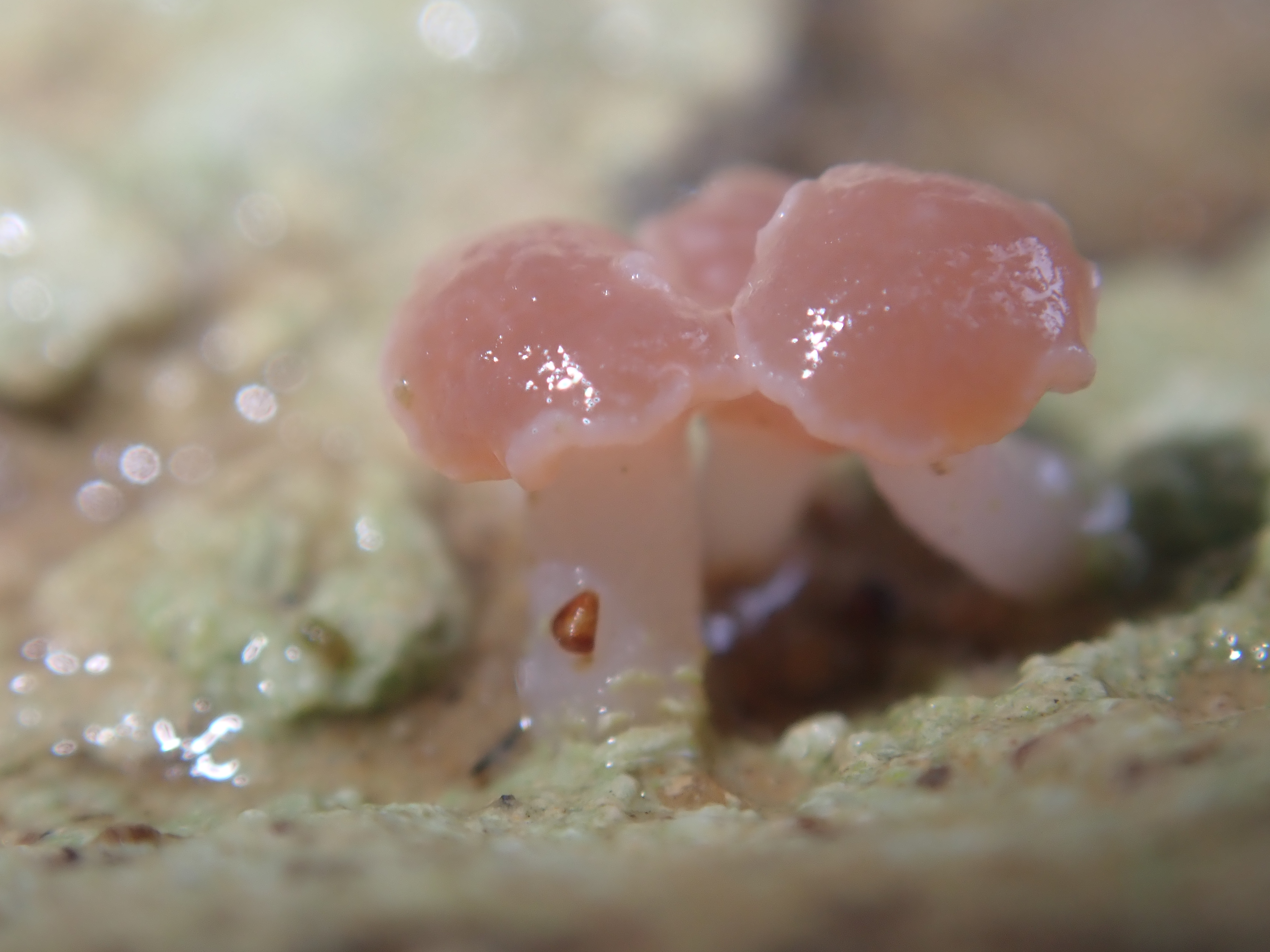
Fruiting bodies are often distinctly stalked, appearing either singly or in clusters.

The apothecia (fruiting bodies) of this lichen are small, ranging from 0.1 to 3 mm in diameter. They can be round, slightly raised (subsessile), or more frequently, distinctly stalked, appearing either singly or in clustered formations that resemble branches or racemes. The stalks of these apothecia can grow up to 7 mm tall and may be smooth or have longitudinal grooves, with some parts near the base appearing gnarled due to thalline tissue (lichen tissue). The colour of the apothecial disc varies from pale greyish pink to reddish brown, with its shape changing from persistently concave to flat, or even wavy to convex as it ages. The surrounding rim (proper exciple) is paler than the disc and may become less visible in older apothecia.

Internally, the lichen has a hypothecium (bottom layer beneath the hymenium in apothecia) ranging from clear to pale yellowish, underlain by a thick layer of loosely interwoven fungal filaments. The hymenium (the fertile, spore-bearing layer) itself is clear and is topped by a yellow-brown layer that dissolves in potassium hydroxide (K). The asci (spore-containing structures) measure 70–95 by 5–8 μm, with paraphyses (sterile filaments among the asci) being 1.5–2 μm thick. Ascospores, the reproductive spores, vary in size from (7–)8.5 to 13(–15) by 3 to 5 μm. Pycnidia, which are asexual reproductive structures, were not observed in this species.

Chemically, Baeomyces heteromorphus contains norstictic and connorstictic acids, with occasional traces of other compounds. Testing reveals distinct reactions: the thallus turns yellow-red when treated with a solution of potassium hydroxide (K+), no change with calcium hypochlorite (KC−) and bleach (C−), orange with para-phenylenediamine (P+), and no fluorescence under ultraviolet light (UV−).

=== Similar species ===
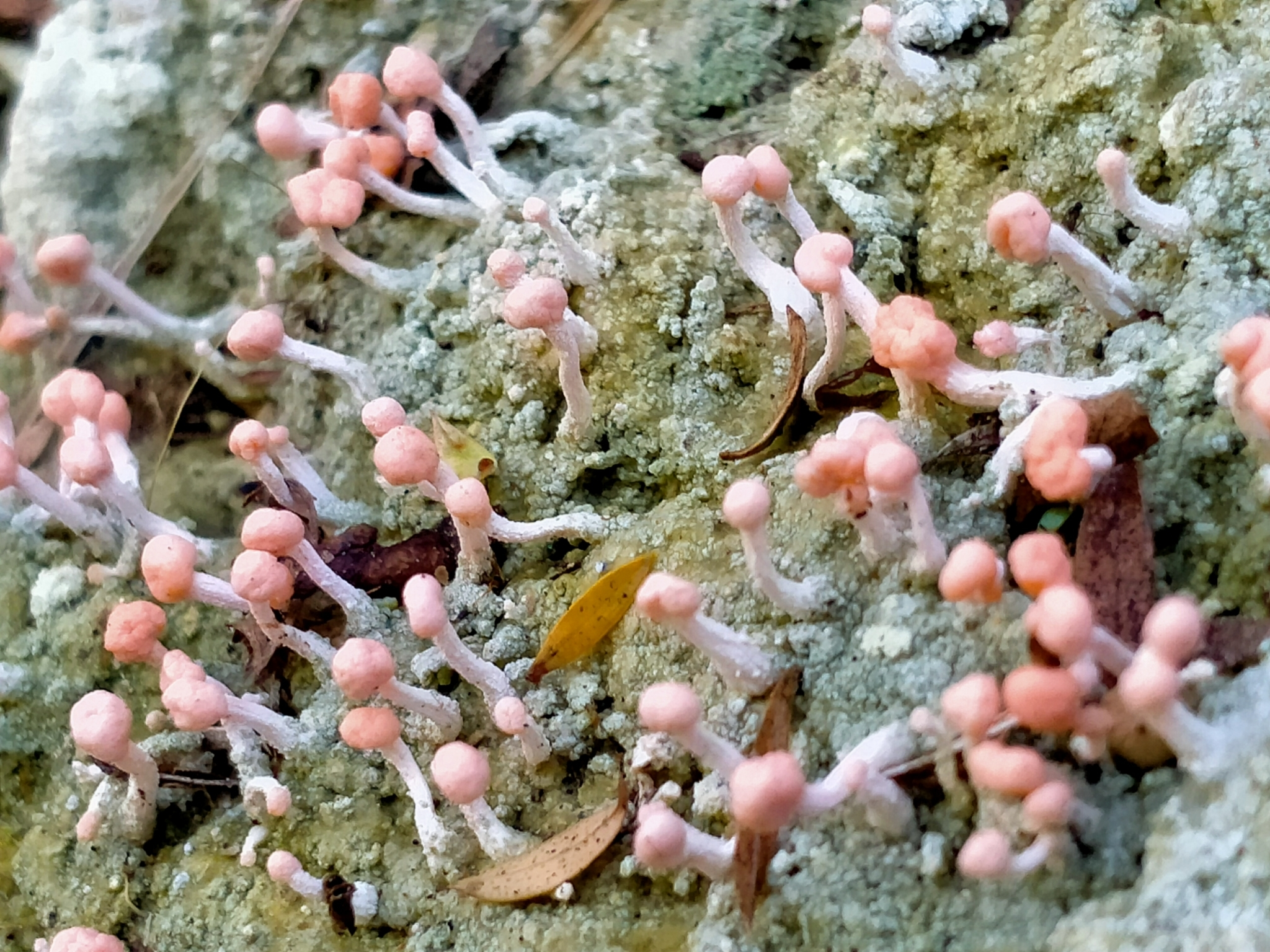
Dibaeis arcuata is a lookalike.

The frequently co-occurring yet distinct species, Dibaeis arcuata, can be readily differentiated from Baeomyces heteromorphus by its lighter, greyish white thallus that produces soredia and contains baeomycesic and squamatic acids. Moreover, Dibaeis arcuata is notable for its bright pink, club-shaped apothecia that lack a defined margin and are borne on a smooth, ungrooved stalk.

== Habitat and distribution ==
Baeomyces heteromorphus has a broad geographical range, growing on a variety of substrates including soil, peat, stones, and wood. Its presence is particularly noted in regions with high rainfall, as well as in locally moist microhabitats, spanning from lowland areas to alpine elevations. This species plays a role in ecological succession, often being among the first to colonise and stabilise newly exposed earth, such as areas disturbed by road construction, along pathways, or around the root mounds of upturned stumps.

The species is commonly found across mainland Australia and New Zealand. On Tasmania's Mount Wellington, it occurs in three vegetations zones: in woodlands with mixed Eucalyptus coccifera and Eucalytpus urnigera stands; in wet sclerophyll forests dominated by Eucalyptus delegatensis; and in these forests dominated by Eucalyptus obliqua. Baeomyces heteromorphus also occurs in New Guinea, and Fiji. It has also been recorded from Kaikōura Island. It also extends its habitat to the subantarctic region, with documented populations on Macquarie Island.

== Species interactions ==
Baeomyces heteromorphus is often subject to parasitism by lichenicolous (lichen-dwelling) fungus species including Arthroraphis grisea and Dactylospora athallina. These fungi are identifiable by their small, black, lecideine-type apothecia.
