= Hochschule für Gestaltung =

Hochschule für Gestaltung (HfG, lit. "college for design") denotes certain design or art schools in Germany, and may refer to:

- Hochschule für Gestaltung Ulm (Ulm School of Design), founded in 1953 and closed in 1968
- Kunsthochschule Berlin-Weißensee
- Hochschule für Gestaltung Offenbach am Main (since 1970)
- Hochschule für Gestaltung Schwäbisch Gmünd (since 1971)
- Hochschule für Gestaltung Schwäbisch Hall (2000–2013)
- Hochschule für Gestaltung und Kunst Basel
- Hochschule für Gestaltung und Kunst Zürich
- Staatliche Hochschule für Gestaltung Karlsruhe (Karlsruhe University of Arts and Design)
