= Lessing Prize of the Free and Hanseatic City of Hamburg =

German culture award

The Lessing Prize of the Free and Hanseatic City of Hamburg was established in 1929 on the occasion of the 200th anniversary of the birth of the poet Gotthold Ephraim Lessing and was awarded for the first time in 1930. Since 1977, the prize has been awarded every four years. The prize money was €10,000; in 2025, the prize money is €20,000. A Lessing Prize scholarship is endowed with further €10,000.

== Recipients ==
- 1930 Friedrich Gundolf
- 1934 Friedrich Griese and Konrad Beste
- 1938 Andreas Heusler
- 1942 Hermann Claudius
- 1944 Fritz Schumacher
- 1947 Rudolf Alexander Schröder
- 1950 Ernst Robert Curtius
- 1953 Wilhelm Lehmann and Albrecht Goes
- 1956 Hans Henny Jahnn
- 1959 Hannah Arendt
- 1962 Werner Haftmann
- 1965 Peter Weiß
- 1968 Walter Jens
- 1971 Max Horkheimer
- 1974 Gustav Heinemann
- 1977 Jean Améry
- 1981 Rolf Hochhuth and Ágnes Heller
- 1985 Hartmut von Hentig
- 1989 Alexander Kluge
- 1993 Raymond Klibansky
- 1997 Jan Philipp Reemtsma
- 2001 Botho Strauß
- 2005 Karl Schlögel
- 2009 Klaus Harpprecht
- 2013 Wolfgang Schivelbusch
- 2017 Juliane Rebentisch
- 2021 Uwe Timm
- 2025 Judith Schalansky

== Related awards ==
- Lessing Prize of the Free State of Saxony
