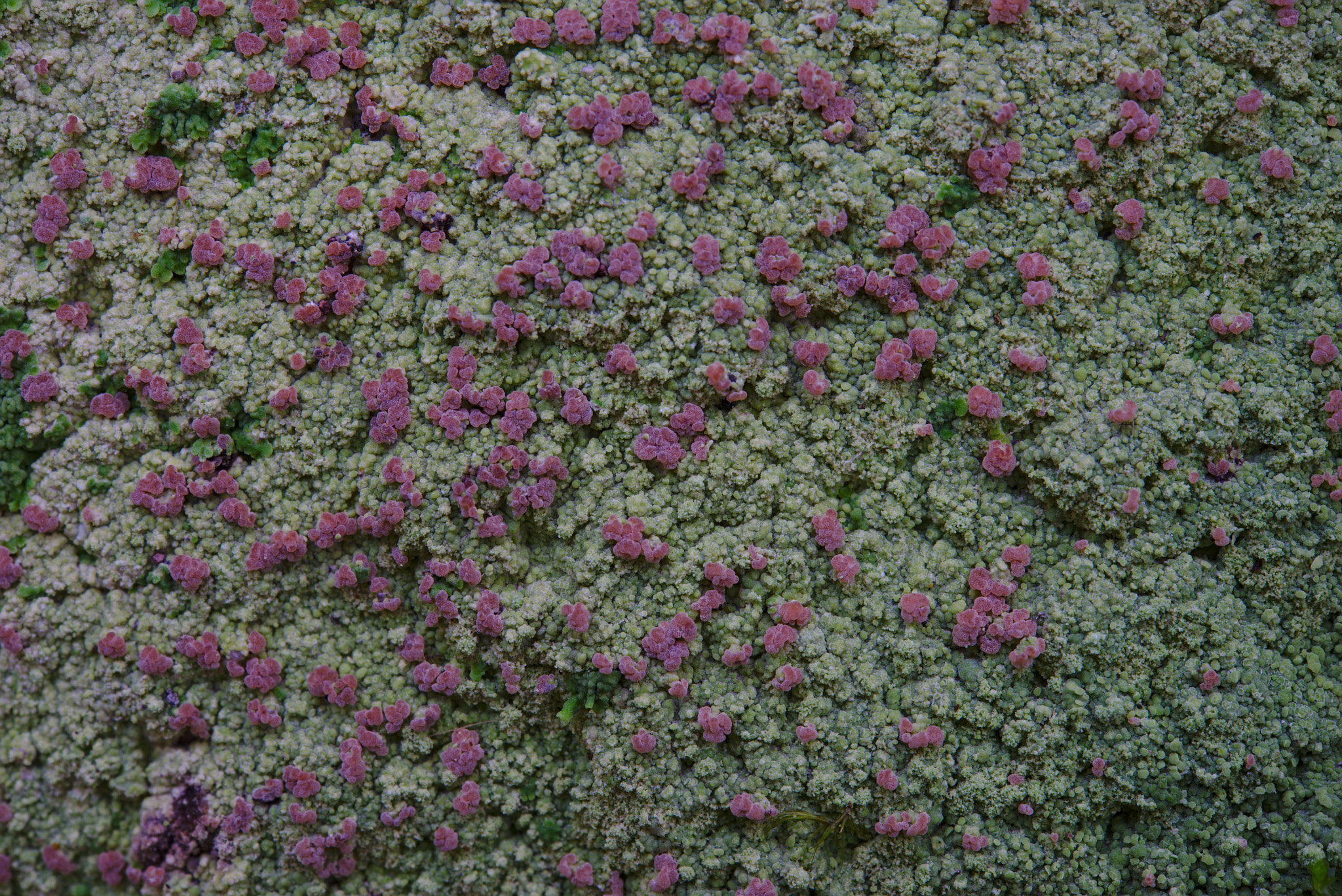

Scientific classification
- Kingdom: Fungi
- Division: Ascomycota
- Class: Lecanoromycetes
- Order: Baeomycetales
- Family: Baeomycetaceae
- Genus: Baeomyces
- Species: B. carneus

Binomial name
- Baeomyces carneus Flörke (1821)

Synonyms
- List: Patellaria carnea (Flörke) Spreng. (1827); Baeomyces rufus var. carneus (Flörke) Nyl. (1860); Lichen ericetorum var. carneus Retz. (1779); Sphyridium carneum (Retz.) Flot. (1843); Biatora byssoides f. carnea (Retz.) Rabenh. (1845); Biatora byssoides var. carnea (Retz.) Rabenh. (1845); Sphyridium fungiforme var. carneum (Retz.) Körb. (1855); Baeomyces byssoides var. carneus (Retz.) Hepp (1860); Sphyridium byssoides f. carneum (Retz.) Rabenh. (1870)

= Baeomyces carneus =

Species of lichen

Baeomyces carneus is a species of terricolous and saxicolous (ground- and rock-dwelling), squamulose lichen in the family Baeomycetaceae. This pale green to light brown lichen forms crusty patches on soil, rotting wood, or sheltered rocks, and spreads mainly through tiny detachable flakes rather than spores. It has a wide distribution across the boreal forests of North America and also occurs in Europe, New Zealand, Hawaii, and the West Indies.

== Taxonomy ==
The lichen was first scientifically described as a new species in 1821 by the German lichenologist Heinrich Gustav Flörke, in his work Deutsche Lichenen ("German Lichens"). It maintains its original name after two centuries of taxonomic history. The lichen has a circumpolar distribution, typically in coniferous forests but extending north to tundra in North America.

== Description ==
Baeomyces carneus spreads as a crust that can cover patches of soil, rotting wood or sheltered rock up to about 10 cm across. The surface ranges from coarse powder-like granules to closely packed, scale-like squamules; around the edge these scales may radiate outward to give a faint, rosette (placodioid) outline. Colour is typically very pale green or light brown. Powdery soralia are scattered and sometimes absent, but minute, detachable flakes called schizidia—up to 0.3 mm wide and perfectly round—are usually abundant and serve as the main vegetative propagules. The algal partner consists of globose or slightly ellipsoid cells (6–14 μm in diameter) arranged in a continuous layer beneath the surface.

Sexual fruit bodies are rare in British material yet common elsewhere. When present they form pinkish-brown discs up to 2 mm wide that may sit directly on the crust or rise on a solid stalk (stipe) 0.5–4 mm tall, itself occasionally branched and dusted with tiny squamules. Internally, the spore-bearing layer (hymenium) is 65–110 μm thick and threaded by slender filaments (paraphyses) whose tips swell only slightly to about 2.5 μm. Each cylindrical ascus (60–90 × 8–10 μm) releases eight colourless, spindle-shaped ascospores measuring roughly 8.5–12 × 2.5–4.5 μm.

Chemical spot tests aid field identification: the thallus is negative with bleach (C−) but turns yellow then red with potassium hydroxide (K+ yellow → red), gives a red flash with the combined KC test, and reacts orange with paraphenylenediamine (Pd+). It shows no fluorescence under long-wave ultraviolet light (UV−). These reactions reflect abundant norstictic and connorstictic acids within the crust, while gyrophoric and lecanoric acids appear later and are restricted to mature apothecia.

== Habitat and distribution ==
It is widely distributed in the boreal forest region of North America, and also occurs in Europe, New Zealand, the West Indies, and Hawaii.
