= German Leather Museum =

Museum in Offenbach am Main, Germany

- Deutsches Ledermuseum
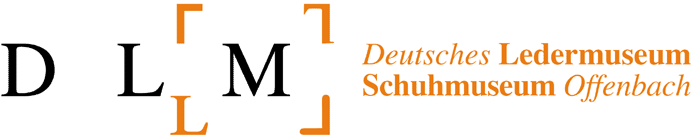

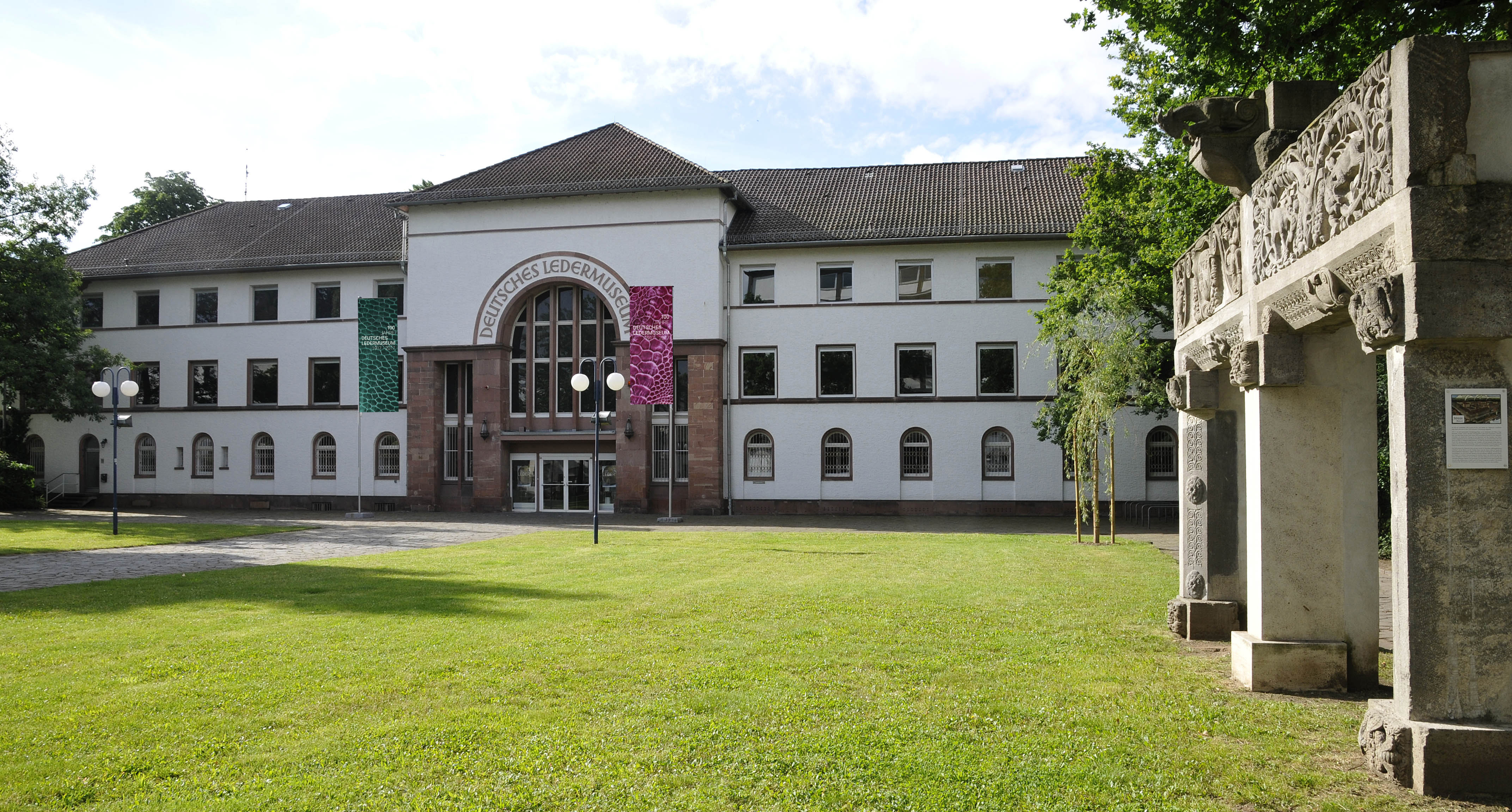
- German Leather Museum in 2017
- Established: 13 March 1917
- Location: Frankfurter Str. 86, Offenbach am Main, Germany
- Coordinates: 50°06′12″N 8°45′18″E
- Type: Museum
- Collections: Leather, Shoes
- Collection size: 30,000
- Architect: Hugo Eberhardt
- Public transit access: Offenbach Ledermuseum, Exit Ludwigstraße; X97, 103, 120 Offenbach Ludwigstraße/Ledermuseum
- Website: www.ledermuseum.de

The German Leather Museum (Deutsches Ledermuseum), located in Offenbach am Main, Hesse, Germany, is one of the largest leather museums in the world. It has a wide variety of leather items, including some exhibits, which are believed to be more than 3,000 years old. It was founded by Hugo Eberhardt in 1917.

The museum has three wings, namely, the German Shoe Museum, the Museum for Applied Art and the Ethnology Museum. The museum has a number of leather items on display including shoes, saddles, bookcases, photo albums, leather furniture, and toys.

== Bibliothek ==
- "Deutsches Ledermuseum". Frankfurter Museumsbibliotheken (in German).

== Publications ==
- Deutsches Ledermuseum; Göpfrich, Jutta; Frankenhauser, Nina; Mackert, Katharina; Weyerer, Betty; Weyerer, Kate; Weber, Ute; ICOM Committee for Conservation. Working Group on Leather and Related Materials. Interim Meeting (2012). Wettlauf mit der Vergänglichkeit = A race against transience : Katalog zur Ausstellung (in German). Offenbach. ISBN 978-3-9815440-0-8. OCLC 820786370.

== See also ==
- Museumsufer
