= Matthias Bertsch =

German musicologist

Matthias A. Bertsch
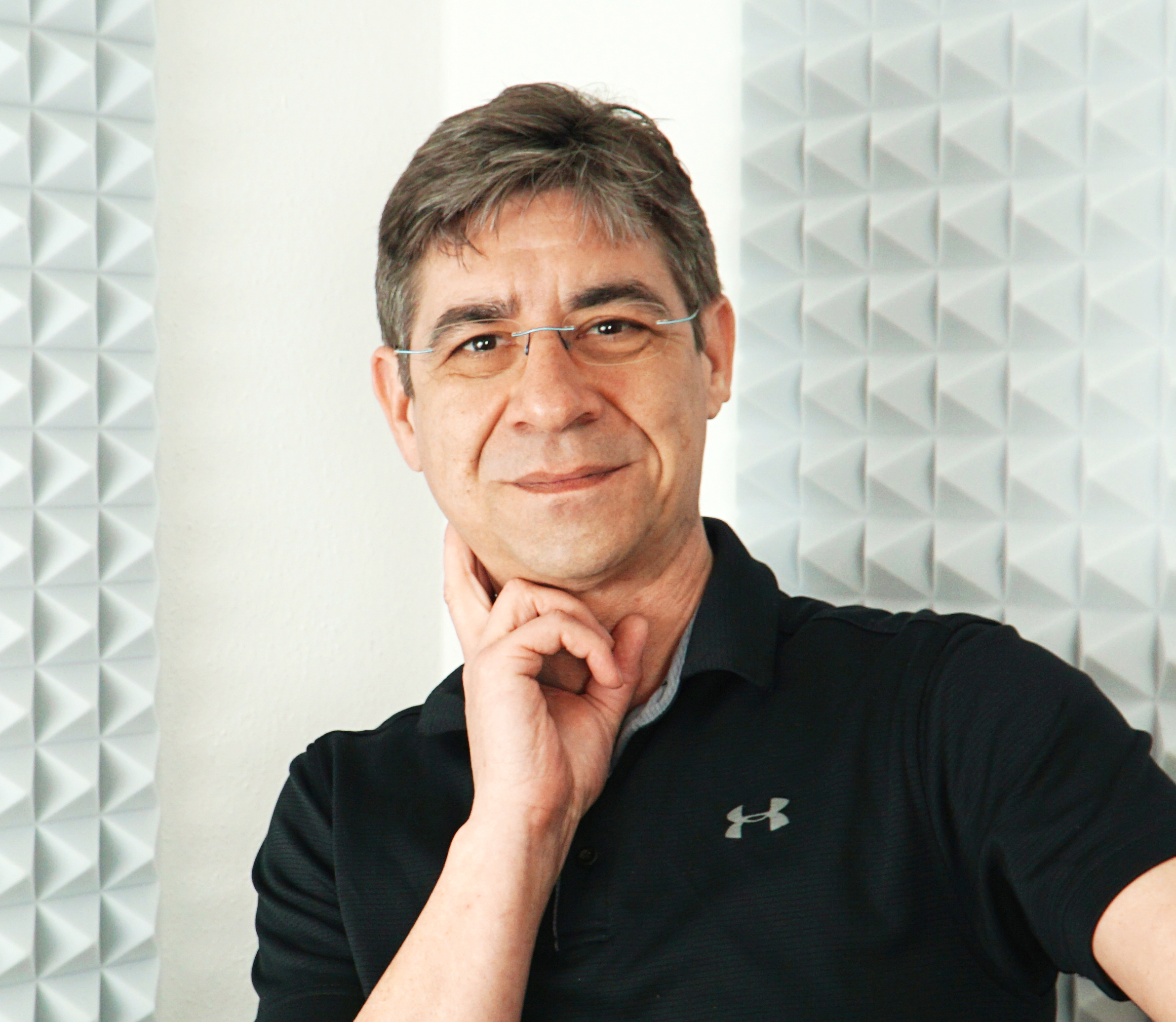
- Bertsch in 2021
- Born: 15 November 1966 (age 59); Lichtenau (Baden), Germany
- Other name: Auguste von Herzberg
- Education: University of Vienna
- Employer: University of Music and Performing Arts
- Title: Prof. Dr. MA
- Board member of: Austrian Society for Music and Medicine

Matthias Bertsch (born 1966 in Lichtenau) is a German-born Austrian musicologist, musician and professor at the University of Music and Performing Arts in Vienna. He is the President of the Austrian Society for Music and Medicine (Musicians Health Care).

== Life ==
Bertsch grew up in Lichtenau (Germany) next to the Alsacian border and moved to Vienna, Austria in 1988 for his studies in musicology at the University of Vienna. After graduation, he received his PhD in 1999 ("summa cum laude") with his work on the trumpet in the fields of "Musical Acoustics" and "Musical Physiology".

In 2003, he qualified as a professor with tenure track in musical acoustics and served as Deputy Director of the Institute of Musical Acoustics at the University of Music and Performing Arts in Vienna.

In 2008, Bertsch trained as a biofeedback coach and joined the musicians health group at the Music University as a scientist in the field of music physiology. In 2009, he was elected as president of the Austrian Society for Music and Medicine, specializing in music medicine, music physiology, and the psychology of music.

== Musicology and scientific research ==
Bertsch's interdisciplinary research combines psychology, acoustics, organology, psychoacoustics, physiology, and cognitive science. He has published extensively in peer-reviewed journals, books, and online media, as well as contributing to TV broadcasts in Austria (ORF) and Germany.

From 1998 to 2007, Bertsch conducted pioneering studies on the "Vienna Soundstyle," exploring the unique tonal characteristics and performance traditions of Viennese orchestras. His habilitation thesis, *"Wiener Klangstil - Mythos oder Realität?"* ("Vienna Soundstyle - Myth or Reality?"), examined whether audiences can distinguish the Vienna Philharmonic's sound from other orchestras. This work involved acoustic analysis, psychoacoustic studies, and perception testing, focusing on the relationship between instrument design, playing techniques, and tonal qualities.

Since 2019, in collaboration with the Medical University of Vienna, Bertsch has investigated the acoustic environment in neonatal incubators. His study, *"The 'Sound of Silence' in a Neonatal Intensive Care Unit,"* analyzed how sounds such as speech and music are transmitted within incubators and their impact on preterm infants. The research highlighted the acoustic properties of incubators, identifying frequencies amplified or attenuated within the enclosure, and suggested noise-reduction strategies to protect vulnerable neonates.

Bertsch has also contributed to the development of virtual reality (VR) systems to help musicians manage stage fright. By simulating high-pressure performance environments, his VR training programs enable musicians to confront performance anxiety in a controlled setting. Physiological metrics, such as heart rate and muscular tension, are integrated into these programs to monitor stress responses and improve readiness. His findings were presented in *"Music Performance Science with Virtual Reality: Artistic, Acoustic and Psychological Aspects and Troubles."*

== Artistic activities ==
Bertsch began playing the trumpet at age 7 and continued his studies with renowned teachers, including Györky Ottlakan, Manfred Stoppacher, Carole Dawn Reinhart, and Fred Mills, as well as attending masterclasses with Thomas Gansch. He has performed with symphony orchestras, brass ensembles, and Big Bands. During his military service, he was a member of the Stabsmusikkorps der deutschen Bundeswehr, performing at state receptions for figures like Ronald Reagan and Erich Honecker. Since 2018, he has been a member of the jazz quartet Whisky & Wine in Lower Austria.
