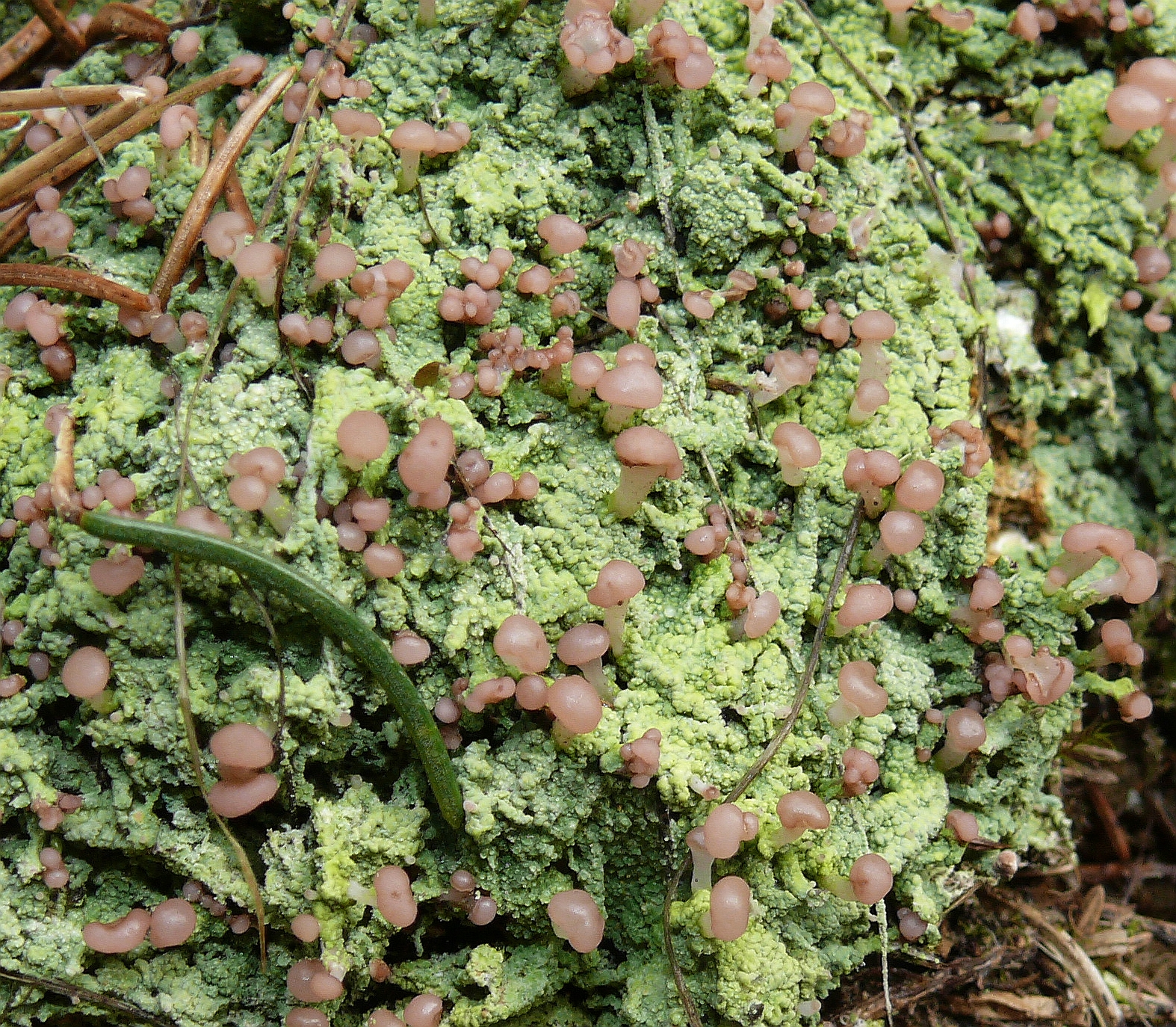
- Baeomyces rufus

Scientific classification
- Domain: Eukaryota
- Kingdom: Fungi
- Division: Ascomycota
- Class: Lecanoromycetes
- Order: Baeomycetales
- Family: Baeomycetaceae
- Genus: Baeomyces; Pers. (1794)

Type species
- Baeomyces byssoides (L.) P.Gaertn., G.Mey. & Scherb. (1802)

Species
- B. byssoides B. carneus B. heteromorphus B. lotiformis B. placophyllus B. rufus

Synonyms
- Baeomycetomyces E.A.Thomas ex Cif. & Tomas. (1953); Cladoniopsis Zahlbr. (1941); Cyanobaeis Clem. (1909); Ludovicia Trevis. (1857); Sphyridiomyces E.A.Thomas ex Cif. & Tomas. (1953); Sphyridium Flot. (1843)

= Baeomyces =

Genus of lichens

Baeomyces is a genus of lichen-forming fungi in the family Baeomycetaceae. Members of Baeomyces are commonly called beret lichens. These lichens are radily recognised by their distinctive "matchstick" appearance, with small brown fruiting bodies held up on short stalks above a crusty base. They typically grow in disturbed habitats such as roadsides, bare soil, and mining sites, where they act as pioneer colonisers of acidic ground.

== Taxonomy ==
The genus was circumscribed by German mycologist Christiaan Hendrik Persoon in 1794. Although Persoon did not designate a type species in his original description of the genus, Frederick Clements and Cornelius Lott Shear assigned Baeomyces byssoides as the type in 1931.

== Description ==
Baeomyces lichens develop an often patchy, granular to minutely leaf-like crust that clings to soil, rotting wood or shaded rock. Depending on the species the thallus ranges from a simple dusting of coarse granules to closely overlapping scales or even tiny lobes that start to resemble a miniature foliose sheet. A thin cortex of densely packed fungal cells usually carpets the surface, but in soraliate species – those that form pale powdery pustules packed with symbiotic units – the cortex breaks down and is missing over the soralia. The green algal partner belongs to Coccomyxa or Elliptochloris and forms a continuous layer beneath the cortex; where the surface is scratched the algae become visible as a green smear. Vegetative propagules are limited to soralia and discoid schizidia – detachable flakes of cortex and algae that can establish new colonies elsewhere – as true isidia never form in the genus.

The sexual fruit bodies are the genus's trademark "matchsticks": brown apothecial discs held aloft on short, sometimes branched stalks (stipes or podetia). A few species reduce the stalk almost to nothing so the discs sit close to the thallus, but in most the stalk is solid, corticate and may even contain algal cells in its upper half. The spore-bearing layer (hymenium) beneath each disc is colourless to pale brown; its gelatinous matrix remains iodine-negative, and the supporting paraphyses twist and contort, ending in slightly swollen brown tips. Cylindrical asci produce eight colourless spores that are spindle- or ellipsoid-shaped and lack true septa, though an optical partition can occur late in development; the spores usually contain one or two oil droplets. Asexual reproduction takes place in microscopic pycnidia immersed in warty swellings on the crust, releasing minute rod-shaped conidia. Chemically the thallus contains stictic acid derivatives, while gyrophoric and lecanoric acids are confined to the apothecia and appear only once the paraphyses and asci have matured.

== Ecology ==
Baeomyces favours transient and freshly disturbed locations on acidic gravelly ground, such as road margins, earthen slopes, spoil tips from mining operations, and arctic heathlands, though it sometimes colonises rock faces or bark surfaces.

== Species ==
As of June 2025, Species Fungorum (in the Catalogue of Life) accepts 6 species of Baeomyces.

- Baeomyces byssoides (L.) P.Gaertn., B.Mey. & Scherb. (1802)
- Baeomyces carneus Flörke (1821)
- Baeomyces heteromorphus Nyl. ex C.Bab. & Mitt. (1859)
- Baeomyces lotiformis S.N.Cao (2017) – China
- Baeomyces placophyllus Ach. (1803)
- Baeomyces rufus (Huds.) Rebent. (1804)
