= Georg-Christof Bertsch =

German Design Consultant and University Lecturer

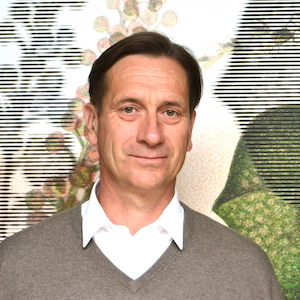
- Born: May 30, 1959 (age 67); Seeheim-Jugenheim, Germany
- Years active: 1988-Present
- Website: bertsch-bertsch.com

Georg-Christof Bertsch (born 30 May 1959 in Seeheim-Jugenheim) is a German corporate identity and organizational behavior consultant (Systemische Organisationsberatung according to SW&F) and podcast anchorman of DDCAST.

== Background ==
Georg-Christof Bertsch is the third son to Robert Bertsch (1922-1997), principal of a special education grammar school, and Anny Bertsch, née Herling (1916-2009). Beginning in the early 70s, Robert and Anny were initiating leaders in the reconciliation between their hometown and France (Villenave-d'Ornon), the UK (Chesterfield) and Israel, helping to establish a sister city or community relations in these three countries. In 1988, Robert Bertsch published "Juden in Seeheim und Jugenheim", the first historical account of Jewish life in Seeheim-Jugenheim, Germany. The book was launched to commemorate the 50th anniversary of Kristallnacht. Bertsch is a Rotary International member at RC Frankfurt Friedensbrücke. Paul Harris Fellow since 2022. He is an elected member of DDC German Designer Club. He is an atheist.

== Professional career ==
Bertsch studied history and art history at Technische Universität Berlin and went on to set up Germany's first Design management office with Matthias Dietz in 1988. In 1995 he and his wife Annette founded Bertsch & Bertsch Corporate design Corporate Communications GmbH (limited liability company). The foundation of BERTSCH.BRAND CONSULTANTS followed in 2005. This firm puts its focus on providing consultancy services for complex branding, positioning and change processes for major companies. Between 2007-2009 Bertsch was a guest lecturer at the Hesse State University of Art and Design (Hochschule für Gestaltung Offenbach) where served as honorary professor from 2009-22. Together with Prof. Dr. Kai Vöckler and Prof. Peter Eckart he launched the Designinstitut Mobilität und Logistik (Designinstitute of Mobility and Logistics) at HfG Offenbach in 2014. He is working based on the principles of Systemische Organisationsberatung according to SW&F Since 2025 he serves as Director Program & content of WDC, the biggest project of World Design Capital Frankfurt Rhein Main 2026.

== Social activity ==
Between 1990 and 95 Bertsch was president of Design Horizonte Frankfurt. In 1996, together with Dr. Hans Höger he curated “Attitudes for the Next Millennium” at the Aspen Institute's International Aspen Design Conference. Between 2004 and 2013 sat on the board of Friends of Städelschule Portikus (registered association) in Frankfurt, officiating as vice-president from 2004-2010. On 27 May 2008, he became the first German to be elected to the Board of Governors of the Bezalel Academy of Art and Design in Jerusalem. He served in this function until June 2022. From 2010 to 2012 he headed the Cumulus global water working group (). He has been a board member of WELTKULTUREN Museum Frankfurt from 2011 to 22 (Frankfurt Museum of World Cultures). Co-founder of fokus.energie in 2014 Member of the advisory board of DDC (Deutscher Designer Club German Designer's Association) since 2018. Co-founder of technika e.V., Karlsruhe, 2019. Member of BitKom working group digital design since 2020. ()

== Works (a selection) ==
- Ethik <?> Digitales Design, Bertsch, Georg-Christof / Lauenroth, Kim, in: Jahrbuch Digitaldesign der bitKom, bitKom e.V., Berlin, 2022 pp.117-126
- Identifying Humanitarian Design-opportunities in spaces of extreme restrictions, Bertsch, Georg-Christof, Jaeger, Thomas et al, published at Design Networking Hub of the German Design Council, 2.8.2022
- Design muss als politisch hoch aufgeladene Praxis gelehrt werden, pp. 412ff in: Vöckler, Kai, Schwer. Thilo, Der Offenbacher Ansatz. Zu Theorie der Produktsprache. Transscript Verlag, Bielefeld, 2021
- What is our reference framework for sustainable digital design? Speech given at the Bikom Digital Design working group, online / Frankfurt on 2.6.2020
- Warum ist Design nicht systemrelevant, GC Bertsch interviewed by Martina Metzner für DDC June, 2020
- NICHTWORT Conférence on Design and language education, chair and editor in chief, 2017 *
- DML Blog mobile futures editor in chief and author
- THE WORD Chennai Water Forum - embrace our rivers at Kalakshetra Foundation, Chennai Schippert, Helmut; Bertsch, Georg-Christof; Balsavar, Nandan (chairs), published by Asian College of Journalism, Goethe Institut Max Muller Bhavan, 2016
- Bücher und Buchstaben und Schreibschrift in: Klimmt, Reinhard ed. Reihenweise. Die Taschenbücher der 50er Jahre, 2 volumes. Achill Press, 2016
- The effect of risk management on brand and reputation management in: Risk Management in Law Firms, Strategies for Safeguarding the Future, ed. by Knott, Hermann J.; International Bar Association, Global Business Publishing, London, 2014": Bertsch, Georg-Christof, BERTSCH.BRAND CONSULTANTS / Chester, Simon, Heenan Blaikie LLP / Hunter, Jane, Aon Risk Solutions
- Material Grove - from traditional material to material innovation Holzbach, Markus / Bertsch, Georg-Christof (editors), HfG University of Art & Design Offenbach Press, 2014
- "Urban Water - A Challenge for Product Designers" Conference Paper Cumulus Conference Helsinki, Finland, May 24-27th, Aalto University, Helsinki, 2012
- Two goddesses of Indian design, Stylepark Nov 2011
- Product Design & Water – towards a vision for education Conference Paper Cumulus Paris, France, May 19–22. Université de Sèvres, Paris, 2011
- klimaroute.de – learning to understand climate change and rivers (German) as editor in chief. Frankfurt am Main, launch Jan 13th 2011
- Undisciplined? Design in an age of massive change in: Höger, Hans ed: Design Research. Mailand 2008, pp. 96–117.
- Avrupali, kendi kültür baskentini tanimiyor in: Cumhuriyet Hafta vom 31. August 2007, pp. pp 1 and 13
- The Benefits of Organizing International Design Workshops to Gain a Deeper Understanding of the Local Context in: Juried Education Papers. Global Issues (The ICSID IDSA World Congress, Oct. 17-20 2007, San Francisco, USA) together with Özlem Er.
- Der Raum der Erinnerung (Room of Memory) in: Holt, Jan ed: V+W Designmatrix. Hatje Cantz, Ostfildern 2006, pp. pp 113–144.
- Build or Die. Constructing survival. In: Fezer, Jesko ed: Designcity. Die Gestalten Verlag, Berlin 2006, pp 149 f.
- Common Sense in: Wurster, Christian ed: V+W Privatbuch. Selbstverlag Vogt + Weizenegger, Berlin 2005, pp. pp 104 ff.
- www.euro-design-guide.de Germany's first design open platform on the Internet.
- Ambiente Euro Design Guide in collaboration with Barbara Friedrich, the first German lexicon on contemporary design, 1990
