= Lichtenau, Baden-Württemberg =

Lichtenau
- Town
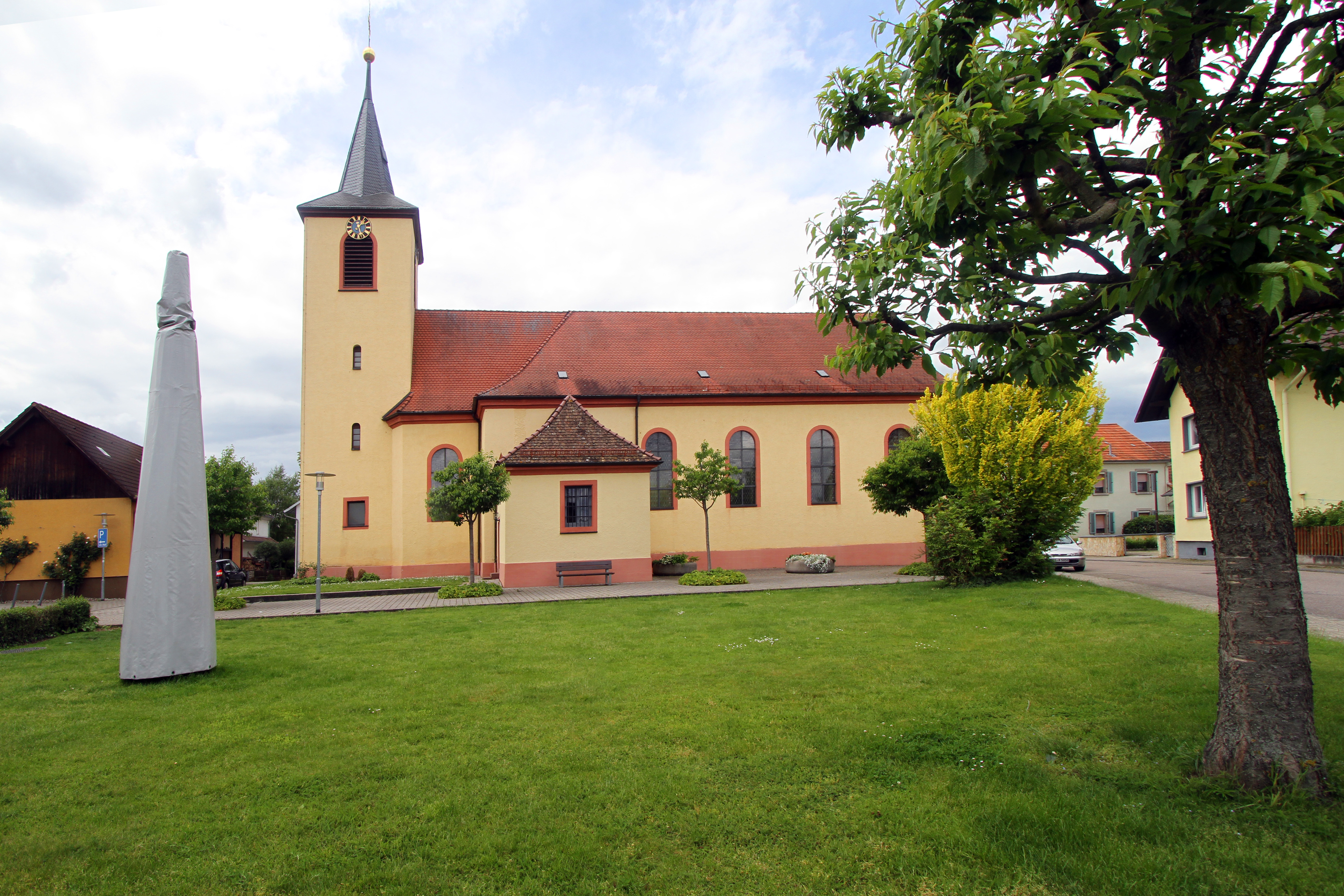
- Church of Holy Cross in Lichtenau-Ulm

- Coat of arms

- Location of Lichtenau within Rastatt district
- Interactive map of Lichtenau
- Location within Germany Location within Baden-Württemberg
- Coordinates: 48°43′34″N 08°00′18″E
- Country: Germany
- State: Baden-Württemberg
- Admin. region: Karlsruhe
- District: Rastatt

Government
  - Mayor (2017–25): Christian Greilach

Area
  - Total: 27.62 km^{2} (10.66 sq mi)
- Elevation: 127 m (417 ft)

Population (2025-12-31)
  - Total: 4,969
  - Density: 179.9/km^{2} (466.0/sq mi)
- Time zone: UTC+01:00 (CET)
  - Summer (DST): UTC+02:00 (CEST)
- Postal codes: 77839
- Dialling codes: 07227
- Vehicle registration: RA
- Website: www.lichtenau-baden.de

Lichtenau (German pronunciation: [ˈlɪçtənaʊ]) is a small town in Rastatt district in southwestern Baden-Württemberg, Germany.

== Geography ==
Lichtenau is located in the Upper Rhine River Plains on the right bank of the Rhine between Rastatt and Kehl.

=== Neighboring communities ===
The city shares borders with the following communities, listed clockwise from the north: Rheinmünster, Ottersweier, Achern and Rheinau. West of the city is the Rhine and with it the French border.

=== Boroughs ===
The city of Lichtenau consists of Lichtenau (proper), Scherzheim, Ulm, Muckenschopf and Grauelsbaum.

== History ==
Lichtenau developed from a water castle that the Bishop of Strasbourg had built in the years 1293 to 1296, complete with defensive wall, ditch and parapet. In 1300 Lichtenau received its city charter and until its Slighting in 1686 it remained a fortress. After the line of the Counts of Hanau-Lichtenau ended the city became part of Hesse in 1736 and then was made part of Baden together with the Hanauerland in 1803.

=== District reform ===
In Lichtenau the Baden-Württemberg district reform of the 1970s took place in stages.

Town	Merged into Lichtenau as of
Scherzheim	January 1, 1972
Ulm	January 1, 1973
Muckenschopf	January 1, 1974
Grauelsbaum	January 1, 1975

== Government ==
The city is part of the administrative district of "Rheinmünster-Lichtenau" with seat in Rheinmünster.

=== City council ===
In addition to the mayor and city council president the council is made up of 20 members. The councilmen and councilwomen belong to political parties as follows:

Party	Seats
CDU	9
SPD	6
Bündnis 90/Green Party	2
Independents	3

== People ==
- Gabriele Frechen (born October 12, 1956), politician.

== Twin cities ==
- Lichtenberg, Bas-Rhin, France
