= Mike Bertsch =

American ice hockey player

Playing career
- 1969–1973: Colorado College

Coaching career (HC unless noted)
- 1978–1982: Colorado College (assistant)
- 1982–1988: Colorado College

Head coaching record
- Overall: 65-157-6

Mike Bertsch is a former ice hockey player and coach for Colorado College. Bertsch is currently working for USA Hockey after spending several years in the private sector.

== Career ==
Over Bertsch's 4-year stint as a player for the Tigers, he posted several good seasons as a scorer, finishing 6th all time in school history in 1972–73 with 145 points in 124 games. The scoring prowess did not, however, translate into much on-ice success as CC finished each season with a losing record and made the playoffs only once during his tenure (albeit as the final qualifier). Once Bertsch graduated from Colorado College his playing days were over, but his affiliation with his alma mater had only just begun. Bertsch returned to Colorado Springs in the fall of 1978 to join the staff of his former head coach Jeff Sauer as an assistant.

Bertsch stayed in that role for four seasons before Sauer left to take over at Wisconsin and Mike was chosen as his successor. After a stumble out of the gate, Bertsch pushed the Tigers to at least respectable records in the mid-1980s, but CC bottomed out in 1987–88 with a school record 33-loss season (though not the worst season in program history) and Bertsch was done as coach after the season.

After leaving CC Bertsch moved on to the private sector, working for both Current Inc. and Deluxe Corporation over a 14-year span. However, he couldn't stay away from the game and in 2003 began working for USA Hockey, spending most of his time working in the business and marketing departments. As of 2014 Bertsch is still working for USA Hockey as Senior Director of Corporate Affairs.

== Career statistics ==
			Regular season					Playoffs
Season	Team	League	GP	G	A	Pts	PIM	GP	G	A	Pts	PIM
1969–70	Colorado College	NCAA	30	2	6	9	24	—	—	—	—	—
1970–71	Colorado College	NCAA	28	13	14	27	16	—	—	—	—	—
1971–72	Colorado College	NCAA	32	22	29	51	25	—	—	—	—	—
1972–73	Colorado College	NCAA	34	19	39	58	20	—	—	—	—	—
NCAA totals			124	56	88	145	85	—	—	—	—	—

== Head coaching record ==
Record table
Season	Team	Overall	Conference	Standing	Postseason
Colorado College Tigers (WCHA) (1982–1988)
1982-83	Colorado College	6-28-1	2-24-0	6th	WCHA Quarterfinals
1983-84	Colorado College	9-25-1	5-21-0	6th	WCHA Quarterfinals
1984-85	Colorado College	17-21-0	15-19-0	6th	WCHA Quarterfinals
1985-86	Colorado College	12-26-2	11-21-2	7th	WCHA First Round
1986-87	Colorado College	17-24-1	12-22-1	6th	WCHA Semifinals
1987-88	Colorado College	4-33-1	3-31-1	8th	WCHA First Round
Colorado College:		65-157-6	48-138-4		
Total:		65-157-6			
National champion Postseason invitational champion Conference regular season champion Conference regular season and conference tournament champion Division regular season champion Division regular season and conference tournament champion Conference tournament champion
