= Klaus Hesse =

German graphic designer (born 1954)

Klaus Hesse (born 1954 in Elberfeld) is a German graphic designer.

== Life ==
Klaus Hesse studied photography and typography at the University of Wupperthal. In 1988, together with Christine Hesse he founded the agency Hesse Design in Düsseldorf; the duo also ran an office in Berlin between 2001 and 2004. In 2016, he founded another studio in Shanghai, China. The agency is behind corporate designs for Audi, Bewag, Dekra, State Capital Düsseldorf, the Robert Bosch Foundation, Stuttgart Trade Fair, Swarovski and the Upper Middle Rhine World Heritage Site, to name a few. They have been nominated for the Design Award of the Federal Republic of Germany on several occasions and have won over 200 national and international awards. In 2006, Klaus Hesse won the long-established competition for the visual identity for the Kiel Regatta Week that year.

From 1993 through 1999, he taught as a professor for communication design at Dortmund University of Applied Sciences and the University of Essen (today Folkwang University of the Arts). Klaus Hesse has been head of the Communications Design Department at the University of Art and Design Offenbach am Main from 1999 to 2020. In 2006, his faculty topped the ranking of creative universities as chosen by German news magazine Focus. From 2011 to 2018, he was dean of the art department. Klaus Hesse was co-initiator of the 11 Designers for Germany on occasion of the 2006 World Cup and of the 1st Graphic Design Biennale Germany China in 2010, and editor-in-chef of the sushi yearbook from 1998 through 2015. He has also conducted a series of tours giving lectures and holding workshops, which took him to Kraków, Poland, Puebla, Mexico, Basel, Switzerland, the Chinese metropolises of Beijing, Hong Kong, Shanghai, Hangzhou, Wuhan, Xi'an and Chongqing, Sydney, Australia and Cape Town, South Africa. Hesse is also a member of the Type Directors’ Club, New York.

== Publications ==
- The Kids want communism! 200 Years Karl Marx (Author and editor), HfG Verlag Offenbach 2018, ISBN 978-3-945365-20-5.
- Next. Sushi 15 (Chief editor and author), Publisher AV-Edition 2015, ISBN 978-3-89986-216-4.
- Pointed. (Author and designer), Hermann Schmidt Mainz, Mainz 2010, ISBN 978-3-87439-804-6.
- Hier vorne. (Author and editor), HfG Offenbach, Offenbach/Main 2006, ISBN 3-921997-60-7.
- Der Helvetica-Mann. (Author and editor), Hermann Schmidt Mainz, Mainz 1999, ISBN 3-87439-470-0.
- sushi - Jahresmagazin für junge Kreativität (Editor-in-chef), 1998 through 2015, published by Art Directors Club of Germany.

== Published articles ==
- Above a certain level, the sex is random. (Interview, page 11/2009)
- The fear of the voter paralyzes all parties. To the campaigning for the 2009 federal elections (Offenbach Post 22, September 2009)
- PingPongProjekt, Interview (Autumn 2008 in China, Spring 2009 in Germany, Jiangxi Publishing Group, ISBN 978-7-80749-606-9, Chinese/Germany)
- Schön und Wider - Ein Plädoyer für die Gestaltung hinter der Gestaltung (Beef magazine 03/2008)
- Book review for Die schönsten deutschen Bücher/Stiftung Buchkunst, Klaus Hesse et al. with Roger Willemsen, Max Küng, Eckhard Henscheid, Jost Hochuli and Manfred Sack, March 2007, ISBN 978-3-7657-2877-8)
- Zeichengeschichten. Co-author Klaus Hesse (Modo Verlag Freiburg 2007, German ISBN 978-3-937014-66-1, English ISBN 978-3-937014-67-8)
- Achte auf die Pfoten. Foreword in “100 Beste Plakate-Buch” (Hermann Schmidt Mainz, Mainz 2006, ISBN 3-87439-703-3)
- Die Brüche am Main. Eine Stadt gründet sich neu. B-Side, HfG Offenbach, Offenbach/Main 2005, ISBN 3-921997-50-X
- In between. The Academy of Art and Design Offenbach. (Letterspace. TDC New York, Winter 2004)
- What's next? A preliminary résumé of the past decade of digitalized communications. (DM Journal, Boston/USA, Summer 2003)

== Exhibitions ==
- 2020 Making Crisis Visible, Senckenberg Naturmuseum Frankfurt/Germany
- 2019 What’s behind the Wall, Fengxian Museum Shanghai/China
- 2018 Marx – and now? Frankfurt/Germany
- 2018 Marx 200, Stadtbibliothek Trier/Germany
- 2018 Marx 200, Nanjing/China
- 2018 Making Crisis Visible, Leibniz Gemeinschaft, Berlin/Germany
- 2017 The new Blue, Eichenzell/Germany
- 2017 The new Blue, Jingdezhen/China
- 2017 Kant on the Beach, Nida/Lithuania
- 2016 Something in the eye, Karmeliter monastery, Frankfurt/Germany
- 2016 Let it grow, Nanjing/China
- 2015 Class Hesse Shanghai/China
- 2012 Identity by doing, China Academy of Art, Hangzhou/China
- 2010 Grafikdesign Biennale Deutschland/China, Offenbach/Germany
- 2010 Wendezeiten. 20 Jahre danach, Cottbus/Germany
- 2009 Graphic Design Biennale China/Germany, Xi'an/China
- 2009 Marken 1989-2009, Ritterstrasse 11, Düsseldorf/Germany
- 2007 Dimension der Fläche, international travelling exhibition by the Goethe Institute
- 2007 Ständige Plakatsammlung, Museum of Design, Zurich/Switzerland
- 2006 Deutschlandjahr, International Poster Exhibition, Tokushima/Japan
- 2006 Diseño Editorial, Museo Poblano de Arte Virreinal Puebla, Mexico, among others with Ricardo Salas, Isidor Ferrer, Leonel Sagahón, Gabriela Rodriguez
- 2005 Ball im Kopf. Kult ums Kicken, Museum of Arts and Crafts, Hamburg/Germany
- 2005 T-Goal, World Cup 2006 Corporate Design, Associazione italiana progrettazione, Bozen-Bolzano/Italy
- 2005 handmade Plakat, Museum of Design, Zurich/Switzerland
- 2003 11designer für Deutschland, presentation and exhibition, University of the Arts, Berlin/Germany
- 1997 Designinnovationen Berlin, International Design Center, Berlin/Germany
- 1996 Design and identity, Louisiana Museum of Modern Art Copenhagen/Denmark

== Literature ==
- City of ideas Düsseldorf (Droste Verlag Düsseldorf/Germany, 2013, ISBN 978-3-03778-231-6.)
- Kiel Week – History of a design competition. (Lars Müller Publishers, CH 2010, ISBN 978-3-03-778231-6)
- German Graphic Style. Hesse Design (Liaoning Science and Technology Publishing House 2006)
- Corporate Identity. Hesse Design (Author Yang Renmin, Southwest-China Normal University Press 2006, ISBN 7-5621-3716-1/J-395)
- Loghi alternativi. Hesse Design (Goya, L' Arte del vivere, Italy, June 2006)
- The faces of the world cup. Hesse Design (c-design, Beijing/China, May 2006)
- Hesse Design, from 1988 until now. (360° Concept and Design Magazin, Taipei/Taiwan March 2006)
- Corporate Identity für Verwaltungen und Gemeinden. Hesse Design (by Christian Jaquet, Haupt Verlag, Bern/Switzerland 2005)
- Typography Twentyfive TDC NY 2005. Klaus Hesse et al. with Milton Glaser, Ed Benguiat, Joe Duffy, Jack Anderson, Paula Scher, Niklaus Troxler
- Plakatserien Klaus Hesse. 1000 Graphic Elements, Rockport Publishing, USA 2004
- Logotypes Hesse Design. Around Europe Logos, Index Book, Barcelona/Spain 2004
- Plakatserien von Klaus Hesse. Designs that stand up, Rockport Publishing, USA 2004
- Corporate Designs von Hesse Design. Branding Design, Graphic-sha Publishing, Tokyo/Japan 2004
- Erco Lightcontrol Interface von Hesse Design. Information Design Source Book 2003, Tokyo/Japan
