= Baviera =

Baviera is a Spanish-language surname. It is also the name for the German state of Bavaria in Spanish, Italian and Portuguese.

Notable people with the surname include:

- Aileen Baviera (1959–2020), a Filipino academic
- José Baviera (1906–1981), a Spanish film actor
- Vincenzo Baviera (born 1945), a Swiss sculptor

== See also ==
- Julio Cervera Baviera (1854–1927), a Spanish engineer
- Villa Baviera, a former internment camp in Chile
