= Vincenzo Baviera =

Swiss sculptor

- Born: 28 July 1945 (age 79); Zürich, Switzerland
- Education: ETH Zürich, Zürich University
- Known for: sculpture
- Movement: Kinetic art
- Website: www.baviera.info

Vincenzo Baviera (born 28 July 1945) is a Swiss sculptor. He was born in Zürich, Switzerland.

== Biography ==
In 1964–69, he studied architecture at ETH Zurich. In 1974, he graduated social psychology and ethnology at the University of Zürich. He became the professor of sculpture at the Hochschule für Gestaltung in Offenbach am Main in 1984. In 1988, he was awarded with the Kainz Medal. He was the lecturer of the ETH Zürich from 1991 to 1996. In 1997, he won artist in residence at the Guernsey College for Further Education.

== Exhibitions ==
- 1985 Kunstmuseum Winterthur, Switzerland
- 1996 Kunsthalle Recklinghausen, Germany
- 1997 Kunsthalle Winterthur, Switzerland
- 1998 Museum Wiesbaden, Germany
- 2010 Streetarts Festival, Stühlingen, Germany

== Gallery ==
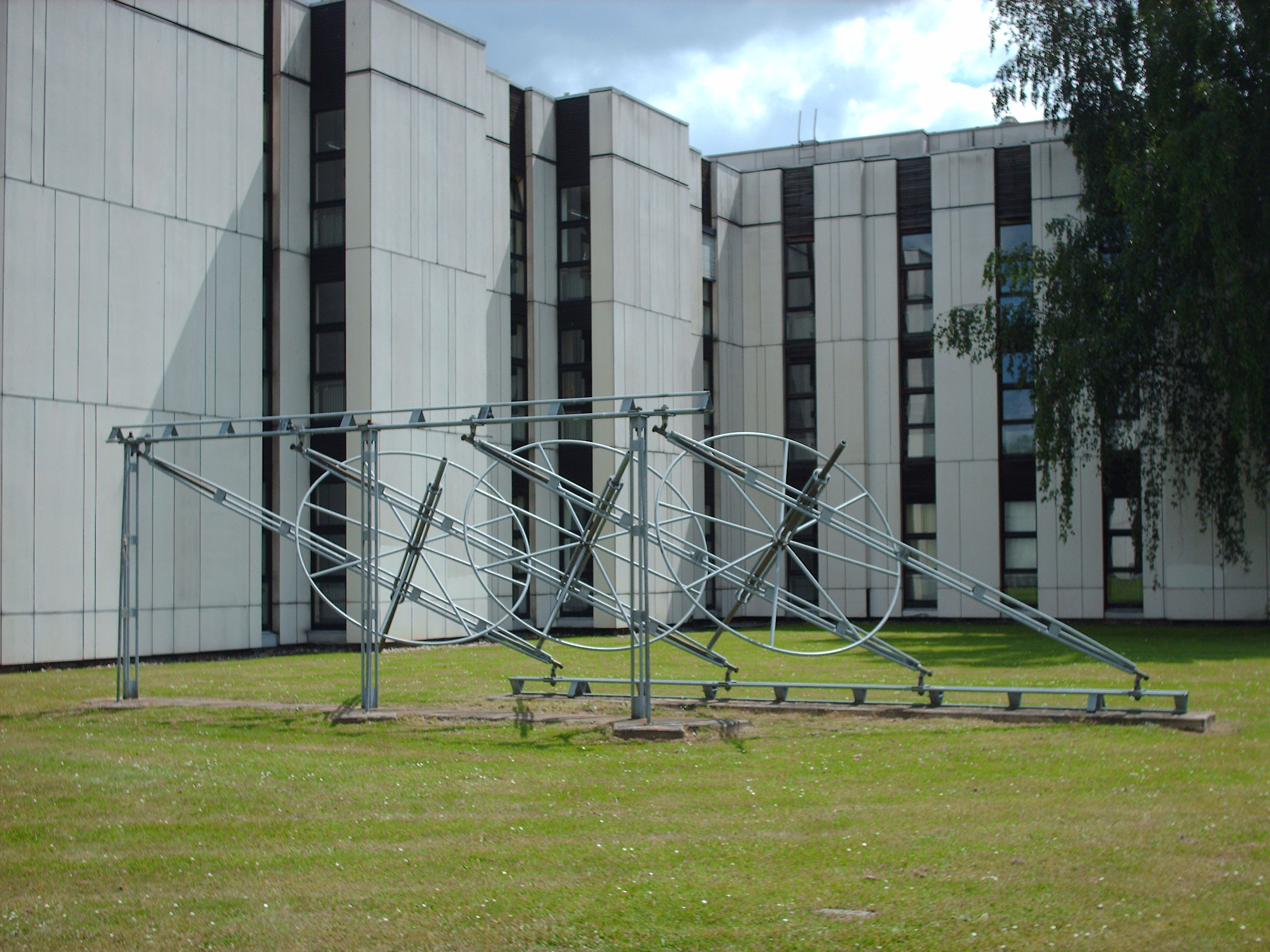
Räderwerk Nord (Engrenage Nord), 1986-1989, University of Giessen

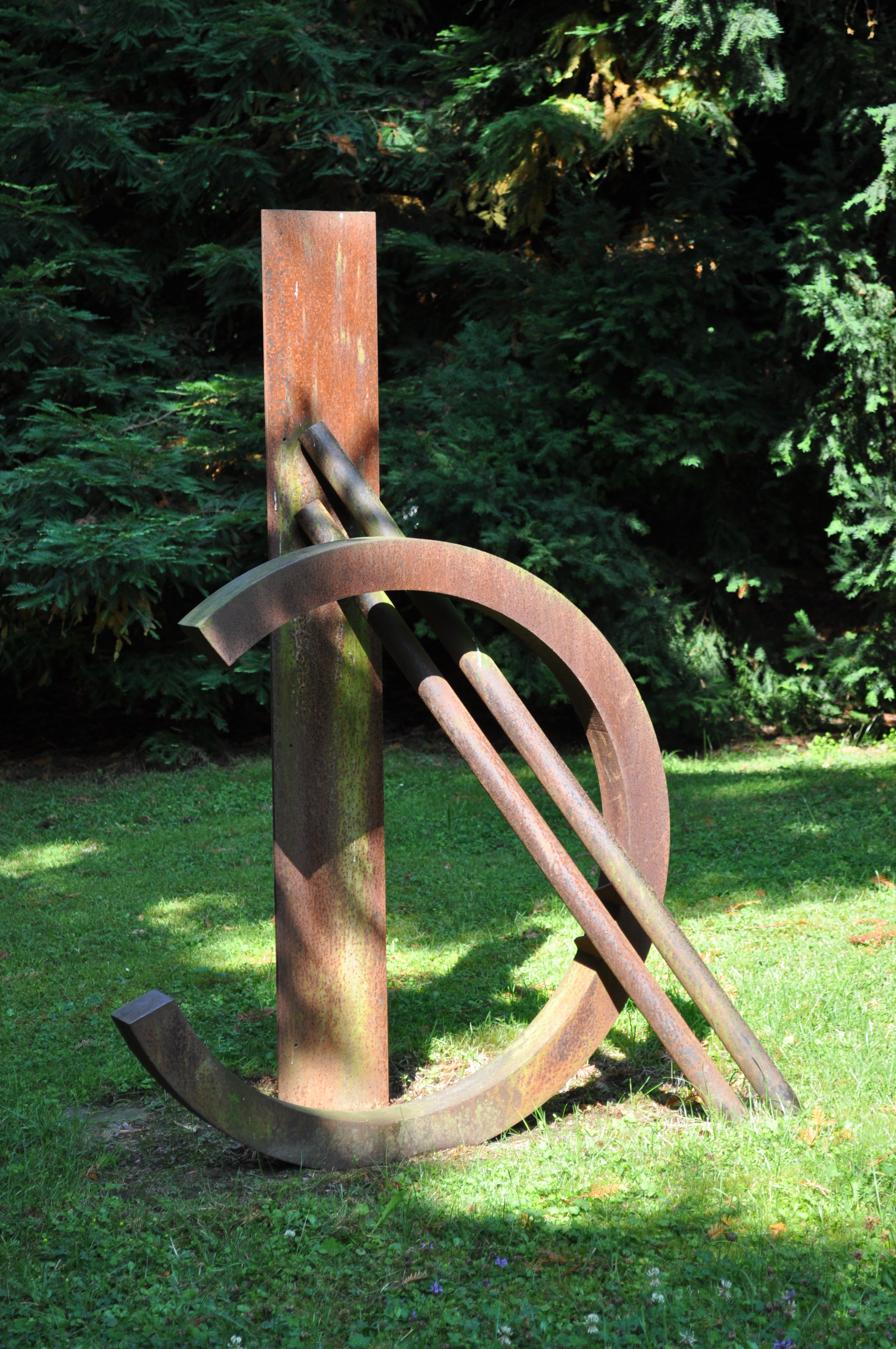
Without title, 1993, Bad Soden am Taunus

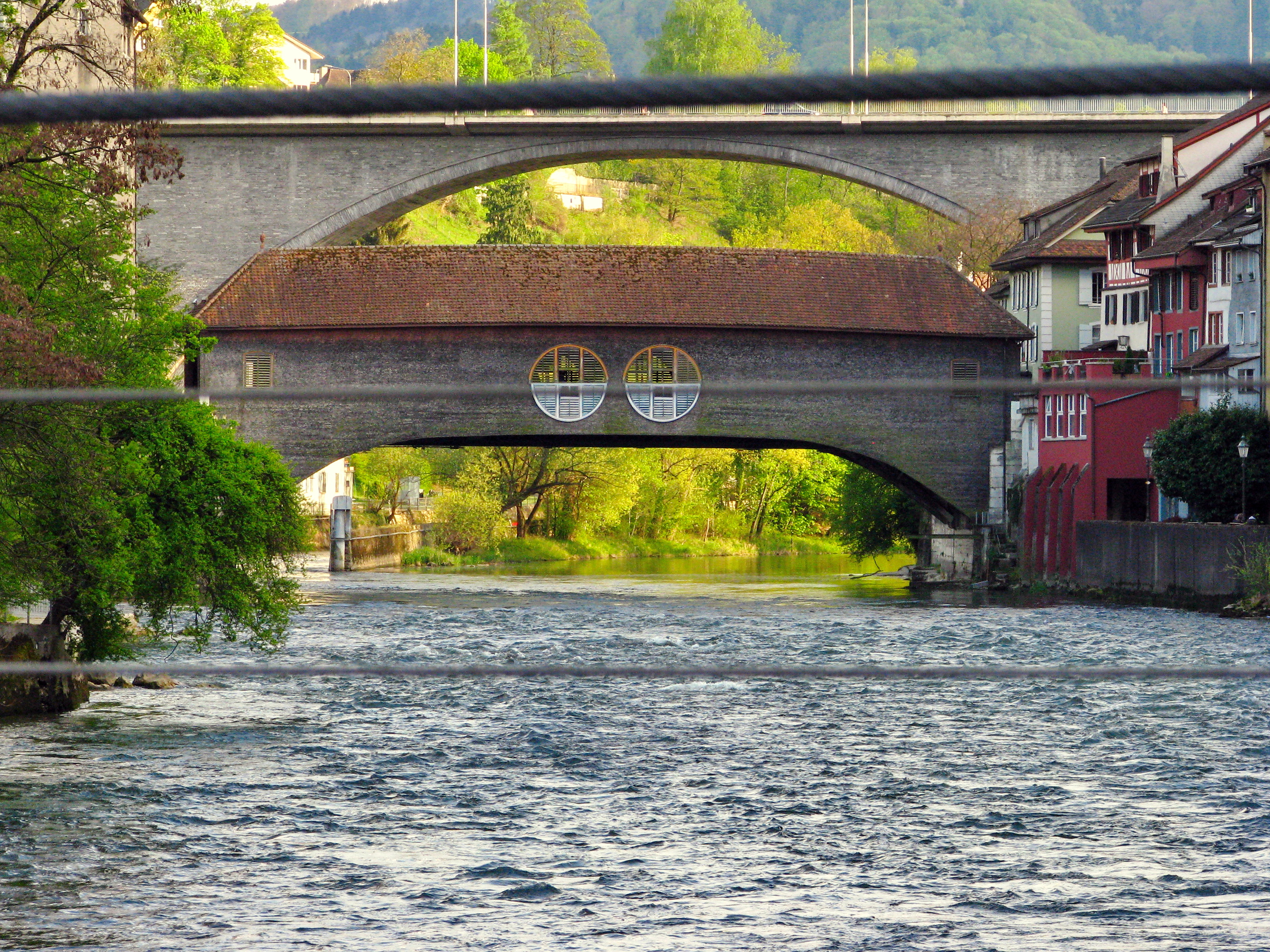
Observation of Limmat at Baden, Switzerland

== Bibliography ==
- Baviera, Vincenzo; Schneider, Uta; Wirks, Hartmut (2010). Vincenzo Baviera : Arbeiten im Raum. Zürich: Züst. ISBN 9783905328028.
