= Juliane Rebentisch =

German philosopher and art historian (born 1970)

Juliane Rebentisch (born 1970, Bonn) is a German philosopher and art historian whose research focuses on the history and politics of aesthetics. She is the author of three books: Aesthetics of Installation Art (Sternberg, 2003), The Art of Freedom: On the Dialectics of Democratic Existence (Polity, 2012), and Theorien der Gegenwartskunst (Junius, 2013), and has edited numerous volumes on aesthetics, ethics, and political philosophy in both German and English. Josef Chytry, in the academic journal Journal of Aesthetics and Art Criticism, called Aesthetics of Installation Art a "formidable work." In 2017, she received the Lessing Prize from the city of Hamburg, an award given to major German cultural figures who have a connection to the city; she was the first woman to be awarded the Lessing Prize of the Free and Hanseatic City of Hamburg since it was given to Hannah Arendt in 1959.

Rebentisch earned her doctorate at the University of Potsdam in 2002, and held a postdoctoral position at Johann Wolfgang Goethe-Universität in Frankfurt in 2010. Since October 2011, she has been professor of philosophy and Aesthetics at HfG Offenbach (School of Design), where she also serves as vice president. From 2015 to 2018, she was President of the German Society of Aesthetics (Deutsche Gesellschaft für Ästhetik), and is a member of the Research Council of the University of Frankfurt Institute for Social Research. In April 2019, Princeton University announced that Rebentisch would become a permanent visiting professor in the Department of German beginning in the fall semester of 2019.
