= Hochschule für Gestaltung Schwäbisch Gmünd =

Coordinates: 48.7931°N 9.7936°E

- Type: Public university
- Established: 1776
- President: Maren Schmohl
- Administrative staff: 24 (professors)
- Students: 662 WS 2014/15
- Location: Schwäbisch Gmünd, Germany
- Website: www.hfg-gmuend.de hfg-gmuend.de/en/ProfilePhilosophy

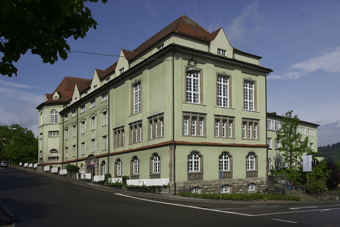
HfG Schwäbisch Gmünd

The Hochschule für Gestaltung Schwäbisch Gmünd (HfG Schwäbisch Gmünd) is a university of applied sciences for design in the German State of Baden-Württemberg. Teaching at the HfG is influenced by the Bauhaus and the Ulm School of Design.

The university offers three Bachelor's degree programs − Interaction Design, Communication Design and Product Design – and a Master's degree program in Strategic Design.
