= Hochschule für Gestaltung Offenbach am Main =

Art and design university in Offenbach am Main, Germany

Coordinates: 50°06′27″N 8°45′53″E

Offenbach am Main College of Design
- Hochschule für Gestaltung (HfG) Offenbach am Main
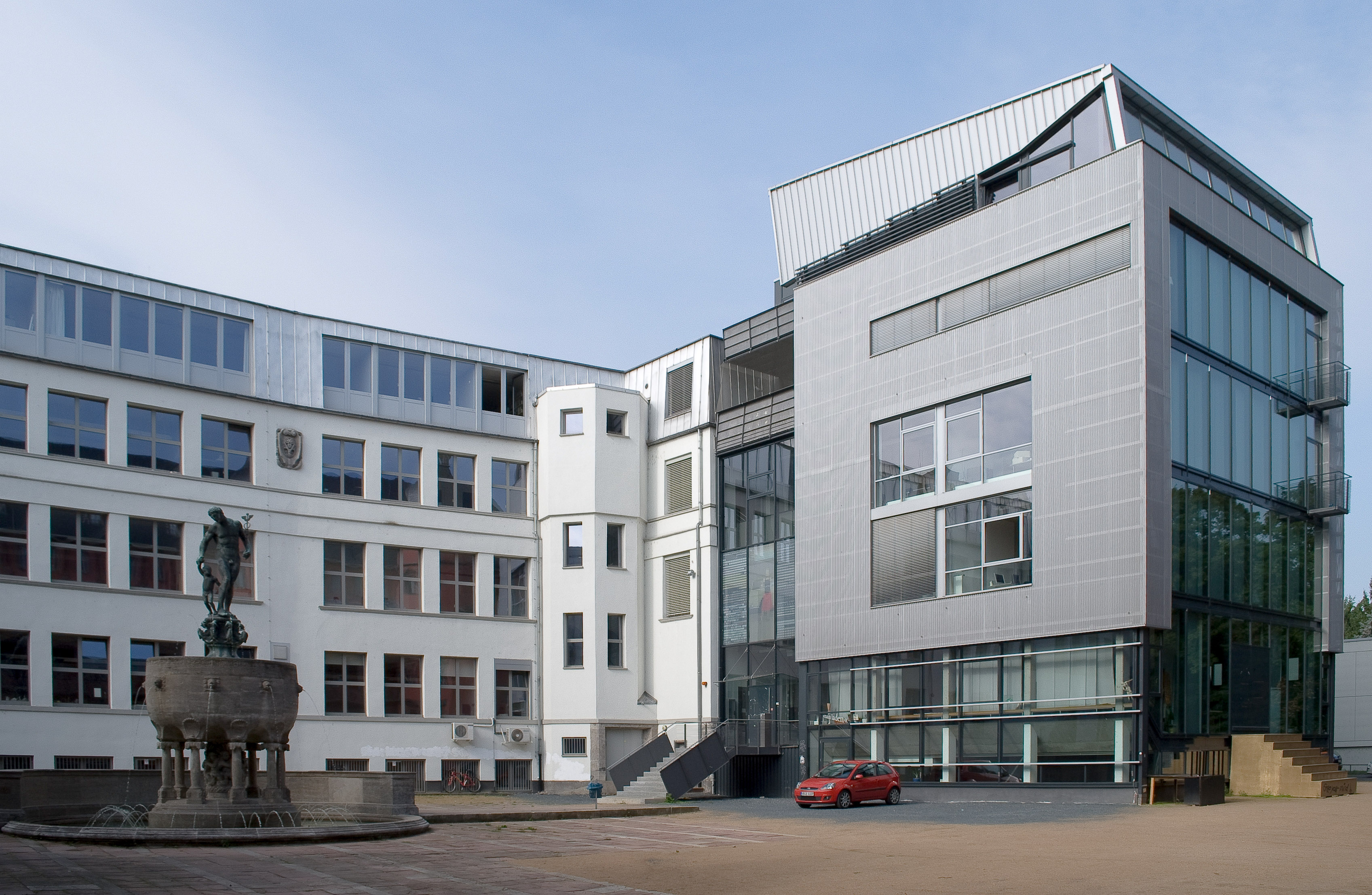
- Type: Public university
- Established: 1832; 194 years ago
- President: Brigitte Franzen
- Administrative staff: 27 (full professors/teacher for special tasks)
- Students: c. 500
- Location: Offenbach am Main, Hesse, Germany
- Campus: Urban
- Website: www.hfg-offenbach.de

The Hochschule für Gestaltung (HfG) Offenbach am Main (English: Offenbach am Main College of Design) is a German art and design university located in Offenbach am Main, in the German state of Hesse. It was given university status in 1970, and founded in 1832.

== About ==
The school is divided into two departments. The degree course offers a choice of different topics: design, art, communication design, media arts, stage design and product design. Additionally, the college offers a one-year (two-semester), project-oriented undergraduate course.

== History ==
HfG Offenbach was founded in 1832 as an Artisan School for Better Training of New Artisans. It soon became an Arts and Crafts School where crafts, artistic and theoretical subjects were taught at the same time. In its enumeration.The cyclopædia of education from 1883 states that the Art-Industry school in Offenbach is notable among European institutions.

In 1970 the Offenbacher Werkkunstschule was transformed into an artistic-scientific university of Hesse. Analogous to its lawful educational obligation to "teach and develop artistic forms and contents" and to "educate the new artistic and artistic-scientific generation", the activity profile of the HfG today encompasses artistic and scientific lecture and research in the diverse fields of visual communication and product design under special consideration of electronic media and newest technologies.

== Notable faculty ==
- Juliane Rebentisch, Philosopher
- Rudolf Koch, Typographer
- Karlgeorg Hoefer, Typographer
- Fritz Kredel, Graphic Designer
- Hermann Zapf, Typographer
- Hugo Eberhardt, Architect
- Dominikus Böhm, Architect
- Max Cetto, Architect
- Adam Jankowski, Artist
- Verner Panton, Industrial Designer
- Klaus Hesse, Graphic Designer
- Burghart Schmidt, Philosopher
- Manfred Stumpf, Digital Artist
- Georg-Christof Bertsch, Designmanager
- Vincenzo Baviera, Sculptor
