= List of Michelin-starred restaurants in Belgium and Luxembourg =

As of the 2026 Michelin Guide, there are 139 restaurants in Belgium and Luxembourg with a Michelin star rating. The Michelin Guides have been published by the French tire company Michelin since 1900. They were designed as a guide to tell drivers about eateries they recommended to visit and to subtly sponsor their tires, by encouraging drivers to use their cars more and therefore need to replace the tires as they wore out. Over time, the stars that were given out became more valuable.

Multiple anonymous Michelin inspectors visit the restaurants several times. They rate the restaurants on five criteria: "quality of products", "mastery of flavor and cooking techniques", "the personality of the chef represented in the dining experience", "value for money", and "consistency between inspectors' visits". Inspectors have at least ten years of expertise and create a list of popular restaurants supported by media reports, reviews, and diner popularity. If they reach a consensus, Michelin awards restaurants from one to three stars based on its evaluation methodology: one star means "high-quality cooking, worth a stop", two stars signify "excellent cooking, worth a detour", and three stars denote "exceptional cuisine, worth a special journey". The stars are not permanent and restaurants are constantly re-evaluated. If the criteria are not met, the restaurant will lose its stars.

== Belgium ==
=== Antwerp ===
Key
1 Michelin star	One Michelin star
2 Michelin stars	Two Michelin stars
3 Michelin stars	Three Michelin stars
—	The restaurant did not receive a star that year
Closed	The restaurant is no longer open

Michelin-starred restaurants
Name	Cuisine	Location	2025	2026
Bistrot du Nord	Traditional	Antwerpen	1 Michelin star	1 Michelin star
Bloesem	Modern	Borgerhout	—	1 Michelin star
The Butcher's Son	Traditional	Antwerpen	1 Michelin star	1 Michelin star
Centpourcent	Modern	Sint-Katelijne-Waver	1 Michelin star	1 Michelin star
De Pastorie	Modern	Lichtaart	1 Michelin star	1 Michelin star
DIM Dining	Asian	Antwerpen	1 Michelin star	Closed
Fine Fleur	Creative	Antwerpen	1 Michelin star	1 Michelin star
Fleur de Lin	Modern	Zele	1 Michelin star	1 Michelin star
Hert	French	Turnhout	1 Michelin star	1 Michelin star
Hertog Jan at Botanic	Creative	Antwerpen	2 Michelin stars	2 Michelin stars
Hof Ter Hulst	French	Hulshout	1 Michelin star	1 Michelin star
Hofke van Bazel	French	Bazel	1 Michelin star	1 Michelin star
Komaf	French	Wommelgem	—	1 Michelin star
Kommilfoo	French	Antwerpen	1 Michelin star	Closed
La Belle	French	Geel	1 Michelin star	1 Michelin star
Le Pristine	Italian	Antwerpen	1 Michelin star	—
Maison Colette	French	Tongerlo	2 Michelin stars	2 Michelin stars
Misera	French	Antwerpen	1 Michelin star	1 Michelin star
Nathan	French	Antwerpen	1 Michelin star	1 Michelin star
Nebo	Contemporary	Antwerpen	1 Michelin star	1 Michelin star
Neon	Country	Lier	1 Michelin star	1 Michelin star
Nuance	Creative	Duffel	2 Michelin stars	2 Michelin stars
Pont neuf	Seafood	Antwerpen	1 Michelin star	1 Michelin star
Sense	Modern French	Waasmunster	1 Michelin star	1 Michelin star
't Fornuis	Classic	Antwerpen	1 Michelin star	1 Michelin star
't Korennaer	Modern	Nieuwkerken-Waas	1 Michelin star	1 Michelin star
't Vlasbloemeken	Modern	Koewacht	1 Michelin star	Closed
Tinèlle	French	Mechelen	1 Michelin star	1 Michelin star
The Jane	Creative	Antwerpen	—	2 Michelin stars
Vintage	Modern	Kontich	—	1 Michelin star
Zilte	Creative	Antwerpen	3 Michelin stars	3 Michelin stars
Reference(s)				

=== Brussels ===
As of the 2026 Michelin Guide, there are 26 restaurants in Brussels with a Michelin star rating.

Key
1 Michelin star	One Michelin star
2 Michelin stars	Two Michelin stars
—	The restaurant did not receive a star that year
Closed	The restaurant is no longer open

Michelin-starred restaurants
Name	Cuisine	Location	2025	2026
Agnes	French	Sint-Martens-Bodegem	—	1 Michelin star
Arenberg			1 Michelin star	Closed
Barge	Organic	Brussels	1 Michelin star	1 Michelin star
Bistro Racine	Modern	Braine-le-Château	1 Michelin star	1 Michelin star
Bozar Restaurant	French	Brussels	2 Michelin stars	2 Michelin stars
Brasserie Julie	Home cooking	Sint-Martens-Bodegem	1 Michelin star	Closed
Centpourcent	Modern	Sint-Katelijne-Waver	1 Michelin star	1 Michelin star
Comme chez Soi	Classic	Brussels	1 Michelin star	1 Michelin star
Couvert Couvert	Creative	Heverlee	1 Michelin star	1 Michelin star
Da Mimmo	Italian	Woluwe-Saint-Lambert	1 Michelin star	1 Michelin star
De Bakermat	French	Ninove	1 Michelin star	1 Michelin star
EED	Modern	Leuven	1 Michelin star	1 Michelin star
Eliane	Creative	Brussels	1 Michelin star	1 Michelin star
EssenCiel	Contemporary	Leuven	1 Michelin star	1 Michelin star
EST	French	Heverlee	—	1 Michelin star
Humus x Hortense	Creative	Ixelles	1 Michelin star	1 Michelin star
Kamo	Japanese	Ixelles	1 Michelin star	1 Michelin star
Kelderman	Traditional	Aalst	1 Michelin star	1 Michelin star
La Paix	Asian	Anderlecht	2 Michelin stars	2 Michelin stars
La Table-Lasne by Alain Bianchin	Haute	Ohain	—	1 Michelin star
La Table Benjamin Laborie	French	Ohain	1 Michelin star	—
La Villa in the Sky	Creative	Brussels	1 Michelin star	1 Michelin star
La Villa Lorraine by Yves Mattagne	Modern	Brussels	1 Michelin star	—
Le Chalet de la Forêt	Creative	Uccle	2 Michelin stars	2 Michelin stars
Le Pigeon Noir	Country cooking	Uccle	1 Michelin star	—
Maison Alain Bianchin	Creative	Overijse	1 Michelin star	—
Maison Marit	Creative	Overijse	1 Michelin star	1 Michelin star
Menssa	Creative	Woluwe-Saint-Lambert	1 Michelin star	1 Michelin star
Philippe Meyers	French	Braine-l'Alleud	1 Michelin star	1 Michelin star
senzAnome	Italian	Brussels	1 Michelin star	—
Sir Kwinten	Modern	Sint-Kwintens-Lennik	2 Michelin stars	2 Michelin stars
Tinèlle	French	Mechelen	1 Michelin star	1 Michelin star
't Stoveke	Modern	Strombeek-Bever	1 Michelin star	1 Michelin star
Reference(s)				

=== Flemish Brabant ===
Key
1 Michelin star	One Michelin star
—	The restaurant did not receive a star that year

Michelin-starred restaurants
Name	Cuisine	Location	2025	2026
Atelier Noun	French	Leefdaal	—	1 Michelin star
Melchior	French	Tienen	1 Michelin star	1 Michelin star
Reference(s)				

=== Ghent ===
Key
1 Michelin star	One Michelin star
2 Michelin stars	Two Michelin stars
—	The restaurant did not receive a star that year
Closed	The restaurant is no longer open

Michelin-starred restaurants
Name	Cuisine	Location	2025	2026
Benoit en Bernard Dewitte	Modern	Ouwegem	1 Michelin star	1 Michelin star
Fleur de Lin	French	Zele	1 Michelin star	1 Michelin star
Hof van Cleve - Floria Van Der Veken	Creative	Kruishoutem	2 Michelin stars	2 Michelin stars
Kelderman	Traditional	Aalst	1 Michelin star	1 Michelin star
Le Julien	French	Lotenhulle	1 Michelin star	1 Michelin star
Moscou by Danny Horseele	French	Ghent	—	1 Michelin star
OAK	World	Ghent	1 Michelin star	1 Michelin star
Publiek	Modern	Ghent	1 Michelin star	1 Michelin star
Sense	French	Waasmunster	1 Michelin star	1 Michelin star
Sensum	Modern	Sint-Denijs-Westrem	1 Michelin star	1 Michelin star
't Vlasbloemeken	Modern	Koewacht	1 Michelin star	Closed
Vrijmoed	Creative	Ghent	2 Michelin stars	2 Michelin stars
Reference(s)				

=== Hainaut ===
As of the 2026 Michelin Guide, there are 2 restaurants in Hainaut with a Michelin star rating.

Key
1 Michelin star	One Michelin star
—	The restaurant did not receive a star that year
Closed	The restaurant is no longer open

Michelin-starred restaurants
Name	Cuisine	Location	2025	2026
Adagio & Gusto	French	Charleroi	1 Michelin star	Closed
Au Gré Du Vent	French	Seneffe	1 Michelin star	1 Michelin star
Le Comptoir De Marie	European	Mons	1 Michelin star	Closed
Le Pilori	Belgian/French	Écaussinnes	1 Michelin star	—
Le Prieuré Saint-Géry	French	Beaumont	1 Michelin star	Closed
Les Gourmands	French	Quévy	1 Michelin star	1 Michelin star
Reference(s)				

=== Liège ===
Key
1 Michelin star	One Michelin star

Michelin-starred restaurants
Name	Cuisine	Location	2025	2026
Arabelle Meirlaen	Organic	Marchin	1 Michelin star	1 Michelin star
Héliport Brasserie	French	Liege	1 Michelin star	1 Michelin star
La Roseraie	French	Modave	1 Michelin star	1 Michelin star
Le Coq aux Champs	French	Soheit-Tinlot	1 Michelin star	1 Michelin star
Le Roannay	French	Francorchamps	1 Michelin star	1 Michelin star
Quadras	Creative	Saint Vith	1 Michelin star	1 Michelin star
Philippe Fauchet	Creative	Saint-Georges-sur-Meuse	1 Michelin star	1 Michelin star
¡Toma!	Creative	Liege	1 Michelin star	1 Michelin star
Un Max de Goût	Modern	Comblain-au-Pont	1 Michelin star	1 Michelin star
Zur Post	Modern	Saint Vith	1 Michelin star	1 Michelin star
Reference(s)				

=== Limburg ===
As of the 2026 Michelin Guide, there are 13 restaurants in Limburg with a Michelin star rating.

Key
1 Michelin star	One Michelin star
2 Michelin stars	Two Michelin stars
—	The restaurant did not receive a star that year

Michelin-starred restaurants
Name	Cuisine	Location	2025	2026
Alter	Creative	Tongeren	1 Michelin star	1 Michelin star
Aurum by Gary Kirchens	Modern	Ordingen	1 Michelin star	—
Cuchara	Creative	Lommel	2 Michelin stars	2 Michelin stars
De Kristalijn	French	Genk	1 Michelin star	1 Michelin star
De Mijlpaal	Creative	Tongeren	1 Michelin star	1 Michelin star
Hoeve De Bies	French	St-Martens-Voeren	1 Michelin star	1 Michelin star
Hostellerie Vivendum	Modern	Dilsen	1 Michelin star	1 Michelin star
Innesto	Creative	Zonhoven	1 Michelin star	1 Michelin star
JER	Modern	Hasselt	1 Michelin star	1 Michelin star
La Botte	Italian	Genk	1 Michelin star	1 Michelin star
Magis	Modern	Tongeren	1 Michelin star	1 Michelin star
Modest	French	Opglabbeek	1 Michelin star	1 Michelin star
Ogst	French	Hasselt	1 Michelin star	1 Michelin star
Ralf Berendsen	Creative	Neerharen	2 Michelin stars	—
Slagmolen	Traditional	Opglabbeek	2 Michelin stars	2 Michelin stars
References				

=== Belgian Luxembourg ===
Key
1 Michelin star	One Michelin star
2 Michelin stars	Two Michelin stars
Closed	The restaurant is no longer open

Michelin-starred restaurants
Name	Cuisine	Location	2025	2026
Bistrot Blaise	French	Marche-en-Famenne	1 Michelin star	1 Michelin star
La Grappe d'Or	French	Arlon	1 Michelin star	1 Michelin star
La Table de Manon	French	Grandhan	1 Michelin star	Closed
La Table de Maxime	Modern	Our	2 Michelin stars	2 Michelin stars
Le Cor de Chasse	Creative	Wéris	1 Michelin star	1 Michelin star
Le Gastronome	Contemporary	Paliseul	1 Michelin star	1 Michelin star
Le Grand Verre	French	Durbuy	1 Michelin star	1 Michelin star
Les Pieds dans le Plat	Classic	Marenne	1 Michelin star	1 Michelin star
Reference(s)				

=== Namur ===
As of the 2025 Michelin Guide, there are 10 restaurants in Namur with a Michelin star rating.

Key
1 Michelin star	One Michelin star
2 Michelin stars	Two Michelin stars
Closed	The restaurant is no longer open

Michelin-starred restaurants
Name	Cuisine	Location	2025	2026
Arden	French	Villers-sur-Lesse	1 Michelin star	1 Michelin star
Attablez-vous	French	Namur	1 Michelin star	1 Michelin star
Chai Gourmand	Modern	Beuzet	1 Michelin star	1 Michelin star
Hostellerie Gilain	Modern	Sorinnes	1 Michelin star	Closed
L'air du temps	Creative	Liernu	2 Michelin stars	2 Michelin stars
L'Eau Vive	Modern	Arbre	2 Michelin stars	2 Michelin stars
La Grange d'Hamois	Modern	Emptinne	1 Michelin star	1 Michelin star
Le Beau Rivage by Curtis	Modern	Dave	1 Michelin star	1 Michelin star
l'Essentiel	French	Temploux	1 Michelin star	1 Michelin star
Pré de chez vous	Modern	Bouge	1 Michelin star	1 Michelin star
Reference(s)				

=== Saint-Ghislain ===
Key
1 Michelin star	One Michelin star
2 Michelin stars	Two Michelin stars
—	The restaurant did not receive a star that year
Closed	The restaurant is no longer open

Michelin-starred restaurants
Name	Cuisine	Location	2025	2026
d'Eugénie à Emilie	French	Baudour	2 Michelin stars	2 Michelin stars
l'Impératif d'Éole	French	Écaussinnes-Lalain	1 Michelin star	1 Michelin star
Le Vieux Château	Modern	Flobecq	1 Michelin star	1 Michelin star
Les Gourmands	Classic	Blaregnies	1 Michelin star	1 Michelin star
Lettres Gourmandes	French	Montignies-Saint-Christophe	1 Michelin star	Closed
Quai n°4	Modern	Ath	1 Michelin star	1 Michelin star
Vicomté	French	Roucourt	1 Michelin star	1 Michelin star
Reference(s)				

=== Walloon Brabant ===
As of the 2026 Michelin Guide, there are 4 restaurants in Walloon Brabant with a Michelin star rating.

Key
1 Michelin star	One Michelin star
—	The restaurant did not receive a star that year

Michelin-starred restaurants
Name	Cuisine	Location	2025	2026
Aux petits oignons	French	Jodoigne	1 Michelin star	1 Michelin star
Bistro Racine	Modern	Braine-le-Château	1 Michelin star	1 Michelin star
La Table Benjamin Laborie	French	Ohain	1 Michelin star	—
Maison Marit	French	Braine-l'Alleud	1 Michelin star	1 Michelin star
Philippe Meyers	Modern	Braine-l'Alleud	1 Michelin star	1 Michelin star
Reference(s)				

=== West Flanders ===
Key
1 Michelin star	One Michelin star
2 Michelin stars	Two Michelin stars
3 Michelin stars	Three Michelin stars
—	The restaurant did not receive a star that year
Closed	The restaurant is no longer open

Michelin-starred restaurants
Name	Cuisine	Location	2025	2026
Bar Bulot Zedelgem	Classic	Zedelgem	1 Michelin star	—
Bartholomeus	Modern	Heist	2 Michelin stars	2 Michelin stars
Boo Raan	Thai	Knokke	1 Michelin star	1 Michelin star
Boury	Creative French	Roeselare	3 Michelin stars	3 Michelin stars
Carcasse	Meat and Grills	Sint-Idesbald	1 Michelin star	1 Michelin star
Castor	Modern French	Beveren-Leie	2 Michelin stars	2 Michelin stars
Cuines 33	Creative	Knokke	1 Michelin star	2 Michelin stars
De Jonkman	Creative	Sint-Kruis	2 Michelin stars	2 Michelin stars
De Zuidkant	Modern	Damme	1 Michelin star	1 Michelin star
Goffin	Modern	Sint-Kruis	1 Michelin star	1 Michelin star
HAUT	French	Oostende	1 Michelin star	1 Michelin star
Hostellerie St-Nicolas	Creative	Elverdinge	1 Michelin star	1 Michelin star
L'Envie	French	Sint-Denijs	1 Michelin star	1 Michelin star
La Durée	Creative	Izegem	2 Michelin stars	Closed
Mémoire	Modern French	Brugge	1 Michelin star	Closed
Rebelle	Modern	Marke	1 Michelin star	1 Michelin star
Sans Cravate	French	Brugge	1 Michelin star	1 Michelin star
Sel Gris	Creative	Knokke	1 Michelin star	1 Michelin star
Sensum	Modern	Sint-Denijs-Westrem	1 Michelin star	1 Michelin star
Subtiel	Classic	De Panne	—	1 Michelin star
Table d'Amis	Modern French	Kortrijk	1 Michelin star	Closed
Vol-Ver	Modern	Marke	1 Michelin star	1 Michelin star
Willem Hiele	Creative	Oudenburg	1 Michelin star	1 Michelin star
Zet' Joe by Geert Van Hecke	French	Brugge	1 Michelin star	1 Michelin star
Reference(s)				

== Luxembourg ==
As of the 2026 Michelin Guide, there are 12 restaurants in Luxembourg with a Michelin star rating.

Key
1 Michelin star	One Michelin star
2 Michelin stars	Two Michelin stars
—	The restaurant did not receive a star that year
Closed	The restaurant is no longer open

Michelin-starred restaurants
Name	Cuisine	Location	2024	2025	2026
Apdikt	Creative	Steinfort	1 Michelin star	1 Michelin star	1 Michelin star
Archibald De Prince - Table et Chambres	Creative	Lauterborn	—	1 Michelin star	1 Michelin star
Eden Rose	Modern		1 Michelin star	Closed	
Fani	Italian	Roeser	1 Michelin star	1 Michelin star	1 Michelin star
Fields	Vegetarian	Findel	—	1 Michelin star	1 Michelin star
Grünewald Chef's Table	Modern		—	—	1 Michelin star
Guillou Campagne	French	Schouweiler	1 Michelin star	1 Michelin star	1 Michelin star
La Distillerie	Creative		1 Michelin star	1 Michelin star	Closed
La Villa de Camille et Julien	French		1 Michelin star	Closed	
Le Lys	Modern		—	—	1 Michelin star
Léa Linster	French	Frisange	1 Michelin star	2 Michelin stars	2 Michelin stars
Ma Langue Sourit	Modern	Oetrange	2 Michelin stars	2 Michelin stars	2 Michelin stars
Mosconi	Italian		1 Michelin star	1 Michelin star	1 Michelin star
Ryôdô	Japanese		1 Michelin star	1 Michelin star	1 Michelin star
Reference(s)					
