= Board of education =

Board of directors, board of trustees of a school, local school district, or equivalent

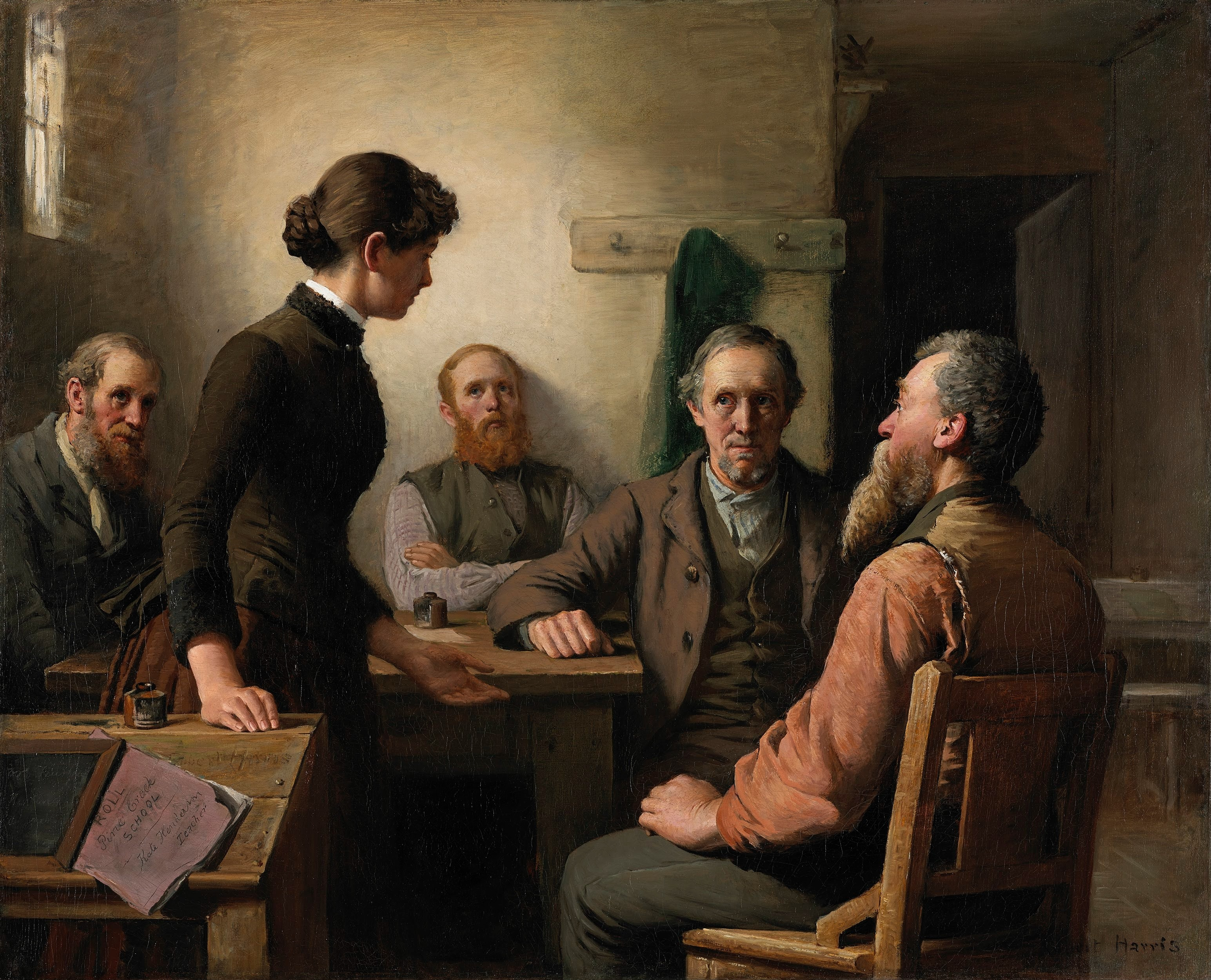
A Meeting of the School Trustees by Robert Harris

A board of education, school committee or school board is the board of directors or board of trustees of a school, local school district or an equivalent institution.

The elected council determines the educational policy in a small regional area, such as a city, county, state, or province. Frequently, a board of directors power with a larger institution, such as a higher government's department of education. The name of such board is also often used to refer to the school system under such board's control.

The government department that administered education in the United Kingdom before the foundation of the Ministry of Education was formerly called the Board of Education.

== Boards of Education in the United States ==
In the United States, boards of education exist at the local, regional, and state level. United States' boards of education have a long history rooted in 'local control' leading the smallest governing board to most often have the biggest say in budget and policy. California has the most local boards of education with 977 and Hawaii has the least with only 1; using the state board of education as the direct governing board of the whole state. Montana has the most boards per amount of students with a board to student ratio of roughly 1:335

== List of United States Boards of Education by State (Alphabetical) ==
- Alabama State Board of Education
- Arizona State Board of Education
- Arkansas State Board of Education
- California State Board of Education
- Colorado State Board of Education
- Connecticut State Board of Education

== List of board of education elections ==
- 2018 San Francisco Board of Education election
- 2022 San Francisco Board of Education recall elections

== See also ==
- Career and technical education
- Education
