= Leticia Márquez-Magaña =

Mexican American biochemist

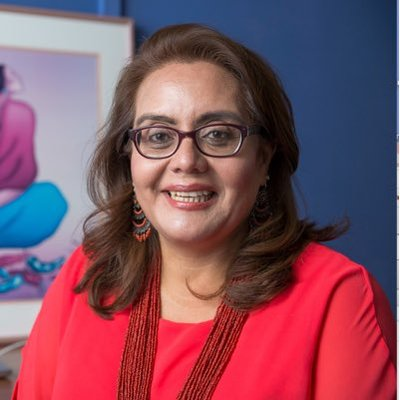
- Born: August 15, 1963; Sacramento, California, U.S.
- Education: Stanford University (BS, MS); UC Berkeley (PhD)
- Known for: Health Equity Research, SF BUILD Director
- Scientific career
- Fields: Biochemistry, Health Equity Research
- Workplaces: San Francisco State University

Dr. Leticia Márquez-Magaña (August 15, 1963) is a Mexican American biochemist, health equity researcher and professor of biology at San Francisco State University. She is the founder of the Health Equity Research (HER) lab at San Francisco State University. Additionally, she serves as the Principal Investigator of the National Institutes of Health (NIH) BUILD award and is the former Director of the SF BUILD (Building Infrastructure Leading to Change) Program at San Francisco State University.

== Early life and education ==
Leticia Márquez-Magaña was born in Sacramento, California, and is the eldest daughter of Lupe and Jesus Márquez. Both are Mexican immigrants. Márquez-Magaña’s father came to the United States (US) as part of the Bracero program and her mother followed once she became pregnant with her. Born to Spanish-speaking parents, Márquez-Magaña began her education in the US as a monolingual Spanish speaker.

As a first-generation student, she was the first in her family to attend college. She completed her Bachelor of Science and Master of Science degrees in biological sciences at Stanford University, followed by a PhD in biochemistry from the University of California, Berkeley. She also completed a Post-doctoral fellowship in molecular pharmacology at the Stanford Medical Center.

== Career ==
In graduate school she studied the genetics of Bacillus subtilis, a soil bacteria. Notable work includes investigating the role of Sigma-D in regulating bacterial motility.

She joined San Francisco State University in 1994 as the first Latina professor in the College of Science and Engineering. Subsequently, she became the first Latina to achieve tenure and be promoted to Full Professor in the College of Science and Engineering at San Francisco State University.

In the early years of her faculty career, she conducted research in bacterial genetics, building on the foundation of her graduate studies. Her work in bacterial genetics was supported by funding from the National Science Foundation, as a pre-doctoral student from 1986-1989, as a recipient of the prestigious CAREER award from 1996-2001, and through 10 years of Research at Undergraduate Institutions grants. As part of this funded research she mentored and trained both undergraduate and master's students. Initially focused on basic science, her research later shifted to exploring cancer health disparities, with an emphasis on the biological factors contributing to these disparities.

In 2007, she founded the Health Equity Research (HER) Lab. As HER Lab director, she focused research on the biological effects of racism and social stressors, particularly in marginalized groups such as African-American and Latina women. The lab examines the health impacts of social phenomena like the "superwoman" stereotype and microaggressions, while exploring countermeasures such as microaffirmations. As the elder director of the HER lab, she is currently engaging in Transformative Research to Address Health Disparities and Advance Health Equity funded by the NIH that explores anti-racist healing through nature as a means of protecting the telomeres of BIPOC Transitional-Aged Youth (TAY).

In 2014, she became the Principal Investigator of SF BUILD (Building Infrastructure Leading to Diversity), a program funded by a $32 million, 10-year grant from the National Institutes of Health (NIH) Common Fund, aimed at enhancing diversity in the biomedical workforce. Her leadership in the SF BUILD project and the Health Equity Research Lab focuses on addressing social disadvantages and the biological effects of racism to reduce health disparities.

She has co-authored over 50 peer-reviewed articles on bacterial genetics, Educational Equity, Institutional Transformation, and Health Equity, as well as a single-author Opinion piece on socially transformative science.

== Honors and awards ==
In 1998, Márquez-Magaña was included on the list of the 100 Most Influential Hispanics published by Hispanic Business Magazine. That same year, her brief biography was also included in Notable Hispanic Women: Book II. In 2001 she was honored with the American Association for the Advancement of Science (AAAS) Mentor Award.

From 2003 to 2005, she served as a member of the National Science Foundation taskforce focused on improving STEM education at Hispanic-Serving Institutions, underscoring her commitment to promoting diversity and inclusion in the scientific community.

In 2013, she was awarded the Bay Area Jefferson Award, recognizing her community service and public contributions. Later that year, she received the Fun Fearless Latina Award and an honorary COVERGIRL recognition, celebrating her influence and achievements as a role model for Latina women.

In 2020, she was the recipient of the Excellence in Professional Achievement Award and the San Francisco State University Distinguished Faculty Award.

In 2023, she was named a AAAS Fellow.
