= 2018 San Francisco Board of Education election =

The 2018 election for the San Francisco Board of Education was held on November 6, 2018, to elect the next three commissioners for the San Francisco Board of Education.

== Background ==
The 2018 San Francisco Board of Education election drew 19 candidates, which was "the most crowded in recent memory" according to San Francisco Chronicle. They originally competed for two seats, with Commissioners Shamann Walton and Hydra Mendoza declining to seek re-election. Walton ran for the District 10 seat on the San Francisco Board of Supervisors while Mendoza opted out for a job with New York State Education Department. Mendoza's last meeting was in the end of September 2018. On October 15, 2018, Mayor of San Francisco London Breed appointed candidate Faauuga Moliga to fill Mendoza's seat for the remaining three months of her term. Moliga was the first Pacific Islander to serve as a citywide official.

Commissioner Emily Murase did not file for reelection in the 2018 San Francisco Board of Education race. This opened up a third seat for the election.

== Candidates ==
- Alison Collins, educator
- Monica Chinchilla, education advocate
- Alida Fisher, member of the SFUSD's Community Advisory Committee for Special Education
- Phillip Marcel House
- Phil Kim, consultant and former teacher at the public charter school KIPP
- Paul Kangas, private investigator
- Connor Krone, founder of a high school financial literacy non-profit
- Lex Leifheit, works at San Francisco Office of Economic and Workforce Development
- Gabriela López, bilingual fourth grade teacher
- Li Miao Lovett, academic counselor at CCSF
- Faauuga Moliga, former school social worker
- Michelle Parker, former president of the district parent–teacher association
- Darron A. Padilla, organization development consultant
- Martin Rawlings-Fein, audiovisual technician and leader at Congregation Sha'ar Zahav, a predominantly LGBT synagogue
- Mia Satya, employment specialist at San Francisco LGBT Community Center
- Roger Sinasohn, writer and technology worker
- Lenette Thompson, firefighter and president of the West Portal Elementary PTA
- John D. Trasviña, former law school dean
- Josephine Zhao, paraprofessional educator

On September 10, 2018, candidate Josephine Zhao withdrew from the race amid the resurfacing of previous racist, homophobic, and transphobic remarks made in Cantonese. Zhao was considered a leading candidate, as she fundraised more than her opponents and had support from many prominent San Francisco political figures. Her withdrawal, however, came after the deadline to withdraw; she still appeared on the ballot, and on October 13 supporters of Zhao canvassed at the district's annual enrollment fair.

== Election ==
=== Endorsements ===
The San Francisco Examiner endorsed Alison Collins, Gabriela López, and Faauuga Moliga. The San Francisco Chronicle endorsed Phil Kim, Michelle Parker, and Alida Fisher. The Bay Area Reporter endorsed Martin Rawlings-Fein, Mia Satya, and Faauuga Moliga. The San Francisco Bay Guardian endorsed Allison Collins, Faauuga Molina, and Li Miao Lovett.

Mayor London Breed endorsed Faauuga Moliga, Michelle Parker, Monica Chinchilla, and Josephine Zhao.

== Results ==
On November 6, 2018, San Francisco residents chose three new members for the Board from among nineteen candidates, with Alison Collins, Gabriela López, and Faauuga Moliga being elected with the most votes.

Lopez became the first bilingual Spanish speaker and youngest woman ever elected to the school board.

2018 San Francisco Board of Education election results
Candidate	Ballots cast	Percentage
Alison Collins	122,865	15.02%
Gabriela López	112,299	13.73%
Faauuga Moliga	107,989	13.2%
Phil Kim	76,017	9.29%
Michelle Parker	65,740	8.04%
Li Miao Lovett	61,412	7.51%
John Trasviña	46,601	5.7%
Alida Fisher	37,735	4.61%
Monica Chinchilla	34,193	4.18%
Lenette Thompson	30,496	3.73%
Josephine Zhao	27,761	3.39%
Mia Satya	17,540	2.14%
Paul Kangas	13,967	1.71%
Martin Rawlings-Fein	12,950	1.58%
Darron A. Padilla	12,439	1.52%
Connor Krone	12,251	1.5%
Roger Sinasohn	12,018	1.47%
Lex Leifheit	9,605	1.17%
Phillip Marcel House	2,491	0.3%
Write-in	1,551	0.19%
Total	817,920	100%
Under votes	282,075	
Over votes	16,041	

== Special appointment to replace Matt Haney ==
Commissioner Matt Haney was elected to the San Francisco Board of Supervisors in the concurrent 2018 San Francisco Board of Supervisors election in November 2018, which allowed Mayor London Breed to appoint his replacement for the remainder of his term. Haney had recommended that either a Chinese or transgender candidate replace him.

On November 14, 2018, the Bay Area Reporter published an editorial pushing for Breed to appoint Mia Satya, who had placed 12th in the election, to the open seat, arguing that "it's time for the mayor to appoint a trans person" due to Breed's previous lack of queer appointees. On January 22, 2019, Breed appointed Jenny Lam to Haney's seat on the board. Lam, who had been the Mayor's education adviser for the prior three months, is a social justice advocate as well as a parent and a second generation Chinese-American. It was Breed's fourth appointment as mayor and brought forth questions of potential conflict of interests between having a commissioner who also is serving as education advisor under the mayor. A similar incident occurred when Mayor Gavin Newsom's education advisor Hydra Mendoza was elected to the Board of Education in 2006. Mendoza later became Mayor Ed Lee's education advisor while remaining on the Board of Education.
