= Lauterborn =

Lauterborn is a German surname. Notable people with the surname include:

- Bill Lauterborn (1879–1965), American baseball player
- Elaine Lauterborn, American politician
- Peter Lauterborn (born 1984), American activist
- Robert Lauterborn (1869–1952), German botanist, limnologist and protozoologist

== See also ==
- Offenbach-Lauterborn, a borough of Offenbach am Main, Germany
