= Huisje Mostinckx =

Coordinates: 50°51′42.3″N 4°12′44.85″E

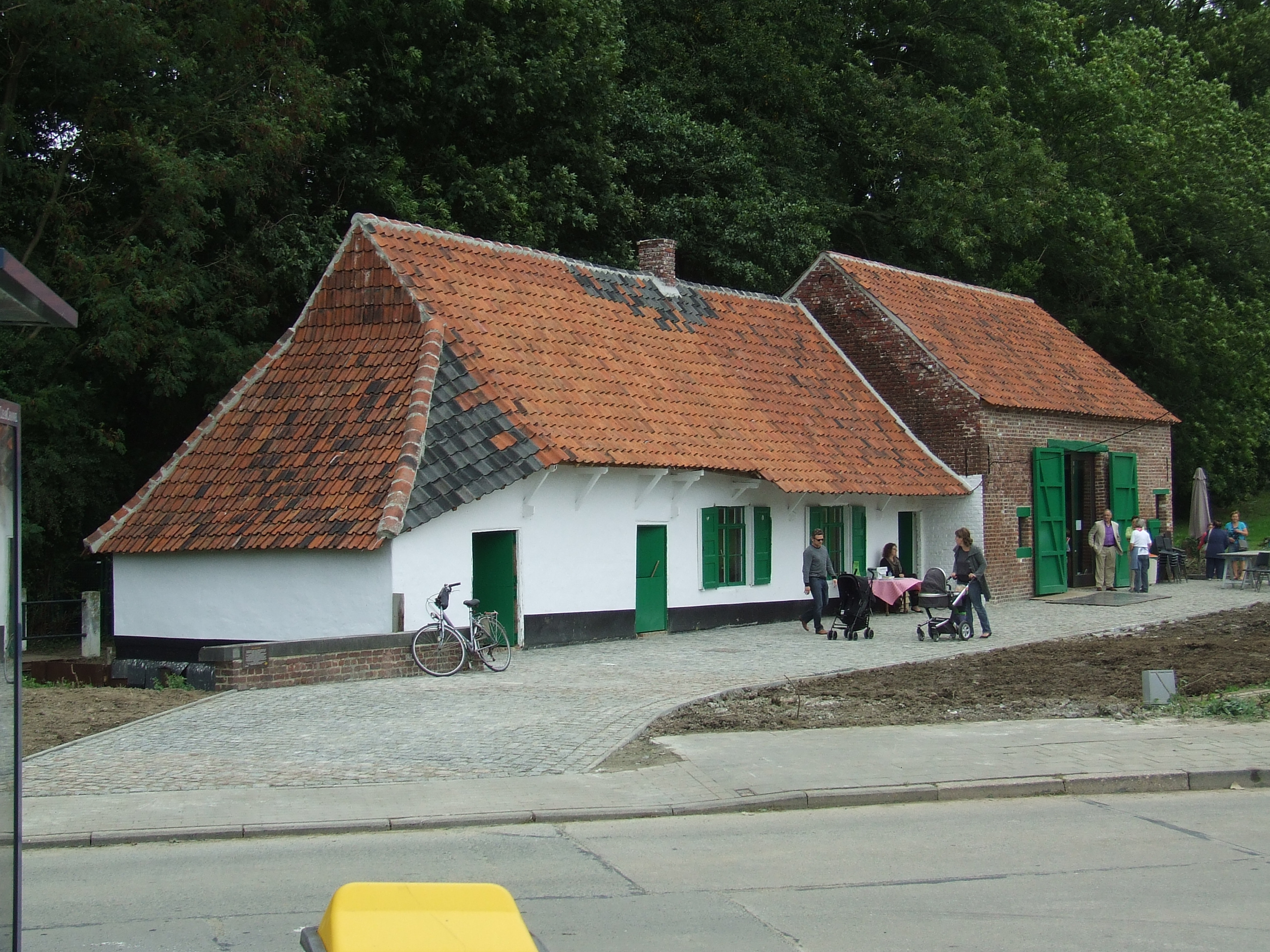
- Huisje Mostinckx
- Interactive map of the Huisje Mostinckx area

General information
- Status: Flemish monument
- Type: Farmhouse
- Location: Dilbeek, Belgium

Design and construction
- Designations: Museum

References
- Flemish monument listing

Huisje Mostinckx (Dutch: house Mostinckx) is a farm on the village square of Sint-Martens-Bodegem, a subdivision of Dilbeek in Flemish Brabant, Belgium. The date of building is unknown, however mentions on the Ferraris maps of Belgium date it prior to 1777. The house is a Flemish protected monument since 1981.

== Name ==
The name of the farm comes from the last people that lived there: Sofie Mostinckx and her husband Karel de Pauw. The house was property of Sofies family. Karel had moved into Bodegem and was quickly called Karel Mostinckx by the locals. It is unknown how long the farm had been within the family, nor how old the farm is.

A first mention of the house dates back to 1556. The Ferraris maps show a farm on the location of huisje Mostinckx. In 1900 the Mostinckx family build a barn connected to the house. The barn currently houses a museum about hop production.

== Building ==
Huisje Mostinckx is a small farm made of loam, as was common in Pajottenland. Most of these farms no longer exist, and the house is protected as a Flemish monument since 1981. To conserve the heritage, the house was restored to its original state. The restoration was completed in 2011 and the house has been open to visitation ever since.

The house was built and restored with loam, as was usual in this area. Loam is naturally present in the soil and also all the other necessary building materials are easy to come by. When a family had more money, they would gradually replace the loam of the weakest walls with stone bricks. Because of this only the front of Huisje Mostinckx is made of loam.

== Gallery ==
Exterior

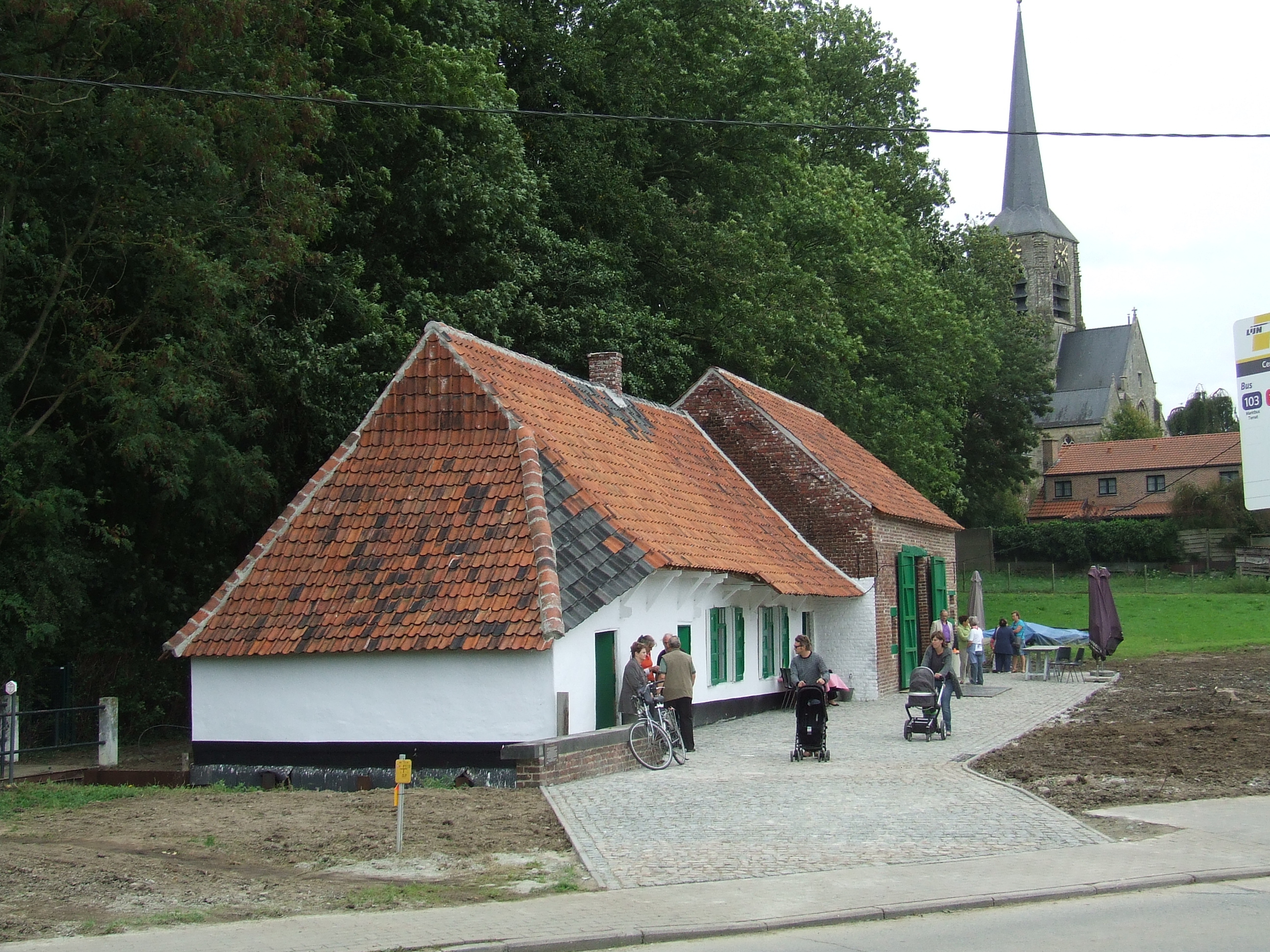

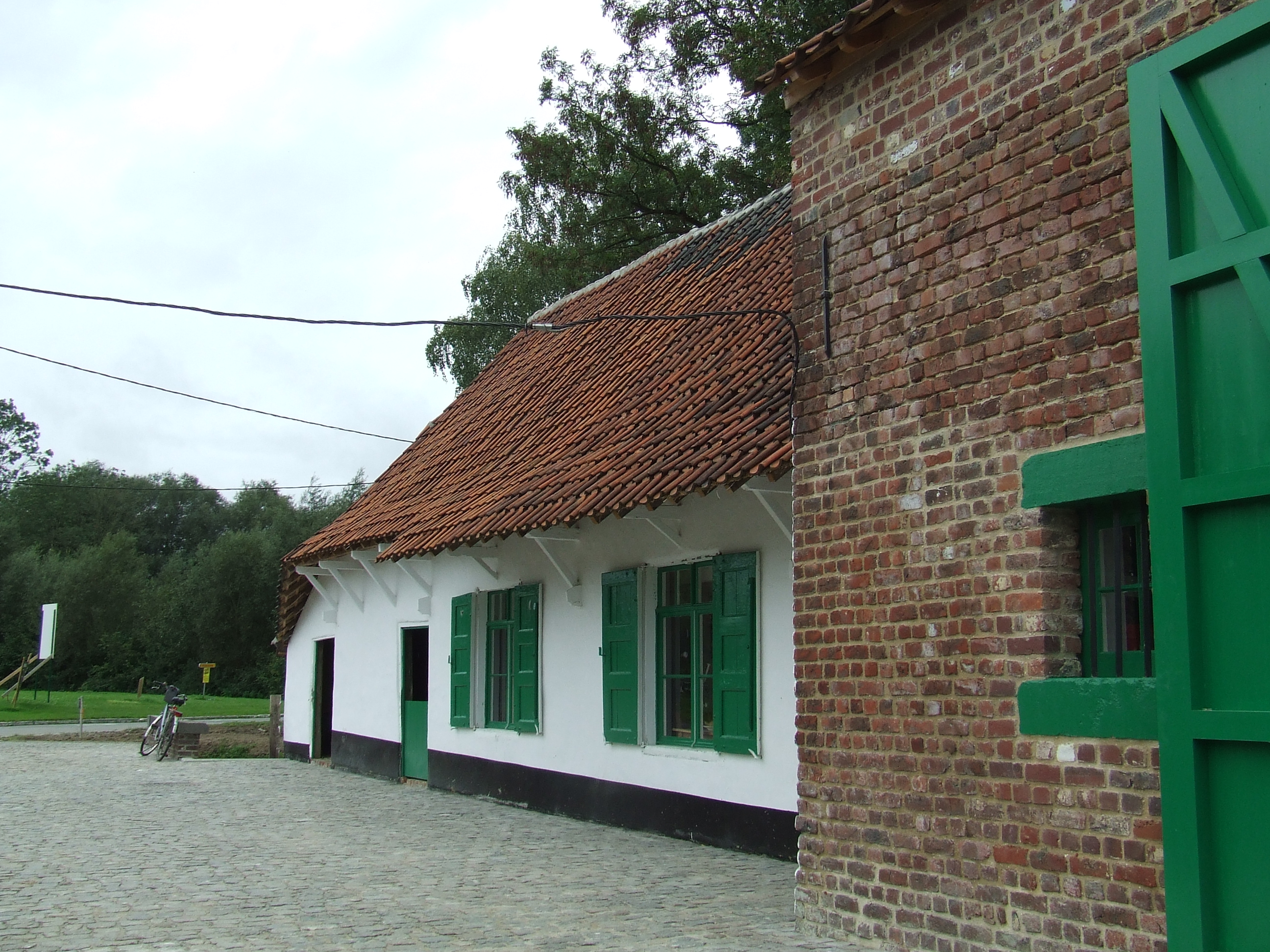

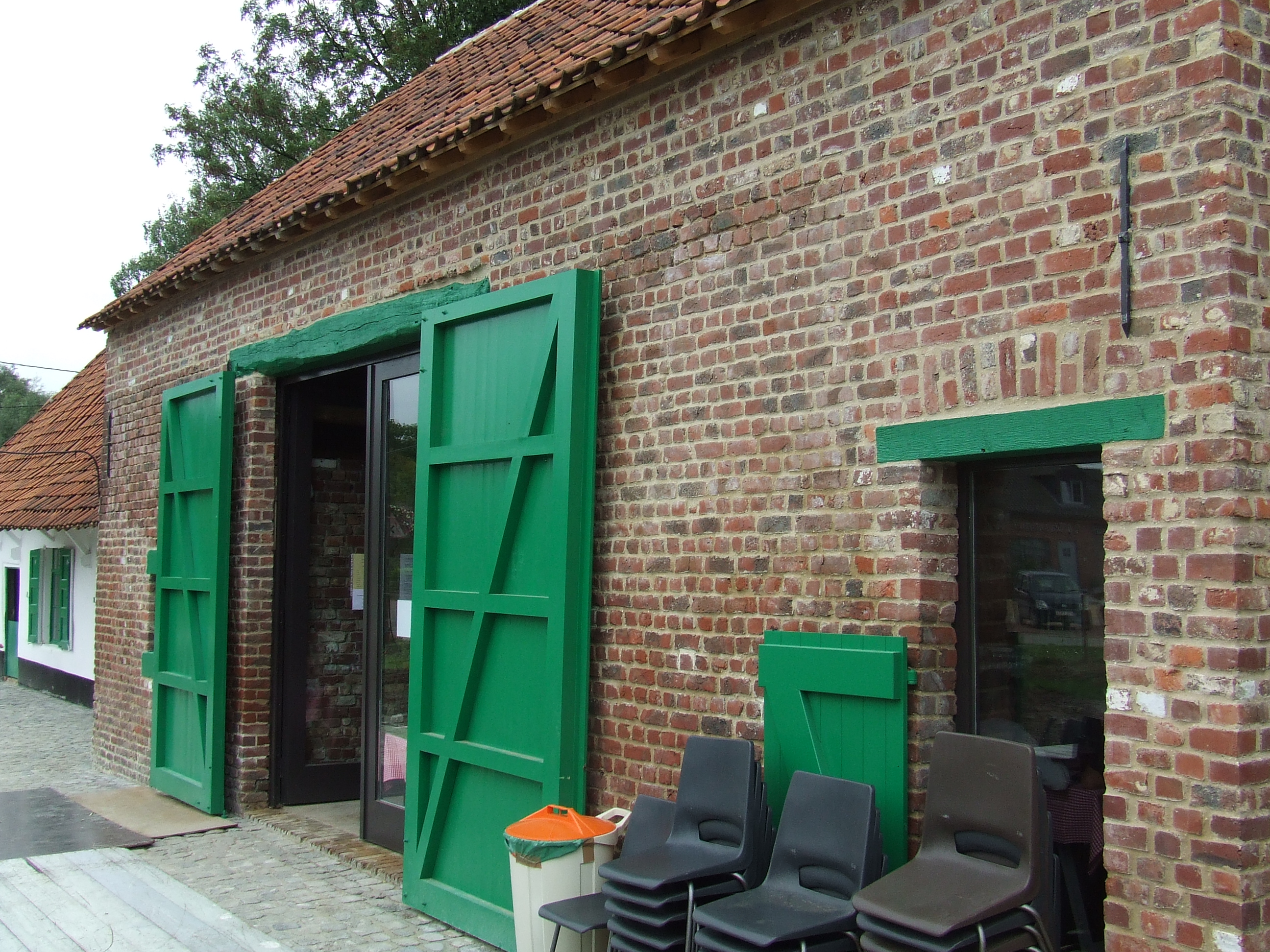

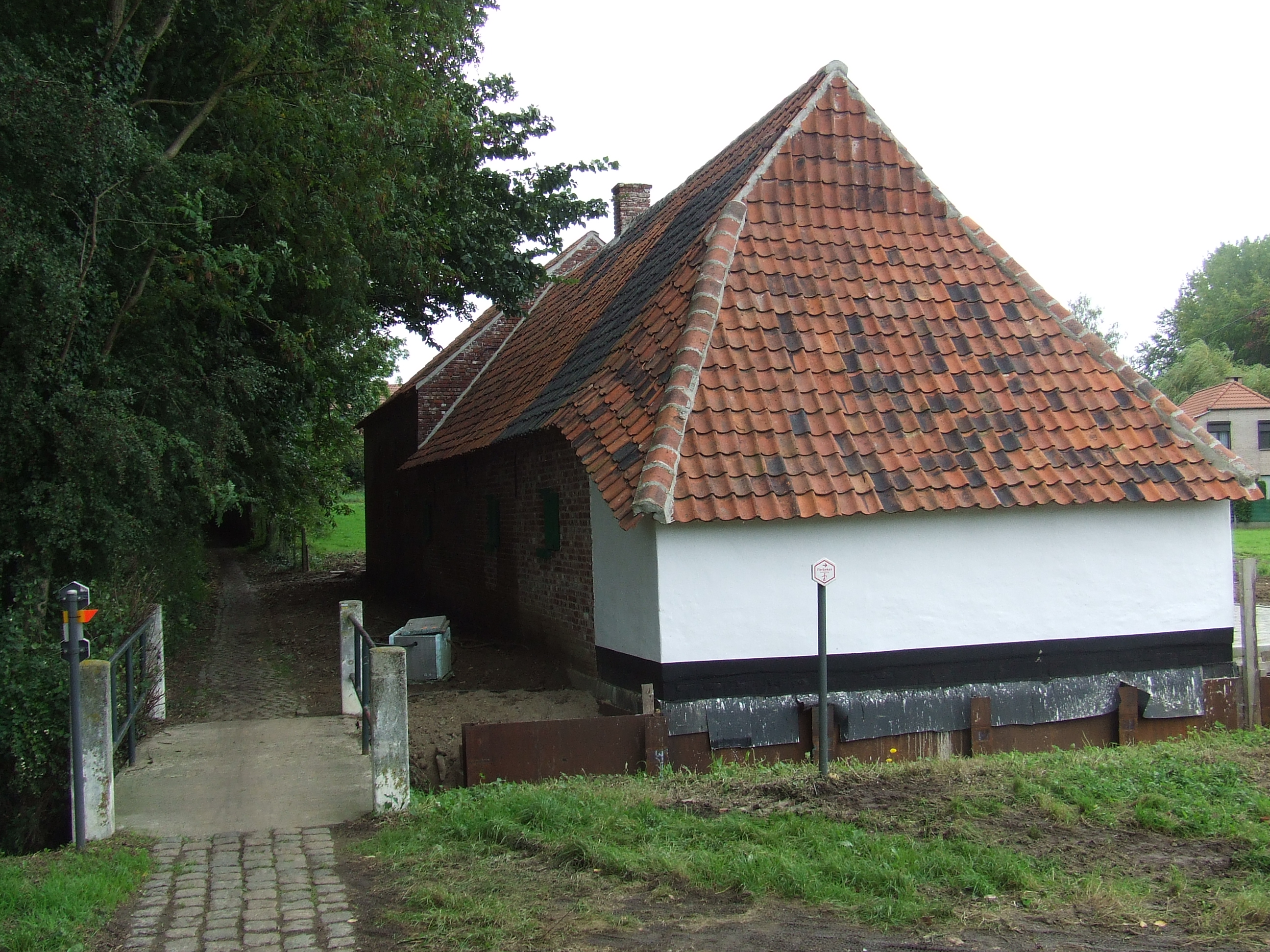
Interior

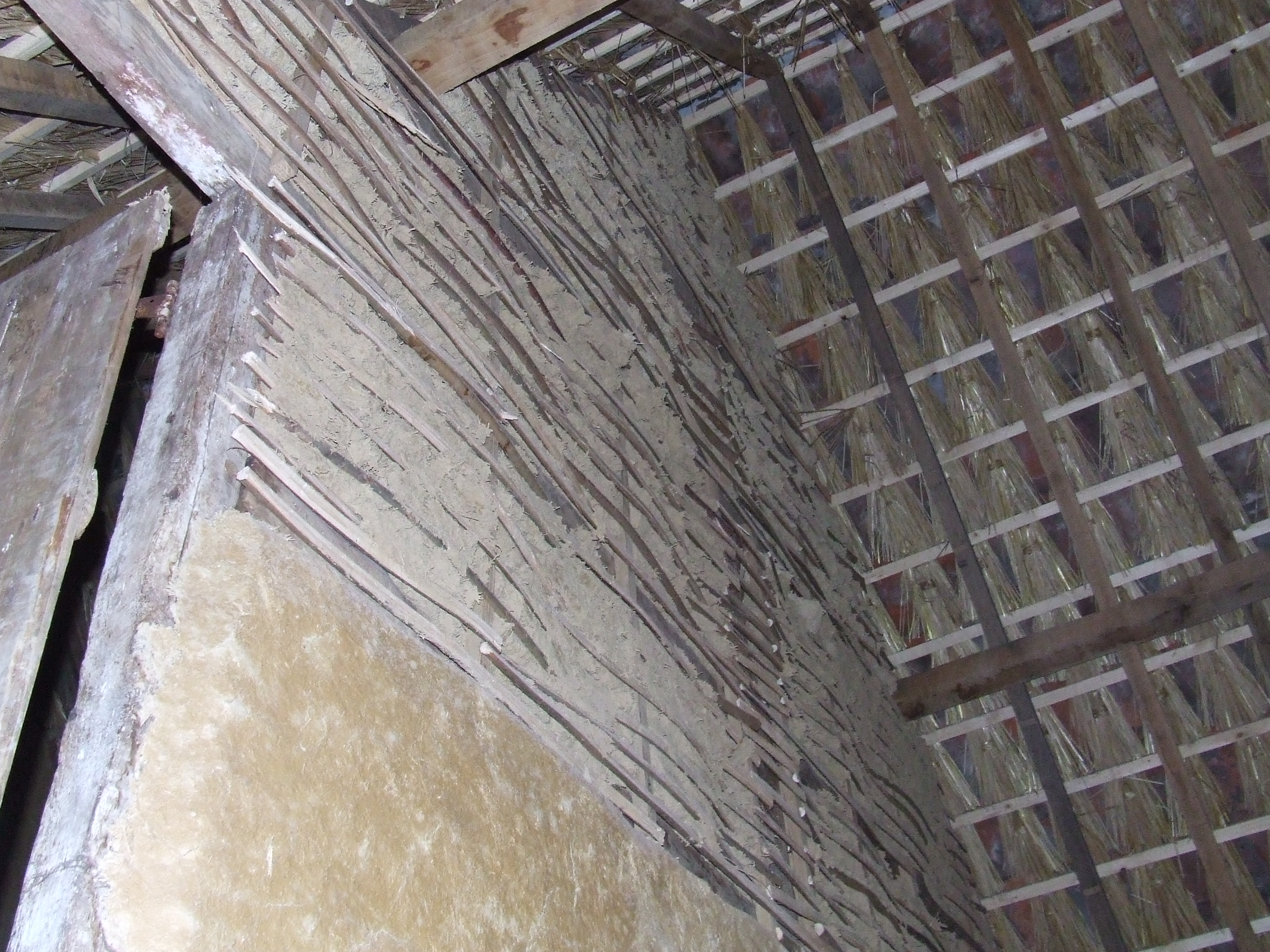

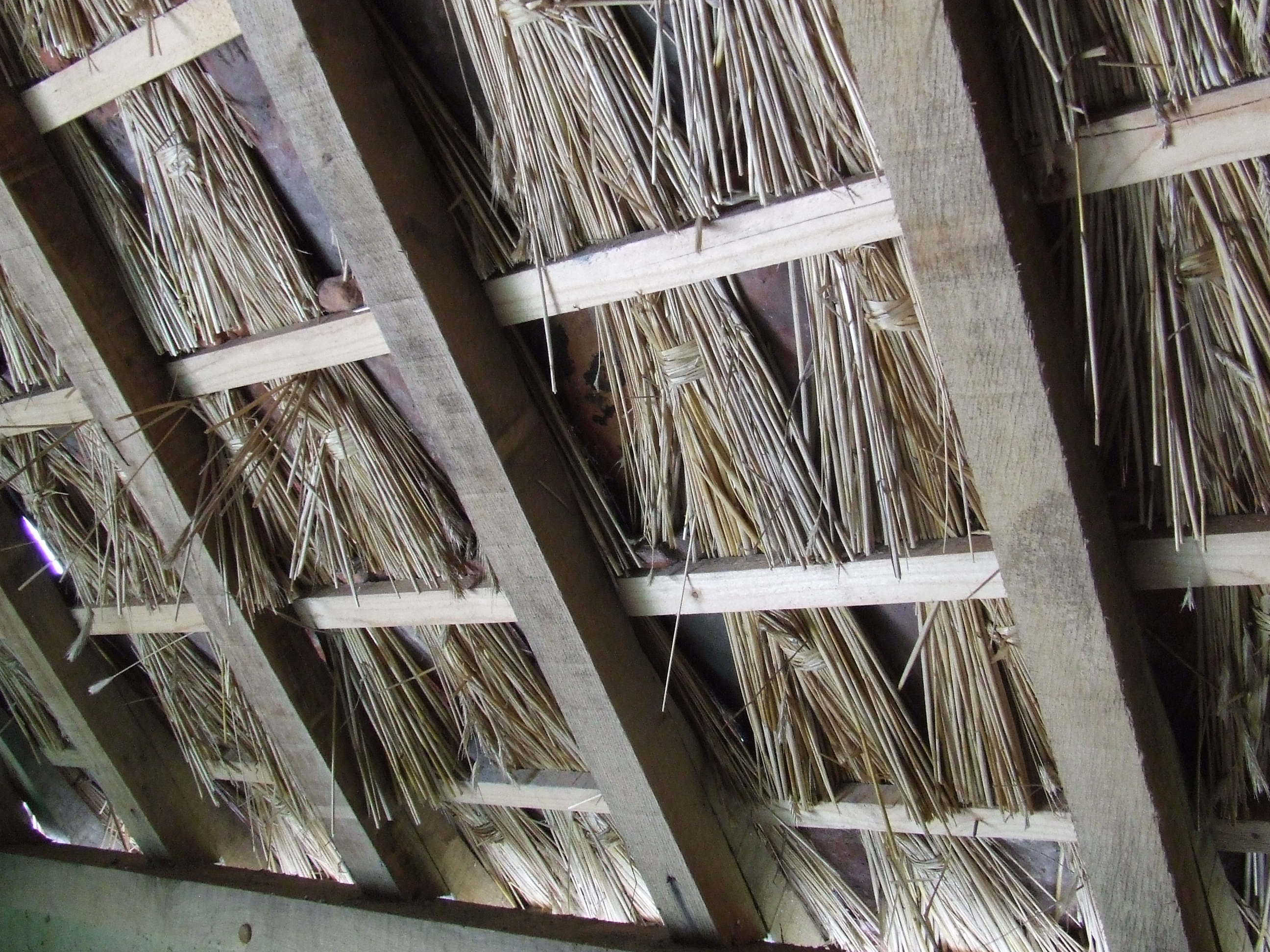

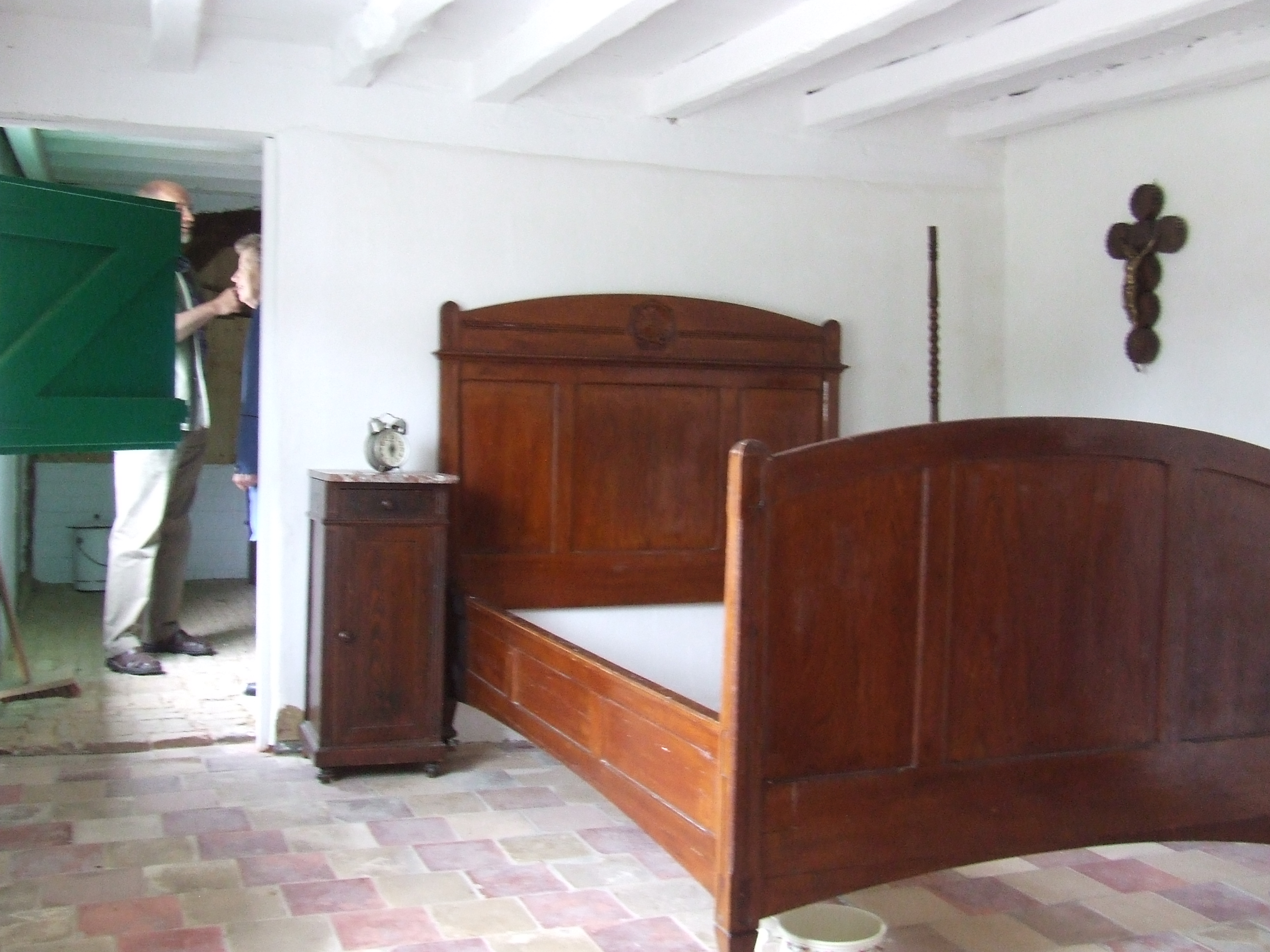

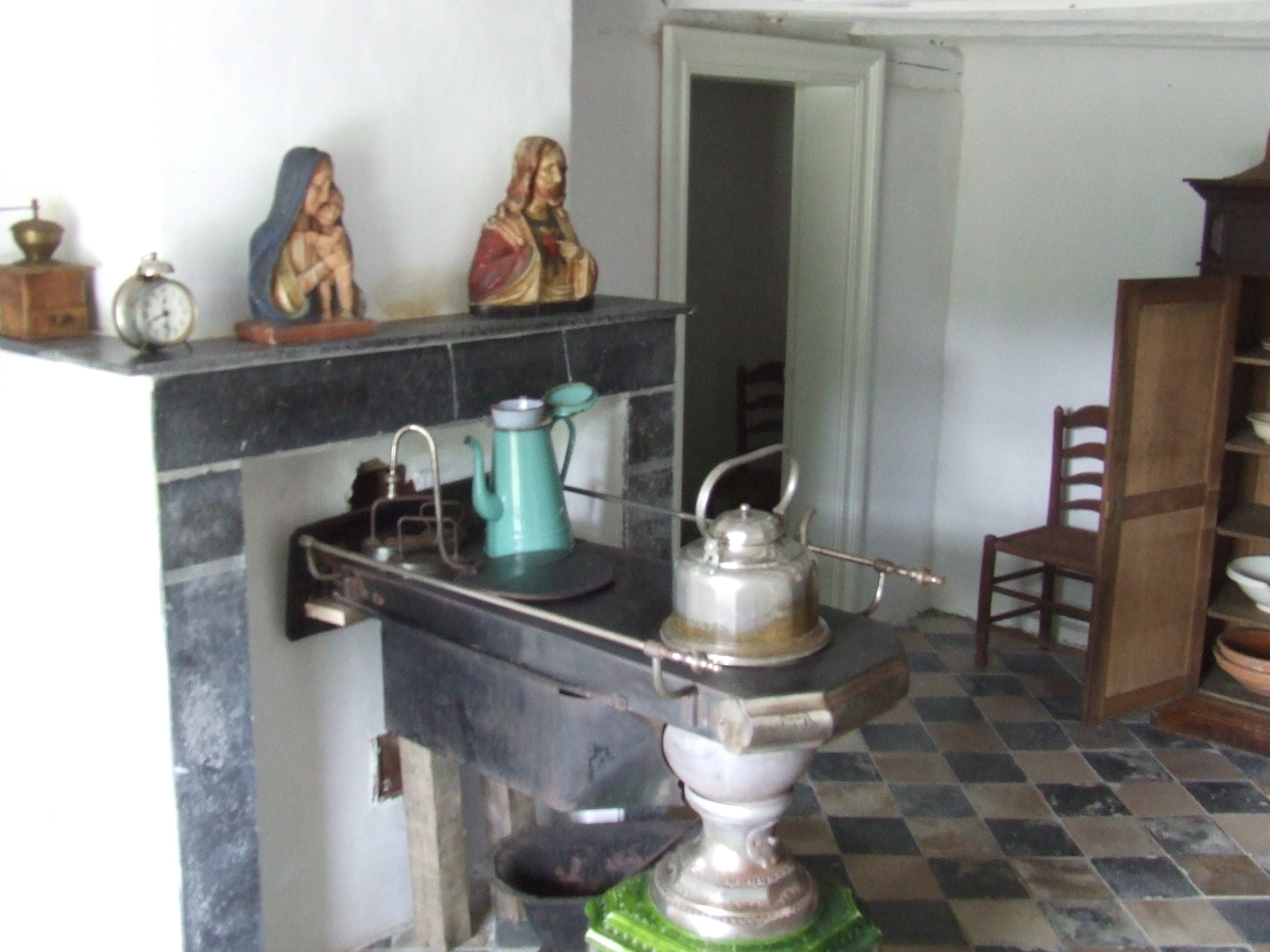

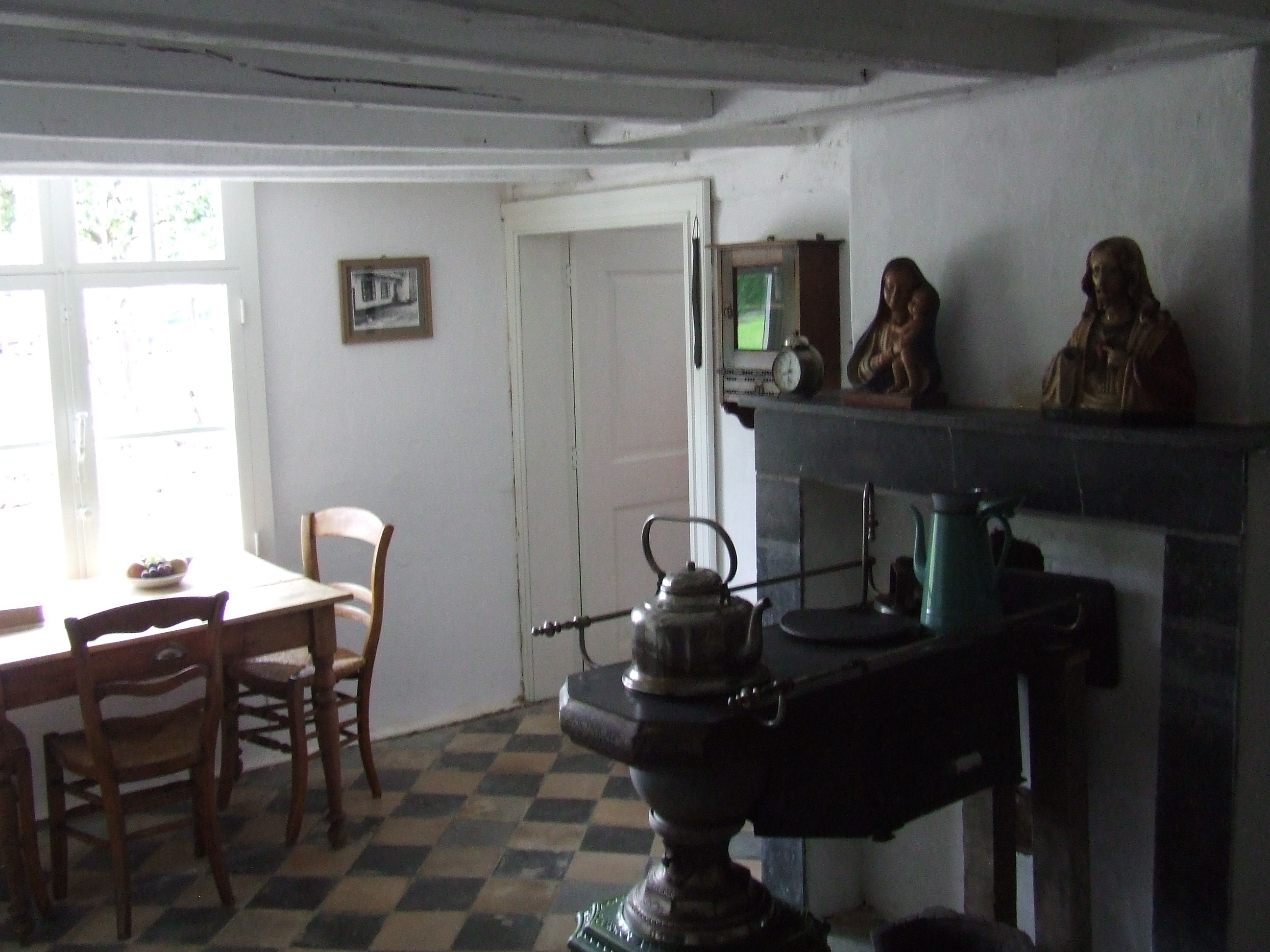

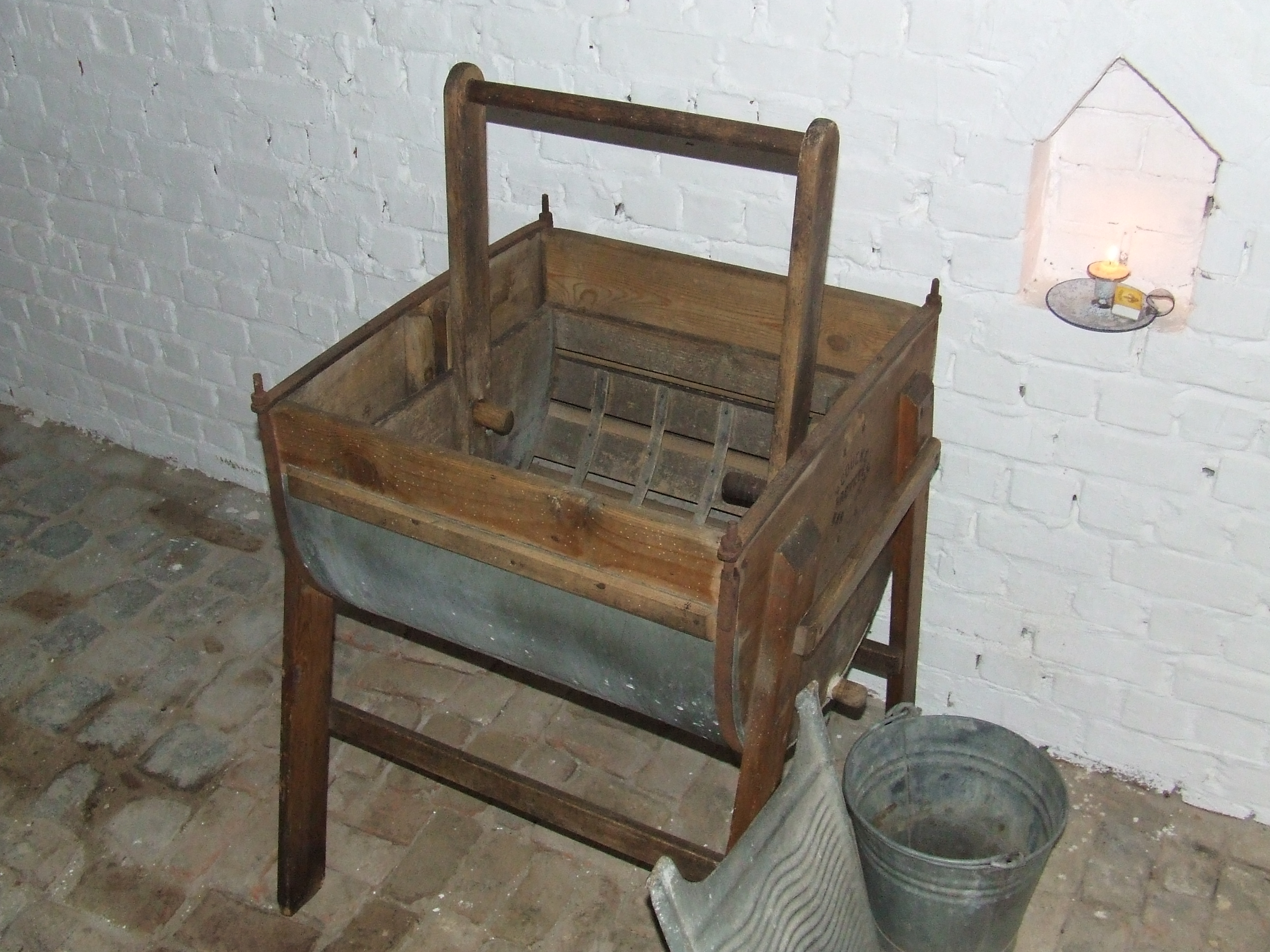

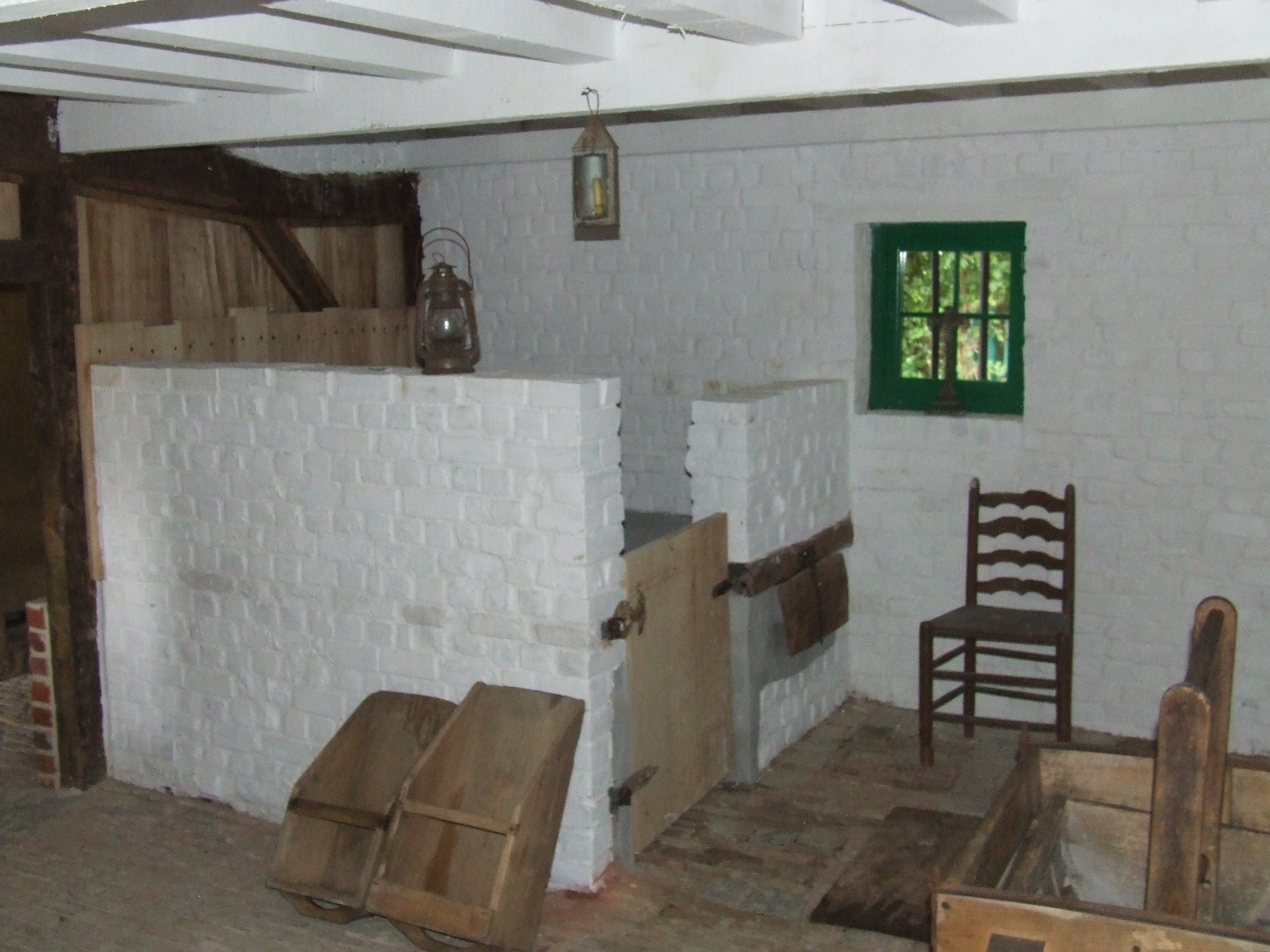
