= Peter Lauterborn =

American musician and activist (born 1984)

Peter George Lauterborn (born October 23, 1984) is a government contractor from San Francisco, California. He served on the San Francisco Youth Commission for two one-year terms, from 2003 to 2005. Lauterborn was appointed by Mayors Willie Brown and Gavin Newsom. He is a graduate of San Francisco State University.

== Community Advocacy ==
A major component of Lauterborn's work was directed at improving the San Francisco Unified School District's ability to handle incidents of sexual assault and harassment. This work began with a Youth Commission hearing on the issue on April 1, 2004 and a report a year later. More recently, Lauterborn authored a resolution calling for the creation of a School District Task Force to deal with the issue. The resolution is sponsored by Commissioners Kim-Shree Maufas, Eric Mar, and Hydra Mendoza.

In 2005, Lauterborn authored a Youth Commission resolution calling for Mayor Gavin Newsom to create a task force to support transitional youth. Newsom agreed and has touted the task force throughout his reelection campaign. Lauterborn worked with a large community coalition to fight fare increases on San Francisco Municipal Railway, which is San Francisco's primary transportation system. Lauterborn argued that the fares would unjustly affect youth who have no other options than public transportation.

== Political Activity ==
On October 23, 2007, Peter Lauterborn celebrated his 23rd birthday by filling his initial papers to run as a candidate for the San Francisco School Board. Lauterborn was joined by the School Board's past-president Eric Mar and Community College Board candidate Chris Jackson.

Lauterborn was a candidate for the San Francisco Democratic County Central Committee in 2012, finishing as the first runner-up in the 19th Assembly District.

In 2014, Lauterborn volunteered as the campaign manager to defeat Proposition L, which sought to roll back several progressive transportation Policies in the City & County of San Francisco.

Lauterborn was also floated as a candidate to replace Supervisor Eric Mar, whom he was serving as a legislative aid, in the 2016 election.
