= Mia Satya =

American community organizer and activist

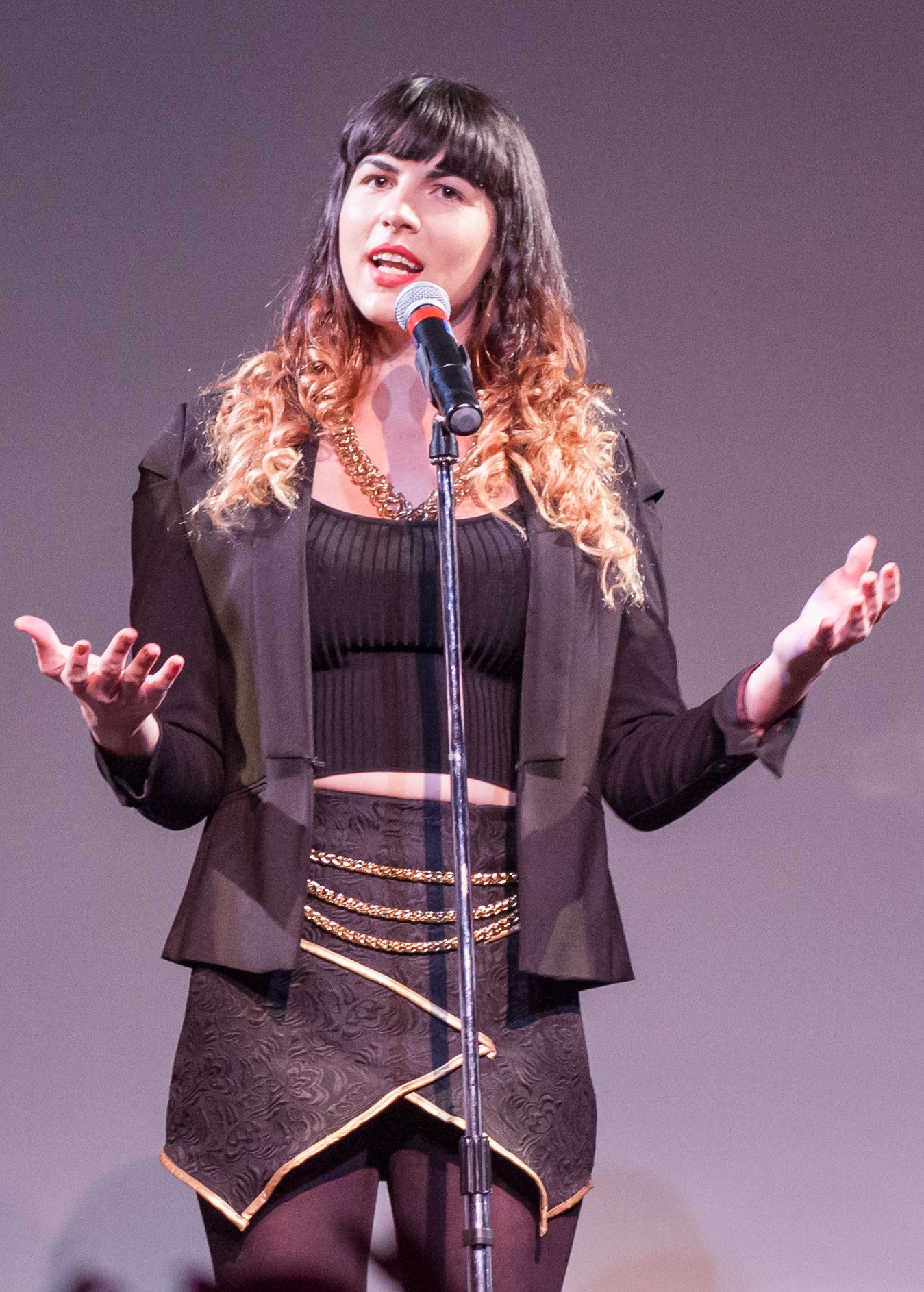
- Speaking at the Transgender Day of Visibility celebration in San Francisco, March 2016
- Born: 1990 or 1991 (age 35–36); Texas, U.S.
- Education: Mills College
- Occupations: Community organizer Activist
- Employer: San Francisco LGBT Center

Mia Satya, also known as Mia Tu Mutch, is an American community organizer and activist for social justice, youth, LGBT and transgender rights. Satya was named a California Woman of the Year by the California State Senate.

== Early life and education ==
Satya was born in Texas to conservative Southern Baptist parents. Being "very visibly queer" and wearing women's clothing beginning in junior high school, she faced bullying and rejection from her classmates and family. At age 17 her parents forced her to come out, sent her to reparative therapy at church, and refused to give her any money for college tuition if she didn't "act straight and act like a man". She left home during her senior year of high school, and hasn't spoken with her parents since.

Satya learned from "conservative relatives" that the city of San Francisco was liberal and gay-friendly, so she made her way there after graduating from high school. Arriving in San Francisco at the age of 19, she was homeless for the better part of two years, and in 2011 became the victim of a hate crime when she was severely beaten for being a trans woman. The search for Satya's attackers was featured in the documentary A Prosecutor's Stand, and she later received an award for her courage in identifying the culprits.

Satya attended classes at City College while looking for work and making connections with the local LGBT community. Satya received a Point Foundation scholarship to study at Mills College. She was among the first class at the women's college that admitted trans women uniformly, rather than on a case-by-case basis. Satya graduated with a bachelor's degree in public policy in May 2016.

== Career and activism ==
Satya began engaging in activism as a child, advocating on behalf of animals, and speaking out against war. In school she organized a Day of Silence to raise awareness of LGBTQ bullying, and was threatened with suspension for it, as the school principal told her it would cause a distraction. Satya got Lambda Legal to intervene and get the school to back down and allow the protest.

After moving to San Francisco, Satya eventually found employment at a Goodwill pop-up store staffed entirely by transgender employees. She later found jobs as a program assistant at the San Francisco LGBT Center, and at the queer youth center LYRIC (Lavender Youth Recreation and Information Center ).

Satya has served on numerous committees for San Francisco city departments. She served for two years on the San Francisco Youth Commission. She worked to enforce an ordinance in the city code that requires departments to provide LGBT sensitivity training "to any employee or volunteer who has direct contact with youth". She also worked to provide free public transportation for low-income youth through the Free Muni program. Satya has also served as director for Transitional Age Youth San Francisco.

In 2013, Satya was featured in What's the T?, a documentary about trans women by Cecilio Asuncion.

In June 2016, Satya served as a community grand marshal for the San Francisco Pride Parade.

Satya served as a delegate to the 2016 Democratic National Convention, where she drew attention to the murders of trans women, and called for a more intersectional understanding of politics. On her way to the convention, she was detained at Reagan National Airport when a body scanner indicated a "groin anomaly", and was subjected to a pat-down and visual inspection of her genitals by the Transportation Security Administration. She was embarrassed and traumatized by the experience, and stated that she would file a complaint.

Satya is the first trans graduate of Emerge California, a political training program for women.

In January 2017, Satya served as emcee for the San Francisco Women's March rally.

As of 2017, Satya is the Lead Employment Specialist for the San Francisco LGBT Center. She also serves a Vice President of External Affairs at the Harvey Milk LGBT Democratic Club and Secretary of San Francisco Young Democrats.

== Honors and recognition ==
- Satya was named a California Woman of the Year by the California State Senate.
- Satya has received Certificates of Honor from the San Francisco Board of Supervisors.
- 2012 – San Francisco District Attorney George Gascón presented Satya with the Justice Award for testifying against her attackers.
- 2012 – Artist Tanya Wischerath added Satya's image to the Clarion Alley Mural Project as part of a tribute to trans women activists.
- 2013 – Satya was included in the inaugural Trans 100 list.
