= Marke, Belgium =

Marke
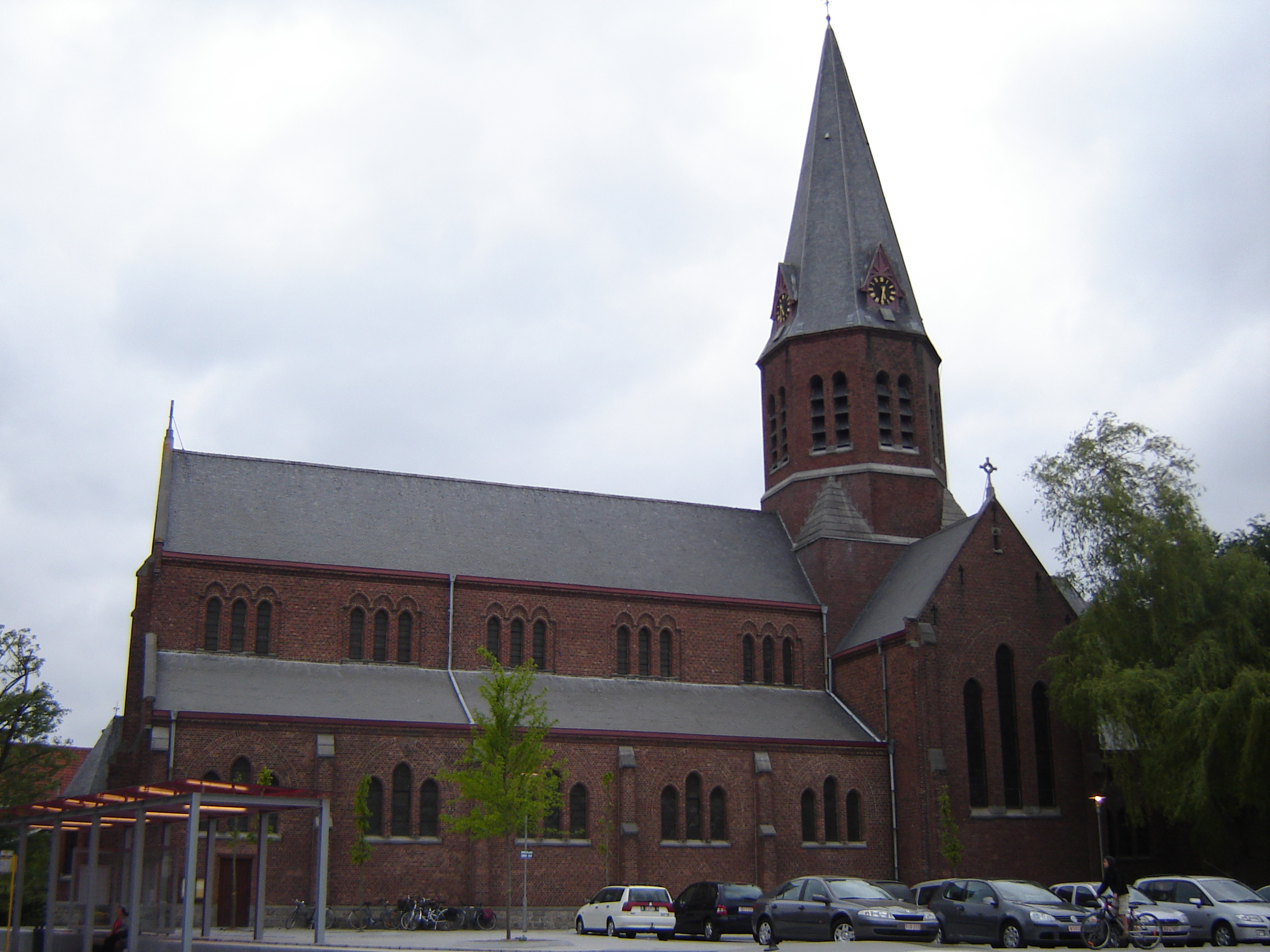
- Church Brice of Tours (Marke)

- Location in Belgium
- Coordinates: 50°48′25″N 3°14′01″E
- Country: Belgium
- Province: West Flanders
- Municipality: Kortrijk

Area
  - Total: 3.132895 sq mi (8.114160 km^{2})

Population (2012)
  - Total: 7,933
  - Density: 2,532/sq mi (977.7/km^{2})
- Time zone: UTC+1 (CET)
  - Summer (DST): UTC+2 (CEST)
- 8510: 8510
- Area code: 056
- Website: www.kortrijk.be

Marke is a submunicipality of the city of Kortrijk, Belgium. It is part of the urban area of this city. As of the 2022 census, it has a population of 7,511. It is the second largest part of Kortrijk.
