= Sint-Martens-Bodegem =

Coordinates: 50°51′42″N 4°12′45″E

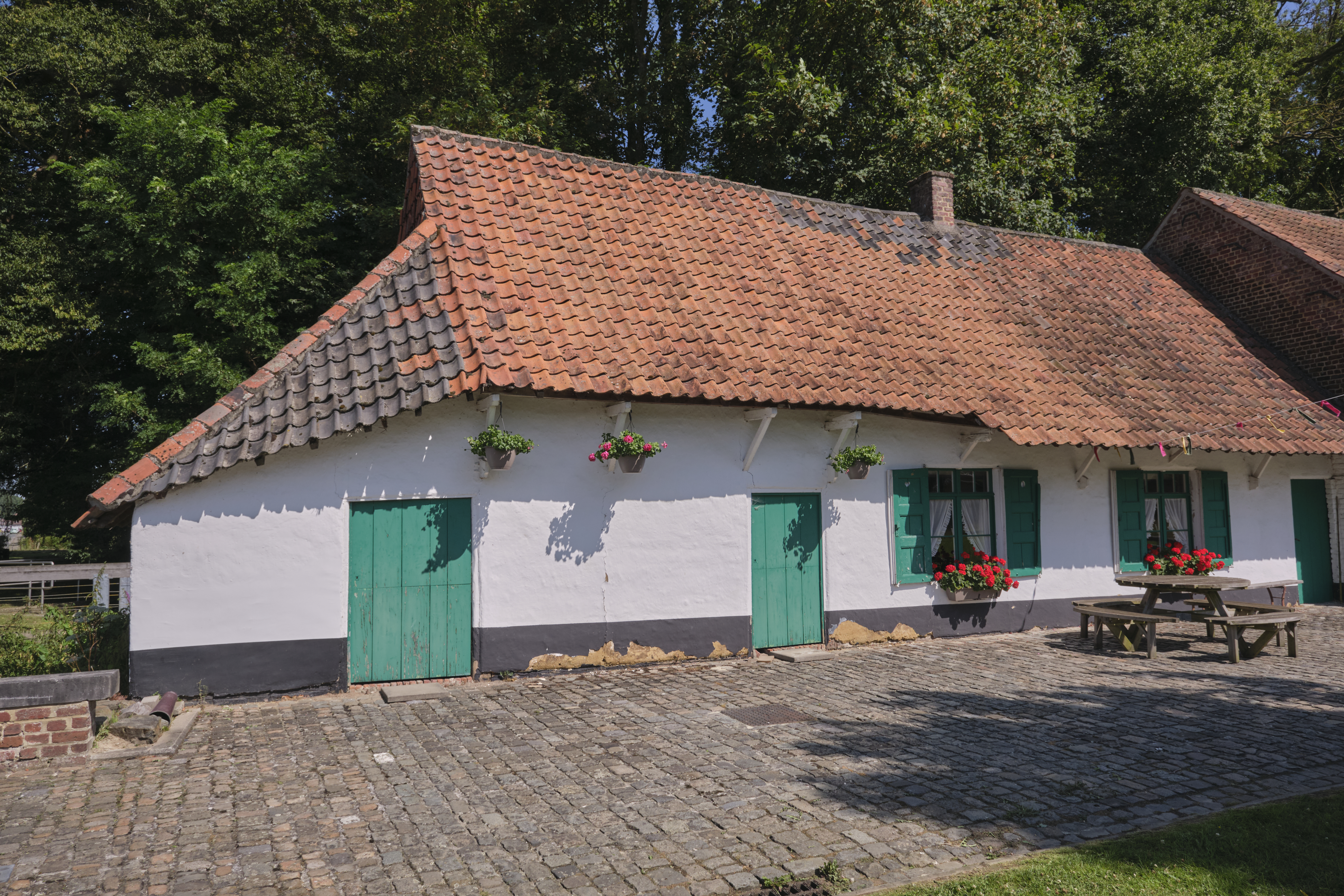
Huisje Mostinckx, a historic dwelling in Sint-Martens-Bodegem

Sint-Martens-Bodegem (locally known as: Beugem) is a historic village that is now part of Dilbeek. It has 2638 inhabitants.

== Toponymy ==
For a long time it was assumed that the mention 'Bodenghem' in the founding charter of the abbey of Affligem applied to Bodegem, but this is nowadays contested because of a possible confusion with the village of Beugem, close to Moorsel. The fact that the nucleus of the settlement was founded very early on can however be linguistically proven (Bodegem < Bodingahaim). Another evidence is the division of the fields around Bodegem, which follows a mansus system, indicating agricultural exploitation in post-Carolingian times.

== History ==
=== Middle Ages ===
During the Middle Ages Bodegem had a dual manor. The manor with lower and middle jurisdiction, including feudal rights over almost all of Bodegem, was a feudatory of the family of Dongelberg. This family was a vassal of the Duke of Brabant. In this manor, the customs in use were those of Sint-Pieters-Leeuw. The village lord bore the title "heer IN Bodegem". He resided in the castle Castelhof.

The Duke of Brabant held the higher jurisdiction, which he loaned to the lord of Gaasbeek from the 13th century on. He bore the title "heer VAN Bodegem". In this manor, law was spoken according to the customs of Leuven. Apart from high jurisdiction, he held manorial rights over a small part of the territory of Bodegem.

The Land Charter of Bodegem, granted in 1279, is one of the oldest charters in the Duchy of Brabant. It states the rights and duties of the lord of the villages.

In 1749, both manors were unified in the Countship of Tirimont.

== Attractions ==
- Sint-Martinus Church: late-gothic church
- Huisje Mostinckx
- Castelhof
