= Transitional age youth =

Human life stage

Transitional age youth (alternatively: TAY, Transition Aged Youth, Transition-Age Youth, Transitional Age Youth, Transitioning Youth, Transitional Youth, and Youth in Transition) can reference both a developmental period and be a descriptor regarding eligibility for certain services. While there are variations in definitions, the age ranges do consistently overlap and include late adolescence (15–16 years of age) to early adulthood (24–26 years). This range is considered a critical period in human development characterized by several changes socially, environmentally, and cognitively. During this time, individuals can experience changes in their social roles and function, family and peer supports, exposure to substance use, educational and vocational programs, as well as changes in healthcare providers from pediatric to adult settings.

== History ==
The phrase transitional aged youth (TAY and the variations listed above) originated in the foster care system but has since taken on broad applicability to other (primarily healthcare) sectors. Specifically, youth "in transition" can refer to "aging out" or being ineligible for pediatric health care services after turning 18 years old, or being ineligible for children's mental health services at 18 years old in certain places. The adult outcomes for youth involved in various child-serving systems (special education, pediatric primary care, child and adolescent mental health, child welfare, and juvenile justice) came under scrutiny in the 1980s. As a result, planning around the transition from child to adult services became a focus across many systems. In mental health systems, the term transitional aged youth (TAY) has historically been associated with youth and young adults at high risk of poor transition outcomes due to complex needs, lack of a support system, and multiple challenges. Earlier studies on young adult outcomes used the term to describe individuals from 16 to 25 years old who have, or are at risk of having, Serious Mental Illness (SMI) or Serious Emotional Disturbance (SED), defined as serious emotional or behavioral difficulties that are psychological in origin, in combination with significant functional impairment, and arise by age 18 years. Terminology has since evolved, both in mental health and in federal initiatives. For example, the Substance Abuse and Mental Health Services Administration (SAMHSA) has broadened its scope to include TAY with SED and in the general public, through its Now Is The Time Healthy Transitions program. This expansion likely reflects the growing knowledge that all youth of transition age are at risk for mental health issues, substance abuse disorders, and suicide. Therefore, TAY is being used more often to refer to all individuals within an age range, regardless of presence of SED or service system involvement. Other terms which overlap with TAY include Emerging Adulthood (EA), coined by Arnett who proposes EA as a normal discrete developmental phase for all persons 18–25; Adolescents and Young Adults (AYAs), historically those with cancer but now more generally referring to all health needs of 10-25 year-olds; and Youth and Young Adults (YAYAs). Sometimes, the acquisition of tasks during this developmental phase has been colloquially termed, "adulting".

== Developmental tasks ==
Like many other developmental stages, the period of transition from adolescence to early adulthood is faced with many unique challenges. TAY must consolidate and build upon the tasks that they started in adolescence, including the enrichment of their identity, independence, and relationships. During this period, their bodies begin to reach physical and sexual maturity, while cognitive and psychological development often trail behind. Physically, TAY undergo puberty mediated by sex hormones, including increases in testosterone and estrogen, and begin to develop secondary sex and traditional gender role characteristics. Cognitively, they start to form a moral code, combining aspects of societal expectations and rights as well as universal ethical principles. As they work towards independence, TAY must acquire skills for adulthood, such as learning how to manage finances, housing, and medical and legal decision-making, in order to move away from reliance upon family for basic needs. Smaller steps needed to gain success include learning how to create and maintain a budget, identifying "needs versus wants," and opening a bank account. Legally, many youth will continue to require their guardian's consent/permission for many medical procedures, medications (including psychiatric), and services until they reach the age of majority.

Independence also involves forming and maintaining fulfilling relationships outside of the family unit. As dependence on the family lessens, relationships shift to companionship, support, and intimacy with peers. Friendships become more important as TAY further individualize and psychologically discover who they are. Intimate relationships are often more challenging to develop, and many may not find a partner during this developmental period, as TAY navigate the stresses of biological and hormonal drives, psychological wants for intimacy and acceptance, and weigh potential negatives including parental disapproval, possible pregnancy, sexually transmitted diseases, and peer rejection.

== Population health ==
In 2020, the global population of 15-24 year olds was estimated to be 1.2 billion, accounting for about 15% of the world's total population. The health of adolescents is a critical component of a successful transition to adulthood. This period is marked by significant physical, cognitive, and psychosocial growth, and is an important time for building foundations for good health. While young people are typically seen as healthy, this period can correlate with a rise in health problems, including the emergence of mental health issues. In the last decade, depression, anxiety, and injuries (road injuries, self-harm, and interpersonal violence) were among the top ten causes of death in 10-24 year olds.

=== Factors affecting health ===
There are many factors that can affect the health of this population. As part of normal development, adolescents become increasingly independent and may experiment with adult behaviors that affect future patterns of adult health. Behaviors such as driving, sexual experimentation, tobacco, alcohol, and substance use, and diet and exercise habits can impact health in the short- and long-term. Since 2014, e-cigarettes (or "vaping") have been the most commonly used nicotine product among youth. The high level of use in this population led the U.S. Surgeon General to declare e-cigarette use an epidemic. Concerns about the negative effects of nicotine on the adolescent brain include addiction, impact on learning, memory, and attention, toxic effects on lungs from aerosol, and use of e-cigarettes for marijuana. In addition to substance use, factors that affect health in this population should be considered from a comprehensive perspective and include sexual and reproductive health, HIV and other infectious diseases, nutritional deficiencies, injury and violence, chronic physical health problems, and mental health disorders.

=== Barriers to transition of health care ===
Significant barriers may impact the successful transition from pediatric to adult health care, which in turn can negatively impact health outcomes. Taking responsibility for managing one's own health care can be a struggle for young adults. As youth transition to adulthood, responsibility shifts from the family to the youth. Some youth with pre-existing illnesses might decide that treatment is no longer necessary. The myth of invulnerability and fear of being ill may reduce a young adult's motivation to seek treatment. Young adults who do seek treatment must learn how to obtain health insurance, schedule medical appointments, remember to take medication, and obtain refills. They must acquire these new skills while learning how to balance employment or increased academic demands (for those in college), wellness and social activities, and with decreased support. In some countries, there are financial burdens related to the costs of high-quality healthcare. Finally, transportation issues may impact access to care, and worries about money are also widespread in the young adult population and may limit treatment options.

== Risk factors for mental health disorders ==
The transitional aged youth years coincide with the onset of many mental health conditions. Approximately 75% of serious psychiatric disorders present with symptoms before the age of 25 (i.e., schizophrenia, bipolar disorder, substance use disorders, etc.). Studies have shown that in the "transitional aged brain", a mismatch occurs between the early maturation of the subcortical brain regions, and the delayed maturation of the prefrontal cortex and the white matter tracts connecting them. The subcortical areas, known as the amygdala and nucleus accumbens, influence motivation, passion, pleasure, and aversive experiences, while the prefrontal cortex and connecting white matter tracts are important for attention, emotional and impulse control, flexibility, planning, and judgment. Even with external control and expectations, this group remains at very high risk for morbidity and mortality associated with suicide, substance use, psychiatric illness, and accidents. At the same time that these youth and their maturing brains need more external regulatory support and lower risk environments, they instead have easier access to alcohol and drugs, high-risk social activities, and loss of close parenting and supervision. Exposure to toxins (e.g., drugs, infections, extreme stress, or hypoxia) and trauma ("toxic stress") during childhood and adolescence can also affect adult functioning. For example, adolescent exposure to marijuana may increase the risk of psychosis in vulnerable youths. A growing body of literature implicates Adverse Childhood Experiences, including physical, sexual, and emotional abuse, in a broad range of negative health consequences including depression, anxiety, suicidality, and cardiovascular and immune disease.

== Special subgroups ==
=== Serious mental illness ===
According to the NIMH, in 2019 young adults aged 18–25 years had the highest prevalence of serious mental illness (SMI) (8.6%) compared to adults aged 26–49 years (6.8%) and aged 50 and older (2.9%). TAY with untreated mental health disorders are at high risk for substance abuse, physical assault, and encounters with the correctional system.

=== Foster care ===
Because of the early terminology applied to this population, there is a core body of research related to TAY and youth in foster care. Upwards of 80% of foster youth have developmental, behavioral, or mental health concerns. Foster care alumni have higher rates of mental health disorders than the general population, such as depression, PTSD and substance use disorders. Former foster youth with mental illness often have past trauma histories, such as being a victim of child abuse and neglect, that make it challenging for them to develop and maintain healthy adult relationships. Their mood may easily become dysregulated as a result of insecure attachments. Some researchers have shown that the more placements a child experiences, the higher risk of attachment issues which can lead to a high risk of psychiatric morbidity in adulthood.

Compared to other Medicaid-eligible youth, foster youth have higher rates of behavioral health expenditures. Foster youth are prescribed psychotropic medications at 2-8 times the rate of other Medicaid-eligible youth (GAO, 2011). Foster youth are at risk for inappropriate prescribing because of limited access to youth behavioral health information and history, fragmented and/or inadequately coordinated care, insufficient time for assessment, treatment, and collaboration; un- or misdiagnosed trauma-related conditions, limited access to effective psychosocial and psychiatric treatments, and ineffective advocacy for foster youth.

The prime importance of developing treatment approaches to engage and maintain TAY in psychiatric treatment has been well documented in the literature. According to the 2014 Substance Abuse and Mental Health Services Administration (SAMHSA) study report: one-fifth of young adults of age 18 to 25 had a mental health illness in the past year, yet two-thirds of those did not receive treatment. Youth with serious mental health conditions can have significant delays in their psychosocial development that can impair their ability to function as they enter adulthood.

==== Programs and changes in programs ====
Foster care is and was intended to be a temporary situation for children, however many children entering foster care, 25-30% (Kelly) remain there until the age of 18. According to the U.S. Census Bureau, in 2005, of the approximately 500,000 (was 550,000 in 2000) children in the foster care system in the United States, an estimated 24,000 foster youth age out of care each year and attempt to live independently. (Gardner)

Homelessness for youth aging out could be lessened using the Chafee Independent Living Program of 1999. According to this program states are allowed to use up to 30% of their independent living funds on room and board for former foster youth who are at least 18 years old but not yet 21. It also requires states to use at least some portion of their funds to provide follow-up services to foster youth after they age out. (Dworsky) The previous program, Title IV-E Independent Living Program of 1990, did not allow the state to use any of its funding for room and board, independent living subsidies, or transitional housing for youth aging out. (Dworsky)

The Fostering Connections to Success and Increasing Adoptions Act of 2008 contains several provisions aimed at promoting permanent family connections for youth in foster care. (Dworsky) The following are changes made by the Fostering Connections to Success and Increasing Adoptions Act of 2008 to improve the connection between foster youth and extended family members:

- Notice to Relatives When Children Enter Care. Increases opportunities for relatives to step in when children are removed from their parents and placed in foster care by ensuring they get notice of this removal.
- Kinship Navigator Programs. Guarantees funds for Kinship Navigator programs, through new Family Connection grants, to help connect children living with relatives, both in and out of foster care, with the supports and assistance they need.
- Subsidized Guardianship Payments for Relatives. Helps children in foster care leave care to live permanently with grandparents and other relative guardians when they cannot be returned home or adopted and offers federal support to states to assist with subsidized guardianship payments to families for these children, generally to age 18. In certain circumstances, children may continue to receive guardianship assistance to age 21. Clarifies that all children who, as of September 30, 2008, were receiving federally supported subsidized guardianship payments or services in states with Child Welfare Demonstration Waivers will be able to continue to receive that assistance and services under the new program. Clarifies that children who leave foster care after age 16 for kinship guardianship are eligible for independent living services and makes them eligible for education and training vouchers.
- Licensing Standards for Relatives. Clarifies that states may waive non-safety related licensing standards for relatives on a case-by-case basis and requires the Department of Health and Human Services (HHS) to report to Congress on the use of licensing waivers and recommendations for increasing the percentage of relative foster family homes that are licensed.
- New Family Connection Grants. Increases resources for Kinship Navigator programs, as described above. Also provides grants for Family Group Decision-making Meetings, Intensive Family Finding activities, and Residential Family-Based Substance Abuse Treatment, all of which can help children stay safely with family members and out of foster care or, once in care, return safely to their parents or find permanence with other relatives.
- Keeping Siblings Together. Preserves the sibling bond for children by requiring states to make reasonable efforts to place siblings together when they must be removed from their parents' home, provided it is in the children's best interests. In the case of siblings not placed together, states must make reasonable efforts to provide for frequent visitation or other ongoing interaction, unless such interaction would be harmful to any of the siblings. (Children's Defense Fund)

This Act helps youth who turn 18 in foster care without permanent families to remain in care, at state option, to age 19, 20, or 21 with continued federal support to increase their opportunities for success as they transition to adulthood. (Children's Defense Fund) This Act also assists foster youth with extra support surrounding their education and healthcare needs as the age out.

24,000 youth age out of foster care every year. The majority of them will be dependent on government assistance at some point whether it is for medical care because of the lack of insurance, food assistance because of the lack of income, housing assistance because of the lack of income, or in some cases their children will be in the foster care system perpetuating the foster care cycle. Society as a whole needs to recognize the consequences of foster youth aging out without the education, experience, knowledge, or skills needed to become a successful adult. Changes to the foster care system can be made, but it will take time, patience, endurance, persistence, and ingenuity from not only the workers in the system and the foster youth, but from a society that recognizes the impact foster youth aging out will make on the future.

==== Outcomes for transitional age youth in foster systems ====
Foster care youth are more likely to experience a lack of social support before they enter the system and are more likely to come from low income households with higher rates of physical and verbal abuse (Lindquist & Santavirts, 2014). Their experiences therefore shape their journey throughout the foster care system and into adulthood. When foster youth leave the system, they are more likely to face disadvantages and challenges when compared to their peers in the general population (Gypen et al., 2017).

Foster care youth are less likely to graduate from high school than their peers in the general population (Gypen et al., 2017). Those who are able to attain a high school diploma often find struggles when it comes to higher education. Foster care youth who enroll in college are twice as likely to drop out in their first year compared to their peers in the general population (Gypen et al., 2017). They are also less likely to complete 2-year degrees, and those who do make it to a 4-year university are more likely to drop out after 2 years (Gypen et al., 2017). This can then impact their ability to find employment as they are less likely to find stable employment once they exit the foster care system (Gypen et al., 2017). Although around 80% of former foster youth do find employment within 2 years of leaving the system, most of these jobs are part time and often require little skill or minimal pay (Dworsky, 2005). This then impacts their earnings, as they are more likely to earn less than non-foster care youth, and are more likely to live in poverty due to the low earnings (Gypen et al., 2017). When it comes to housing, the low earnings and lack of support then makes foster care youth more likely to experience unstable housing situations and, in some cases, homelessness. Around 28% of former foster care youth can secure their own place, while around .3% end up homeless, and most of the transitional youth end up in some sort of supported household (i.e. extended relative, foster parent, friend) (Gypen et al., 2017).

Mental health issues, substance abuse and alcohol abuse issues are also challenges that many transitional age youth face once they exit the foster care system. Foster care alumni are more likely to come from a past of neglect and/or physical/verbal abuse. Therefore, they are more likely to suffer from mental health issues such as disruptive disorders, depression, and PTSD (Gypen et al., 2017). Up to 63% of former foster care youth are likely to qualify for some sort of psychiatric disorder at some point in their lifetime (Gypen et al., 2017). In addition, foster care youth, particularly men, are more likely to suffer from substance abuse and mental health issues, and their chances of suffering from these issues increase as they get older (Gypen et al., 2017).

looking at the lack of experience foster youth have attained begins with the material sense, things such as driver's licenses, job experience, decision making and life skills. According to Heather Ann Woltman "They perceived transition-age youth as often lacking proficiency in decision-making and communication skills, job acquisition and money management skills, self-care skills, and tasks of daily living." (9) Emancipated youth must figure this out with limited support systems. When we look towards generational peers youth that have not been in the foster care system have extended support and education in these areas (Woltman 5) The lack of experience in essential life skills builds into the extreme stress levels and economic instability faced by emancipated youth. lack of experience in social functions increases difficulty to succeed at job interviews, while trying to communicate with medical professionals, and with simple daily life.

Many youths reported lack of experience in budgeting and money management. Lack of experience and knowledge in this area could heighten the risks of homelessness in the future as the risk of economic instability is already substantially higher than that of their generational peers. Amy Armstong-Heimsoth et al. explained that youth expressed need of support in finances "The need for financial services included skills to budget and save and utilize financial institutions. The need for an increase in allotted money was also expressed," They go on to explain "Youth encountered difficulty in accessing and participating in financial institutions as many needed willing co-signers." (Armstrong-Heimsoth et al. Sec. Observation objective 2) Issues related to financial difficulties were liable to exasperate other difficult odds faced by youth. Lack of education regarding money management was expressed, however this also pointed to other issues faced by emancipated youth, namely the lack of education.

Education is a part of the crucial foundation for adult life, yet many foster youth frequently encounter significant gaps in this vital area. According to the Texas education association "when compared to the general student population, students in foster care were more likely to be suspended or expelled, repeat a grade, or drop out. They also scored lower on statewide standardized tests and were less likely to graduate." (14) The issue of education in foster care extends beyond grades and diplomas, however these are the areas that tend to affect them the most in their adult lives. The job market and opportunities for young adults without a high school diploma or equivalent are limited and often insufficient. Looking at the detrimental nature of lacking education in adulthood calls into question the reasons surrounding this gap.

Permanency is a leading factor in the missing education for students in foster care. Throughout their time in care, youth often experience multiple moves, either from family to family or group facilities leading to a lack of connection and support within their education, as well as administrative miscommunications that result in loss of work and credits. Darren McGuire and the journal of childhood and adolescent trauma states; "children often enter placements of varying lengths or varying stability. Placement instability, generally defined as several changes in residency and/or caregiver for a child following entry into care, is a potential predictor of negative developmental outcomes" (Garcia et al., qtd. McGuire et al.,) This lack of permanency has been equated with both phycological and behavioral issues within foster youth that lead to poor outcomes in education. Poor behavior leads to increased suspensions, expulsions, and lack of support from teachers as children are written off as disruptive. With the trauma of foster care already being so heavy the added mental stressors of unstable placements can send youth over the edge.

Unfortunately, when foster youth reach the point of being burnt out their education takes the hit. According to Anthony bald and the journal of economic perspectives "among "emancipated" former foster youth in California, one in five previously dropped out of high school..." (Courtney et al qtd. Bald et al. 235) This lack of graduating students leads to poor economic outcomes, no matter the reason a student has left school it will put them at a disadvantage compared to their peers. With the competitive job markets that we live in, lack of diploma or GED will affect employment and possibly even wages feeding into both the issues of homelessness and economic instability, hindering the ability to return to school or achieve a diploma later.

Permanency and mental health both play significant roles in the outcomes of emancipated foster youth; both can be equated with support. Foster youth lack stable support within personal and academic lives. Jenefer E. Blakeslee expounds on this by stating "The social contexts that might typically support overall health and wellness—stable family-based networks, connections to schools and recreation, relationships with prosocial peers—are potentially disrupted or inhibited by the circumstances that lead to child welfare system involvement,"(1) Social support for foster youth is scarce even while they are in the system, after emancipation becomes even slimer. This can be heightened by the lack of permanency often experienced by foster youth. It has been noted that foster youth do have supportive people in their lives (Cancel et al. 65) however the foster system can affect these relationships as a general distrust of the system leads to youth breaking off or keeping these relationships secret. Foster youth also build a level of distrust and lack of personal relationships with social workers, policy administrators, and those who run or aid in transition services, this has been attributed to the lack of trust or genuineness that youth feel towards paid relationships in their lives.

While policies and programs aim to meet base level needs the mental-emotional wellbeing is often neglected, lack of support in this area leads to a variety of issues. Youth often feel alone, overwhelmed, and stressed. On top of this youth have many traumatic experiences to work past, which can be a long and complicated process that inhibits typical function. Without a support system in place, youth often turn to substance abuse to dull the pain, and to remove the feelings of fear that they constantly carry with them. According to the National Institute on Drug Abuse "Studies show traumatic, extremely stressful experiences like abuse, violence, neglect, or the death of a loved one make a person more vulnerable to developing a substance use disorder. Someone who has been through trauma or has experienced chronic stress might use substances like drugs and alcohol as a form of self-medication. They may use substances to temporarily cope with the distress they feel or with symptoms of related mental illnesses like post-traumatic stress disorder (PTSD)." (Sec. 3) The severe mental trauma that can come with foster care leaves a burden on foster youth that without support can overwhelm and consume them. This can and often does lead to substance abuse which affects other areas of their adult lives pushing them further into risk of homelessness and economic instability.

When looking at other common traits of emancipated youth, lack of supportive healthy relationships put a stain on successful transition. Emancipated youth are more likely to end up in abusive relationships, as teen, and or, single parents, or in unsafe situations. (Font et al. par.3) according to Colleen Cary Katz "Youth who have witnessed parental IPV are significantly more likely than their counterparts to engage in IPV perpetration and victimization in adolescence and young adulthood. (Kinsfogel & Grych, 2004; O'Donnell et al., 2006; O'Keefe, 1997; C. A. Thornberry, Henry, & Ireland, 2015; Thornberry, Henry, & Ireland, 2015; O'Donnell et al., 2006 qtd. Katz 4) This points to an unfortunate reality of foster care and that is the continuous cycle in which it often occurs. Emancipated youth are more likely to be teen parents, experience partner violence, as well as face issues with poverty and substance abuse, sadly this cumulation could lead to their children ending up in the foster care system.

== See also ==
- Child development
- Coming of Age
- Adolescence
- Erikson's Stages of pychosocial development
